= Rogne =

Rogne may refer to:

== People ==
- Thomas Rogne (born 1990), a Norwegian professional footballer who plays for Swedish club Helsingborgs IF

== Places ==
- Rogne, Gran, a village area in Gran Municipality in Innlandet county, Norway
- Rogne, Innlandet, a village in Øystre Slidre Municipality in Innlandet county, Norway
- Rogne Church, a church in the village of Rogne in Øystre Slidre Municipality in Innlandet county, Norway
