= Hegge =

Hegge may refer to:

== People ==
- Inger Lise Hegge (born 1965), Norwegian cross-country skier
- Olav Jørgen Hegge (died 2005), Norwegian fiddler and dancer
- Ole Hegge (1898–1994), Norwegian cross-country skier
- Per Egil Hegge (1940–2023), Norwegian journalist
- Robert Hegge (1599–1629), English academic and antiquary

== Places ==
- Hegge, India, a village in Uttara Kannada district, Karnataka, India
- Hegge, Innlandet, a village in Øystre Slidre municipality in Innlandet county, Norway
  - Hegge Stave Church, a church in Øystre Slidre municipality in Innlandet county, Norway
- Hegge, Limburg, a village in Limburg, Netherlands
- Hegge, Netherlands, a village in Epe municipality, Gelderland, Netherlands

== Other ==
- Hegge cycle, a cycle of 42 medieval mystery plays
