= Beitostølen =

Village in Øystre Slidre Municipality, Norway

Beitostølen Beitostøl
- Village
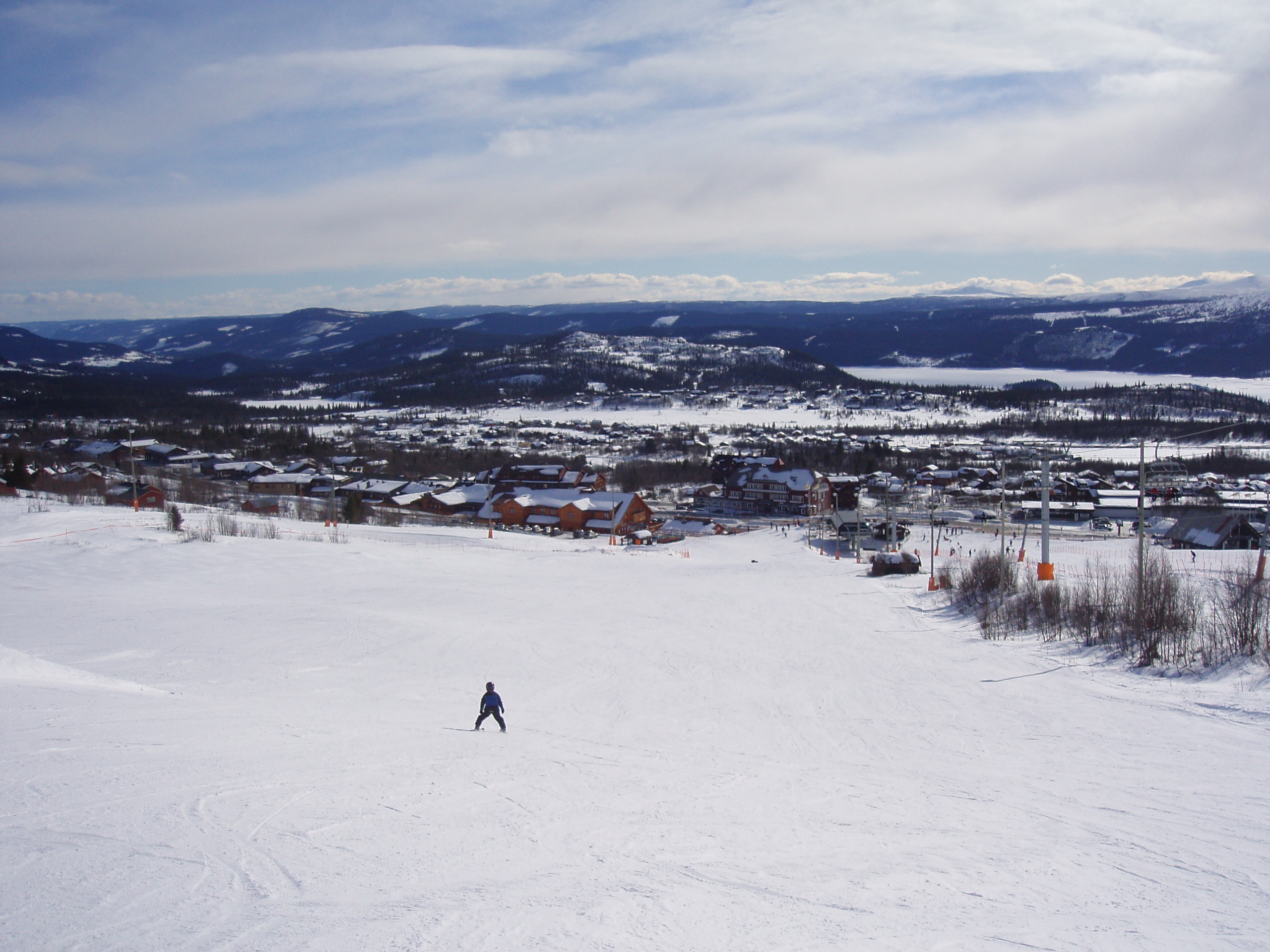
- View of the village
- Interactive map of Beitostølen
- Location within Innlandet Location within Norway
- Coordinates: 61.24865°N 8.90621°E
- Country: Norway
- Region: Eastern Norway
- County: Innlandet
- District: Valdres
- Municipality: Øystre Slidre Municipality

Area
  - Total: 1.08 km^{2} (0.42 sq mi)
- Elevation: 893 m (2,930 ft)

Population (2024)
  - Total: 342
  - Density: 317/km^{2} (820/sq mi)
- Time zone: UTC+01:00 (CET)
  - Summer (DST): UTC+02:00 (CEST)
- Post Code: 2953 Beitostølen

Beitostølen is a village in Øystre Slidre Municipality in Innlandet county, Norway. The village is located at an elevation of about 900 metres (3,000 ft) above mean sea level on the southern edge of the Valdresflye mountain plateau. The villages of Skammestein and Hegge lie about 10 kilometres (6.2 mi) to the southeast of Beitostølen. The lake Øyangen lies a short distance to the southwest of the village. The Norwegian County Road 51 runs through the village.

The 1.08-square-kilometre (270-acre) village has a population (2024) of 342 and a population density of 317 inhabitants per square kilometre (820/sq mi).

== Etymology ==
The name Beitostølen comes from "Beito" and "stølen". "Beito" is a common name that appears multiple places in Norway, but the origin of the word is unknown. It could be a name or an Old Norse description of a place. Stølen is a common Norwegian word meaning mountain farm or seter.

== Sports ==
Beitostølen is largely a tourist area, with many holiday cabins and hotels serving various winter sports facilities. The village has hosted FIS Cross-Country World Cup and Biathlon World Cup competitions. Beitostølen is a year-round destination, and although the mountain village is best known to many as a winter sports destination due to its local alpine ski slopes, it also has cross-country skiing trails totaling 320 kilometres (200 mi). July is the month with the highest tourism rate due to hiking in the nearby Jotunheimen National Park to the north.
