= Lidar Church =

Church in Innlandet, Norway

- Lidar kyrkje
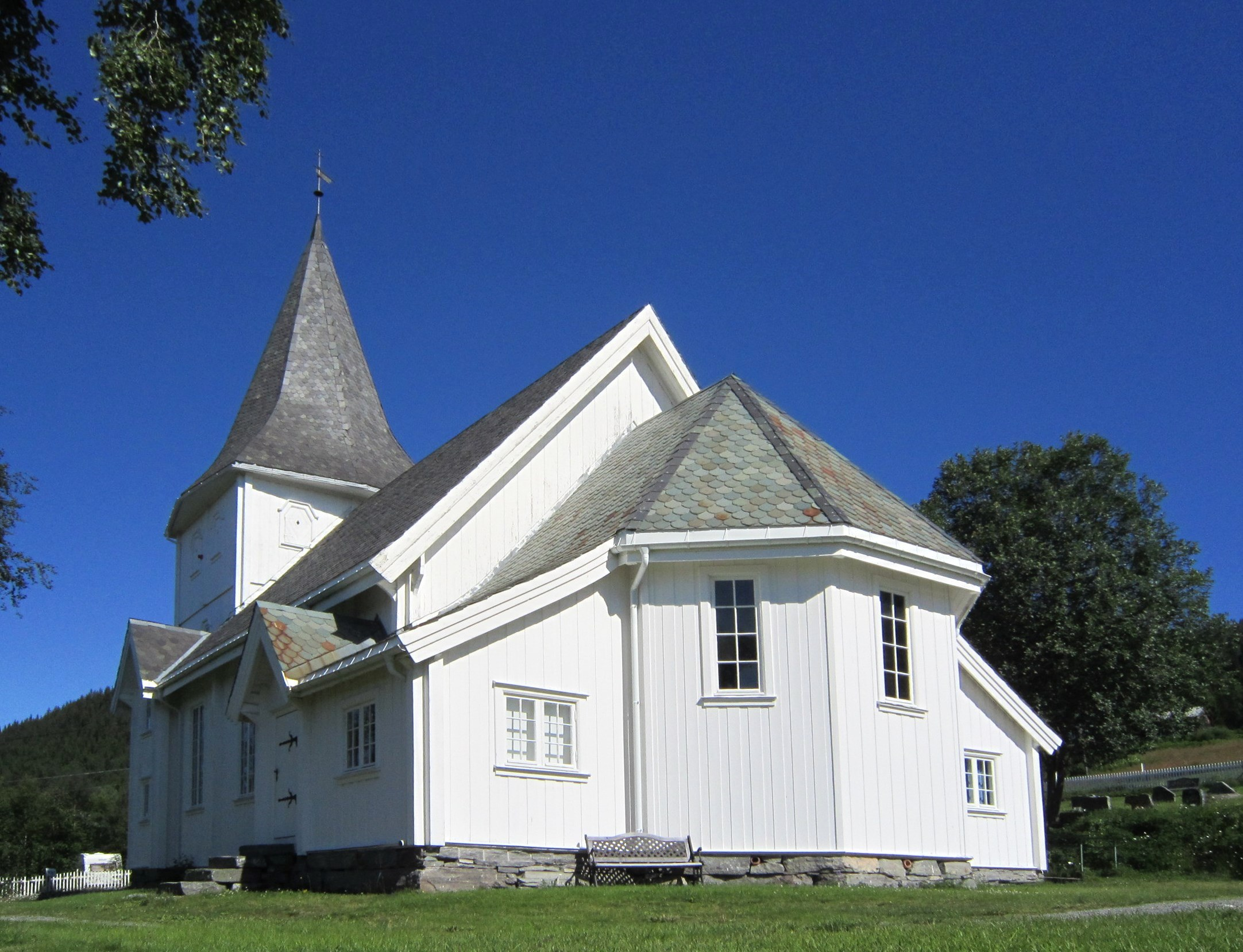
- View of the church Credit: Jan-Tore Egge
- Lidar Church
- 61°12′04″N 8°58′47″E
- Location: Øystre Slidre, Innlandet
- Country: Norway
- Denomination: Church of Norway
- Churchmanship: Evangelical Lutheran

History
- Status: Parish church
- Founded: 1932
- Consecrated: 1932

Architecture
- Functional status: Active
- Architect: Ole Stein
- Architectural type: Long church
- Completed: 1932 (94 years ago)

Specifications
- Capacity: 200
- Materials: Wood

Administration
- Diocese: Hamar bispedømme
- Deanery: Valdres prosti
- Parish: Lidar
- Norwegian Cultural Heritage Site
- Type: Church
- Status: Protected
- ID: 84300

Lidar Church (Norwegian: Lidar kyrkje) is a parish church of the Church of Norway in Øystre Slidre Municipality in Innlandet county, Norway. It is located in the village of Skammestein. It is the church for the Lidar parish which is part of the Valdres prosti (deanery) in the Diocese of Hamar. The white, wooden church was built in a long church design in 1932 using plans drawn up by the architect Ole Stein. The church seats about 200 people.

== History ==
There was an old wooden stave church at Lidar during the Middle Ages. It was likely located about 50 metres (160 ft) to the southeast of the present church. The old stave church was closed and torn down around 1665. Some of the old materials from the church were reused elsewhere including in making a gate at the nearby Hegge Stave Church. In the 1880s, work began on a new burial ground in Skammestein. In 1900, some money was allocated for the new cemetery and a plot of land was purchased. The cemetery was consecrated in the fall of 1902. Not long afterwards, people in the area began pushing for an annex chapel to be built at the cemetery site. In 1919, the parish council approved the plan. The building was designed by architect Ole Stein and the lead builder was Halldor G. Skattebu. Construction of the new chapel took place in 1932. Lidar Chapel was consecrated on 2 December 1932. Originally, the building was brown-colored. In 1956, the exterior was painted white. On 1 October 1996, the chapel was upgraded to the status of a parish church and it has been titled as Lidar Church since that date.

== See also ==
- List of churches in Hamar
