= Øyangen (Valdres) =

Lake in Innlandet, Norway

- Interactive map of the lake
- Location: Innlandet, Norway
- Coordinates: 61.21462°N 8.88304°E
- Basin countries: Norway
- Max. length: 5 kilometres (3.1 mi)
- Max. width: 1.7 kilometres (1.1 mi)
- Surface area: 6.644 km^{2} (2.565 sq mi)
- Max. depth: 73 metres (240 ft)
- Shore length^{1}: 18.46 kilometres (11.47 mi)
- Surface elevation: 677 metres (2,221 ft)
- References: NVE
- ^{1} Shore length is not a well-defined measure.

Øyangen is a lake in Innlandet county, Norway. The 6.644-square-kilometre (2.565 sq mi) lake lies on the border of Øystre Slidre Municipality, Vestre Slidre Municipality, and Vang Municipality. The lake lies about 5 kilometres (3.1 mi) to the south of the village of Beitostølen and about 5 kilometres (3.1 mi) to the northwest of the village of Skammestein. The lake is regulated for hydroelectric power generation. It serves as a reservoir for the nearby Lomen power plant.

== See also ==
- List of lakes in Norway
