= Øystre Slidre Municipality =

Municipality in Innlandet, Norway

Øystre Slidre Municipality Øystre Slidre kommune
- Municipality
- Østre Slidre herred (historic name)
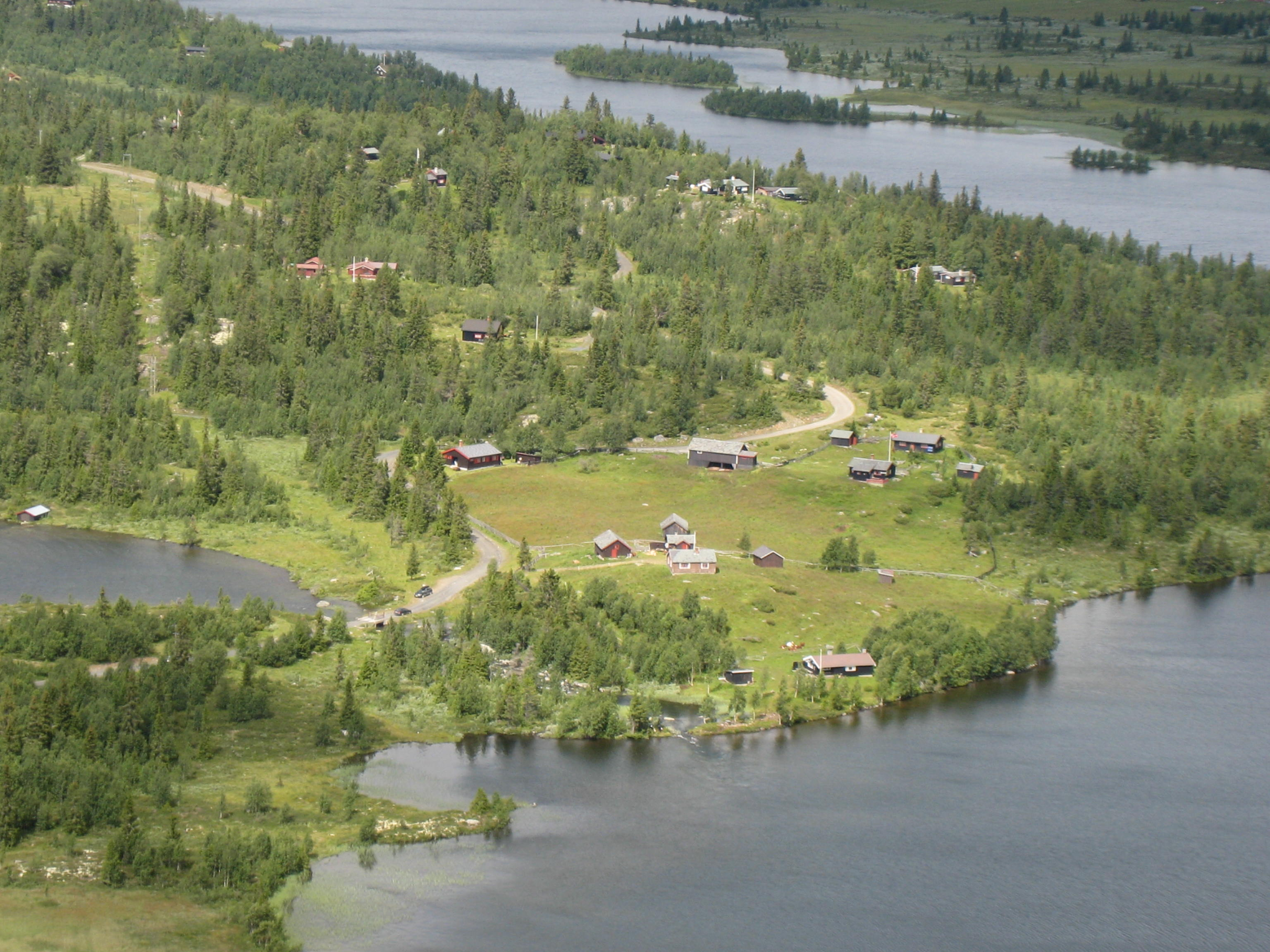
- Buahaugen in Øystre Slidre

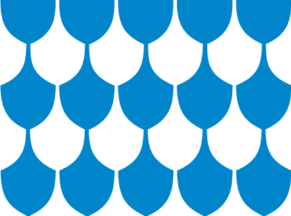
- Flag Coat of arms

- Innlandet within Norway

- Øystre Slidre within Innlandet
- Coordinates: 61°14′11″N 9°8′37″E
- Country: Norway
- County: Innlandet
- District: Valdres
- Established: 1849
  - Preceded by: Slidre Municipality
- Administrative centre: Heggenes

Government
  - Mayor (2023): Bjarne Budal (Ap)

Area
  - Total: 969.89 km^{2} (374.48 sq mi)
  - Land: 886.08 km^{2} (342.12 sq mi)
  - Water: 83.81 km^{2} (32.36 sq mi) 8.6%
  - Rank: #120 in Norway
- Highest elevation: 2,010.66 m (6,596.7 ft)

Population (2025)
  - Total: 3,311
  - Rank: #221 in Norway
  - Density: 3.4/km^{2} (8.8/sq mi)
  - Change (10 years): ▲ +2.9%
- Demonym: Øystreslidring

Official language
  - Norwegian form: Nynorsk
- Time zone: UTC+01:00 (CET)
  - Summer (DST): UTC+02:00 (CEST)
- ISO 3166 code: NO-3453
- Website: Official website

Øystre Slidre is a municipality in Innlandet county, Norway. It is located in the traditional district of Valdres. The administrative centre of the municipality is the village of Heggenes. Other villages in the municipality include Hegge, Rogne, Volbu, Moane, Skammestein, Beito, and Beitostølen.

The 969.89-square-kilometre (374.48 sq mi) municipality is the 120th largest by area out of the 357 municipalities in Norway. Øystre Slidre Municipality is the 221st most populous municipality in Norway with a population of 3,311. The municipality's population density is 3.4 inhabitants per square kilometre (8.8/sq mi) and its population has increased by 2.9% over the previous 10-year period.

== General information ==
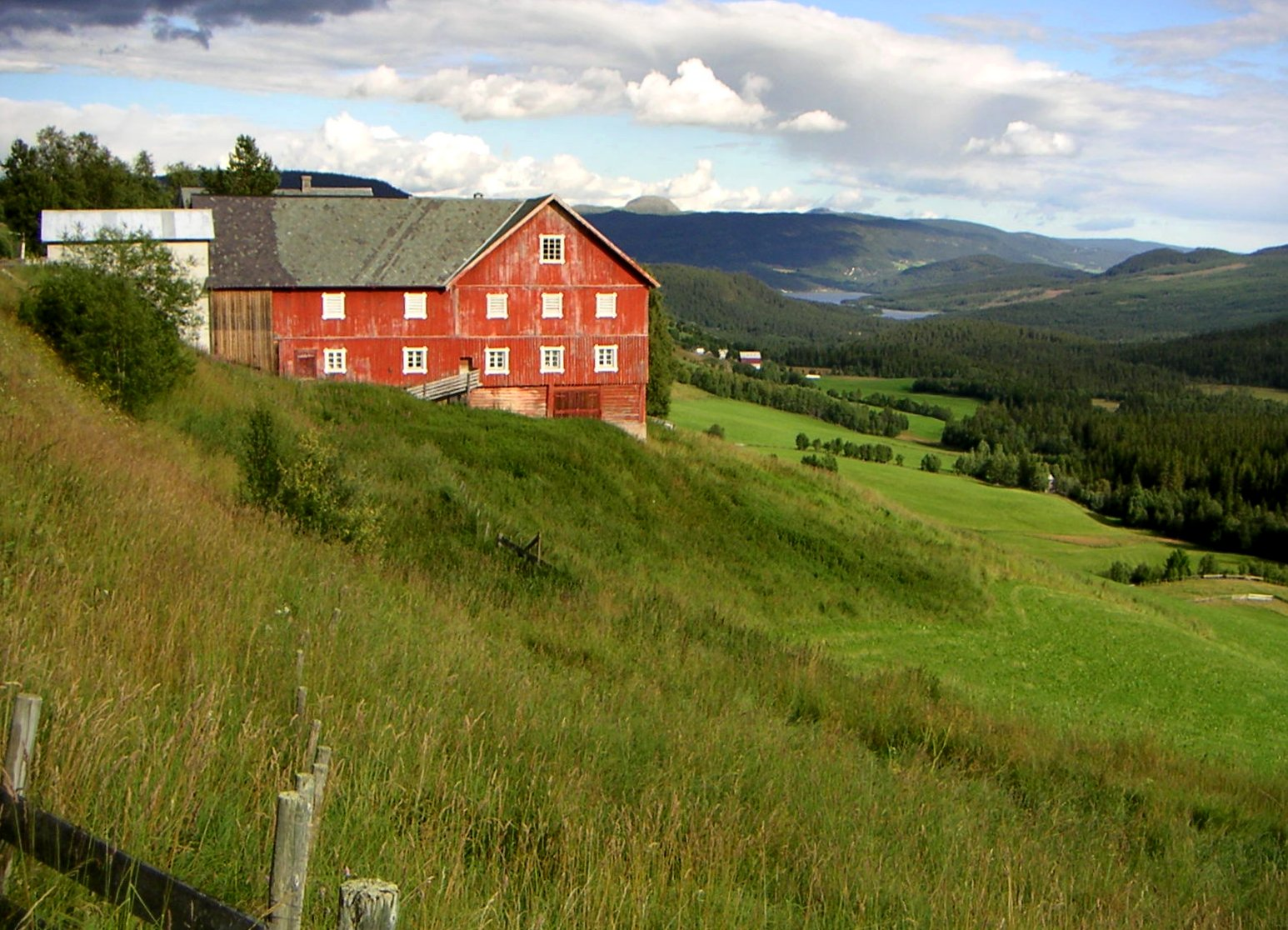
At Røyne, looking towards Hegge

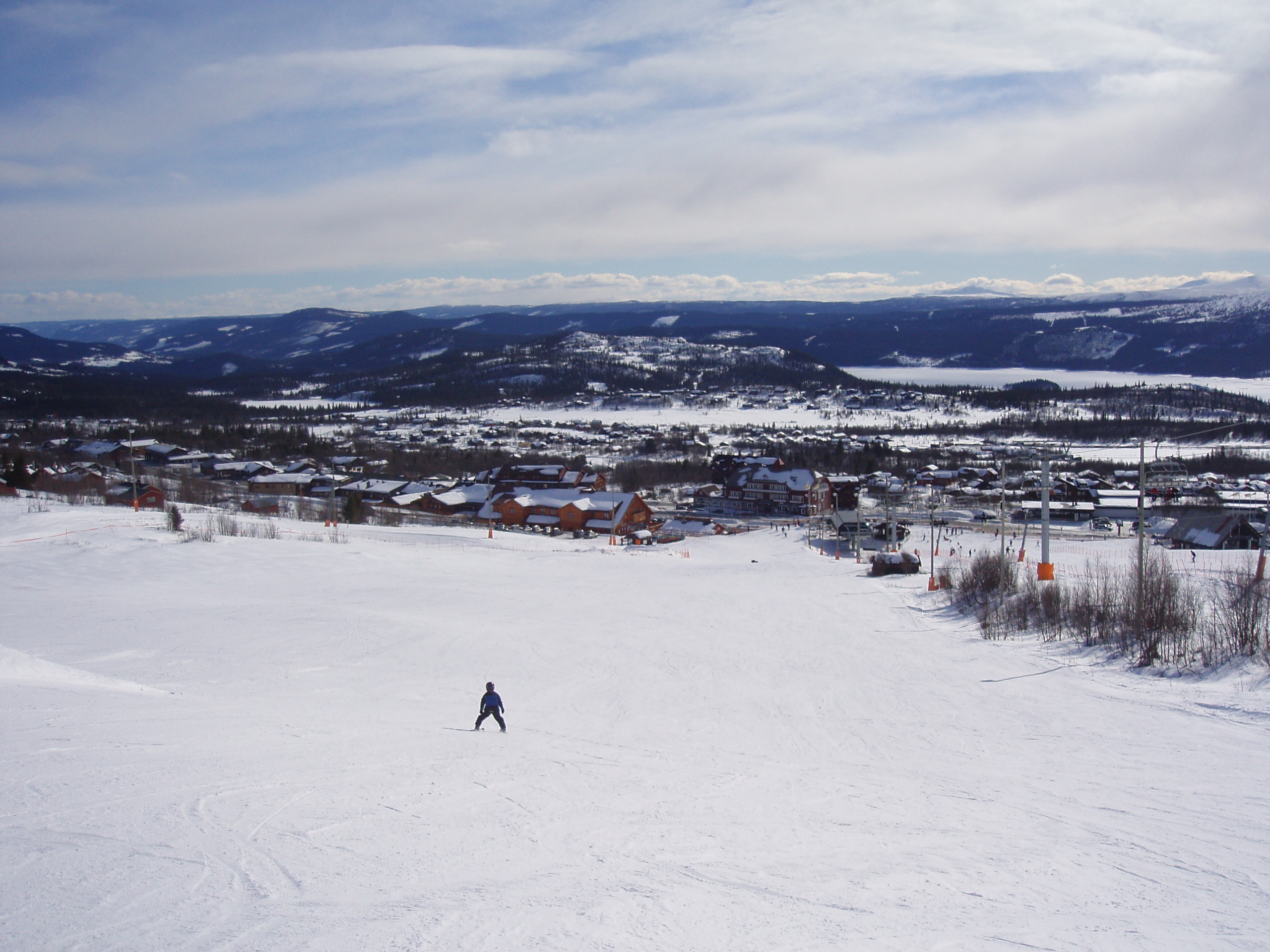
Beitostølen, view towards town centre

The municipality of Østre Slidre, later spelled Øystre Slidre, was established in 1849, when the former Slidre Municipality, created in 1838, was divided into Østre Slidre Municipality, with a population of 2,406, and Vestre Slidre Municipality, with a population of 3,130. On 1 January 1882, a small area of Vang Municipality, with 31 residents, was transferred to the neighbouring Østre Slidre Municipality. On 1 January 1899, a small uninhabited area of Østre Slidre Municipality was transferred to Vestre Slidre Municipality.

Historically, the municipality was part of the former Oppland county. On 1 January 2020, Øystre Slidre became part of the newly created Innlandet county, formed through the merger of Hedmark and Oppland.

On 1 January 2021, the Skjelgrenda area of Vestre Slidre Municipality was transferred to Øystre Slidre Municipality.

=== Name ===
The municipality, originally the parish, is named after the old Slidre farm, recorded in Old Norse as Slíðrar, because the old Slidredomen church was built there. The name is probably derived from slíðr, meaning "sheath", possibly referring to a long depression near the church. When the municipality and parish were divided in 1849, the word østre, meaning "eastern", was added to the name. The meaning of Østre Slidre is therefore "the eastern part of Slidre". The municipality was historically spelled Østre Slidre. On 11 September 1925, a royal resolution changed the official spelling to Øystre Slidre, using a local dialect form of the same word.

=== Coat of arms ===
The coat of arms was granted on 17 March 1989. The official blazon is "Plumetty azure and argent" (Norwegian: Dekt av blå og sølv skjell). This means that the arms have a field, or background, covered with a plumetty pattern in alternating blue and argent tinctures. Argent is usually shown as white, or as silver when metal is used.

The design is intended to resemble tiles made of slate. It refers to the slate industry, which was formerly important in the area, and to the use of slate roofing in Valdres. The arms were designed by Odd Karlberg. The municipal flag has the same design as the coat of arms.

=== Churches ===
The Church of Norway has four parishes, or sokn, within Øystre Slidre Municipality. They are part of the Valdres prosti, or deanery, in the Diocese of Hamar.

Churches in Øystre Slidre Municipality
Parish (sokn)	Church name	Location of the church	Year built
Hegge	Hegge Stave Church	Hegge	1216
Lidar	Lidar Church	Skammestein	1932
Rogne	Rogne Church	Rogne	1857
Volbu	Volbu Church	Volbu	1820

== History ==
Båtskaret (lit. 'The boat pass') is a narrow pass along the mountain Bitihorn where in medieval times people from the Øystre Slidre area dragged their boats through, therefore the name. A bit further into the mountain there is a big lake called Vinstre with a lot of fine trout. As a result of a dispute between people from Valdres and people from Gudbrandsdalen, they could not leave their boats behind. Therefore, they had to resort to dragging their boats through Båtskaret. According to local folklore, the dispute began in medieval times with a young bride being married to an old man and a knight stealing his way over the mountains to rescue her.

Hegge Stave Church was originally constructed around the year 1216 in the village of Hegge. It has been extensively rebuilt and is mostly post-reformation. It contains a fine altarpiece (reredos) carved by Eistein Kjørn from Heidal between 1781 and 1782.

== Geography ==
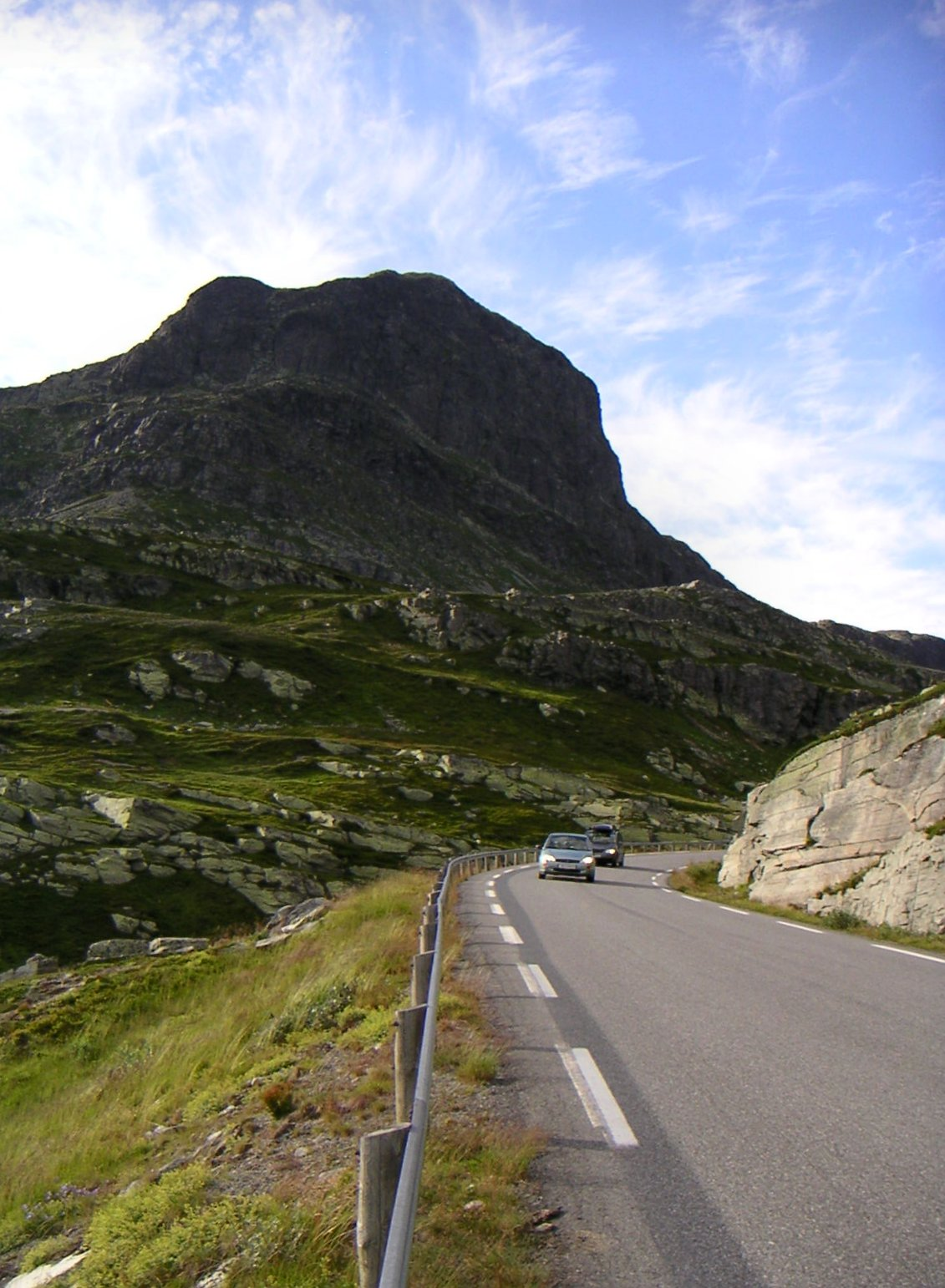
Bitihorn and Båtskaret (the boat pass)

Øystre Slidre Municipality shares borders with Nord-Aurdal Municipality and Vestre Slidre Municipality in the south; Vang Municipality in the west; Gausdal Municipality, Sør-Fron Municipality, and Nord-Fron Municipality to the east; and up to the Valdresflya plateau at the border of Vågå Municipality in the north. Øystre Slidre Municipality is part of the traditional district of Valdres in central, southern Norway, situated between the Gudbrandsdal and Hallingdal valleys. Øystre Slidre Municipality measures about 45.1 kilometres (28.0 mi) on a north–south axis and 39.8 kilometres (24.7 mi) on an east–west axis.

The highest point in the municipality is the 2,010.66-metre (6,596.7 ft) tall mountain Øystre Rasletinden, located as a tri-point on the border with Vågå Municipality, Vang Municipality, and Øystre Slidre Municipality. About 73% of the land is over 900 metres (3,000 ft) in elevation. More than 10% of the land is over 1,300 metres (4,300 ft) above sea level. Some of the notable mountains in the municipality include Gråhøe, Store Kalvemellen, Kvernhøe, Rabalsmellen, Raslet, Rundemellen, Skaget, and Skarvemellen. The lowest points lie at 410 metres (1,350 ft) above sea level. Lakes and rivers cover 75 square kilometres (29 sq mi) of the area. The largest lakes are Vinstre, Yddin, Vangsjøen, Javnin, Olevatn, Nedre Heimdalsvatn, Øyangen, and Sandvatnet/Kaldfjorden/Øyvatnet.

== Climate ==
Climate data for Løken i Volbu 1991-2020 (521 m)
Month	Jan	Feb	Mar	Apr	May	Jun	Jul	Aug	Sep	Oct	Nov	Dec	Year
Mean daily maximum °C (°F)	−3.3 (26.1)	−1.8 (28.8)	2.9 (37.2)	7.5 (45.5)	12.6 (54.7)	17.1 (62.8)	19.7 (67.5)	17.9 (64.2)	13.4 (56.1)	6.2 (43.2)	0.6 (33.1)	−3.2 (26.2)	7.5 (45.5)
Daily mean °C (°F)	−7.2 (19.0)	−6.3 (20.7)	−2.3 (27.9)	2.5 (36.5)	7.3 (45.1)	11.8 (53.2)	14.4 (57.9)	12.8 (55.0)	8.6 (47.5)	2.6 (36.7)	−2.7 (27.1)	−6.8 (19.8)	2.9 (37.2)
Average precipitation mm (inches)	46 (1.8)	30 (1.2)	34 (1.3)	31 (1.2)	48 (1.9)	72 (2.8)	82 (3.2)	86 (3.4)	55 (2.2)	57 (2.2)	52 (2.0)	39 (1.5)	632 (24.7)
Source 1: Yr (precipitation)
Source 2: NOAA - WMO averages 91-2020 Norway

== Government ==
Øystre Slidre Municipality is responsible for primary education (through 10th grade), outpatient health services, senior citizen services, welfare and other social services, zoning, economic development, and municipal roads and utilities. The municipality is governed by a municipal council of directly elected representatives. The mayor is indirectly elected by a vote of the municipal council. The municipality is under the jurisdiction of the Vestoppland og Valdres District Court and the Eidsivating Court of Appeal.

=== Municipal council ===
The municipal council (Kommunestyre) of Øystre Slidre Municipality is made up of 21 representatives that are elected to four year terms. The tables below show the current and historical composition of the council by political party.

Øystre Slidre kommunestyre 2023–2027
Party name (in Nynorsk)	Number of representatives
Labour Party (Arbeidarpartiet)	6
Conservative Party (Høgre)	4
Centre Party (Senterpartiet)	6
Socialist Left Party (Sosialistisk Venstreparti)	3
Liberal Party (Venstre)	2
Total number of members:	21

Øystre Slidre kommunestyre 2019–2023
Party name (in Nynorsk)	Number of representatives
Labour Party (Arbeidarpartiet)	5
Conservative Party (Høgre)	3
Centre Party (Senterpartiet)	11
Socialist Left Party (Sosialistisk Venstreparti)	1
Liberal Party (Venstre)	1
Total number of members:	21

Øystre Slidre kommunestyre 2015–2019
Party name (in Nynorsk)	Number of representatives
Labour Party (Arbeidarpartiet)	10
Progress Party (Framstegspartiet)	1
Conservative Party (Høgre)	3
Centre Party (Senterpartiet)	6
Liberal Party (Venstre)	1
Total number of members:	21

Øystre Slidre kommunestyre 2011–2015
Party name (in Nynorsk)	Number of representatives
Labour Party (Arbeidarpartiet)	9
Progress Party (Framstegspartiet)	2
Conservative Party (Høgre)	5
Centre Party (Senterpartiet)	5
Total number of members:	21

Øystre Slidre kommunestyre 2007–2011
Party name (in Nynorsk)	Number of representatives
Labour Party (Arbeidarpartiet)	9
Progress Party (Framstegspartiet)	2
Conservative Party (Høgre)	1
Centre Party (Senterpartiet)	7
Liberal Party (Venstre)	2
Total number of members:	21

Øystre Slidre kommunestyre 2003–2007
Party name (in Nynorsk)	Number of representatives
Labour Party (Arbeidarpartiet)	8
Progress Party (Framstegspartiet)	2
Conservative Party (Høgre)	1
Christian Democratic Party (Kristeleg Folkeparti)	1
Centre Party (Senterpartiet)	6
Liberal Party (Venstre)	3
Total number of members:	21

Øystre Slidre kommunestyre 1999–2003
Party name (in Nynorsk)	Number of representatives
Labour Party (Arbeidarpartiet)	9
Conservative Party (Høgre)	2
Christian Democratic Party (Kristeleg Folkeparti)	1
Centre Party (Senterpartiet)	6
Liberal Party (Venstre)	3
Total number of members:	21

Øystre Slidre kommunestyre 1995–1999
Party name (in Nynorsk)	Number of representatives
Labour Party (Arbeidarpartiet)	5
Conservative Party (Høgre)	2
Centre Party (Senterpartiet)	10
Socialist Left Party (Sosialistisk Venstreparti)	1
Liberal Party (Venstre)	3
Total number of members:	21

Øystre Slidre kommunestyre 1991–1995
Party name (in Nynorsk)	Number of representatives
Labour Party (Arbeidarpartiet)	6
Progress Party (Framstegspartiet)	1
Conservative Party (Høgre)	1
Centre Party (Senterpartiet)	10
Socialist Left Party (Sosialistisk Venstreparti)	2
Liberal Party (Venstre)	1
Total number of members:	21

Øystre Slidre kommunestyre 1987–1991
Party name (in Nynorsk)	Number of representatives
Labour Party (Arbeidarpartiet)	9
Conservative Party (Høgre)	3
Christian Democratic Party (Kristeleg Folkeparti)	1
Centre Party (Senterpartiet)	5
Socialist Left Party (Sosialistisk Venstreparti)	1
Liberal Party (Venstre)	2
Total number of members:	21

Øystre Slidre kommunestyre 1983–1987
Party name (in Nynorsk)	Number of representatives
Labour Party (Arbeidarpartiet)	8
Conservative Party (Høgre)	3
Christian Democratic Party (Kristeleg Folkeparti)	1
Centre Party (Senterpartiet)	6
Liberal Party (Venstre)	3
Total number of members:	21

Øystre Slidre kommunestyre 1979–1983
Party name (in Nynorsk)	Number of representatives
Labour Party (Arbeidarpartiet)	7
Conservative Party (Høgre)	4
Christian Democratic Party (Kristeleg Folkeparti)	1
Centre Party (Senterpartiet)	6
Liberal Party (Venstre)	3
Total number of members:	21

Øystre Slidre kommunestyre 1975–1979
Party name (in Nynorsk)	Number of representatives
Labour Party (Arbeidarpartiet)	8
Centre Party (Senterpartiet)	8
Liberal Party (Venstre)	5
Total number of members:	21

Øystre Slidre kommunestyre 1971–1975
Party name (in Nynorsk)	Number of representatives
Labour Party (Arbeidarpartiet)	10
Joint List(s) of Non-Socialist Parties (Borgarlege Felleslister)	11
Total number of members:	21

Øystre Slidre kommunestyre 1967–1971
Party name (in Nynorsk)	Number of representatives
Labour Party (Arbeidarpartiet)	8
Conservative Party (Høgre)	1
Centre Party (Senterpartiet)	8
Liberal Party (Venstre)	4
Total number of members:	21

Øystre Slidre kommunestyre 1963–1967
Party name (in Nynorsk)	Number of representatives
Labour Party (Arbeidarpartiet)	9
Centre Party (Senterpartiet)	8
Liberal Party (Venstre)	4
Total number of members:	21

Øystre Slidre heradsstyre 1959–1963
Party name (in Nynorsk)	Number of representatives
Labour Party (Arbeidarpartiet)	8
Conservative Party (Høgre)	1
Joint List(s) of Non-Socialist Parties (Borgarlege Felleslister)	12
Total number of members:	21

Øystre Slidre heradsstyre 1955–1959
Party name (in Nynorsk)	Number of representatives
Labour Party (Arbeidarpartiet)	8
Farmers' Party (Bondepartiet)	8
Liberal Party (Venstre)	5
Total number of members:	21

Øystre Slidre heradsstyre 1951–1955
Party name (in Nynorsk)	Number of representatives
Labour Party (Arbeidarpartiet)	7
Farmers' Party (Bondepartiet)	6
Liberal Party (Venstre)	7
Total number of members:	20

Øystre Slidre heradsstyre 1947–1951
Party name (in Nynorsk)	Number of representatives
Labour Party (Arbeidarpartiet)	6
Farmers' Party (Bondepartiet)	2
Joint list of the Liberal Party (Venstre) and the Radical People's Party (Radikale Folkepartiet)	2
Joint List(s) of Non-Socialist Parties (Borgarlege Felleslister)	10
Total number of members:	20

Øystre Slidre heradsstyre 1945–1947
Party name (in Nynorsk)	Number of representatives
Labour Party (Arbeidarpartiet)	7
Farmers' Party (Bondepartiet)	3
Joint list of the Liberal Party (Venstre) and the Radical People's Party (Radikale Folkepartiet)	7
Joint List(s) of Non-Socialist Parties (Borgarlege Felleslister)	3
Total number of members:	20

Øystre Slidre heradsstyre 1937–1941*
Party name (in Nynorsk)	Number of representatives
Labour Party (Arbeidarpartiet)	5
Farmers' Party (Bondepartiet)	7
Joint list of the Liberal Party (Venstre) and the Radical People's Party (Radikale Folkepartiet)	8
Total number of members:	20
Note: Due to the German occupation of Norway during World War II, no elections were held for new municipal councils until after the war ended in 1945.

=== Mayors ===
The mayor (Nynorsk: ordførar) of Øystre Slidre Municipality is the political leader of the municipality and the chairperson of the municipal council. Here is a list of people who have held this position:

- 1849–1853: Tøllev Løken
- 1854–1855: Endre Rogne
- 1871–1875: Ole R. Skattebo
- 1875–1887: Tollef Knudsen Liekren
- 1888–1891: Knud O. Rogne
- 1892–1904: Torstein Rogne
- 1905–1910: G.H. Skattebo
- 1911–1916: Ole Bustebakke (V)
- 1917–1925: Knut O. Alfstad (V)
- 1925–1931: Knut Ekkern (FV)
- 1931–1941: Gullik K. Hovi (RF)
- 1941–1945: John O. Mørstad (NS)
- 1945–1947: Gullik K. Hovi (V)
- 1948–1955: Haldor Hegge (V)
- 1956–1959: Knut Bjørnstad (Sp)
- 1960–1963: Haldor Hegge (V)
- 1964–1975: Knut Bjørnstad (Sp)
- 1976–1979: Nils T. Windingstad (Sp)
- 1980–1991: Knut Bergo (V)
- 1992–1997: Terje Stenseng (Sp)
- 1997–1999: Ola Fjelltun (Sp)
- 1999–2003: Ove Skaret (Ap)
- 2003–2011: Gro Lundby (Ap)
- 2011–2019: Kjell Berge Melbybråten (Ap)
- 2019–2023: Odd Erik Holden (Sp)
- 2023–present: Bjarne Budal (Ap)

== Economy ==
Number of minorities (1st and 2nd generation) in Øystre Slidre by country of origin in 2017
Ancestry	Number
Lithuania	49
Poland	47
Syria	39

Because of the rugged landscape, farming is only possible on a small scale, but this is still one of the main sources of income. There are only about 30 square kilometres (12 mi^{2}) of agricultural land in the municipality. About 85% of farmers in the municipality use the high mountain pastures in the summer time.

The winter sports resort of Beitostølen, host to World Cup events in biathlon and cross-country skiing, is located here. It is the biggest tourist area in the municipality, and provides a large fraction of the municipality's income.

== Notable people ==
- Olav Beito (1901–1989), a linguist and academic
- Ole Haldorsen Bjelbøle (1879–??), a farmer and politician
- Torger Hovi (1905–1980), a politician and deputy mayor of Øystre Slidre from 1959–1961
- Torleiv Bolstad (1915–1979), a musician and Hardanger fiddle player
