= Skarvemellen =

Mountain in Innlandet, Norway

- Skarvemellin
- Interactive map of the mountain

Highest point
- Elevation: 1,267 m (4,157 ft)
- Prominence: 213 m (699 ft)
- Parent peak: Rundemellen
- Isolation: 2.2 km (1.4 mi)
- Coordinates: 61°05′15″N 9°14′53″E

Geography
- Location: Innlandet, Norway

Skarvemellen is a mountain in Øystre Slidre Municipality in Innlandet county, Norway. The 1,267-metre (4,157 ft) tall mountain is located about 6 kilometres (3.7 mi) east of the village of Rogne. The mountain is surrounded by several other notable mountains including Rundemellen and Rabalsmellen to the north and Store Kalvemellen to the northeast.

== See also ==
- List of mountains of Norway by height
