= Volbu Church =

Church in Innlandet, Norway

- Volbu kyrkje
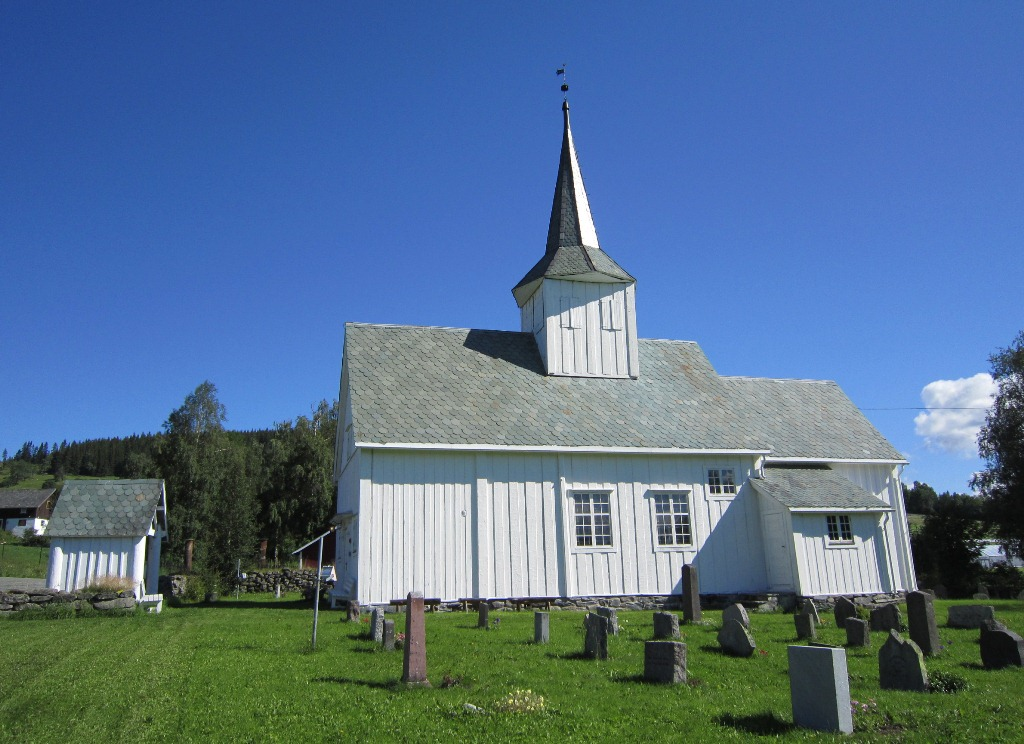
- View of the church Credit: Jan-Tore Egge
- Volbu Church
- 61°07′14″N 9°03′32″E
- Location: Øystre Slidre, Innlandet
- Country: Norway
- Denomination: Church of Norway
- Previous denomination: Catholic Church
- Churchmanship: Evangelical Lutheran

History
- Status: Parish church
- Founded: c. 1150
- Consecrated: 1831

Architecture
- Functional status: Active
- Architectural type: Long church
- Completed: 1831 (195 years ago)

Specifications
- Capacity: 150
- Materials: Wood

Administration
- Diocese: Hamar bispedømme
- Deanery: Valdres prosti
- Parish: Volbu
- Norwegian Cultural Heritage Site
- Type: Church
- Status: Automatically protected
- ID: 85862

Volbu Church (Norwegian: Volbu kyrkje) is a parish church of the Church of Norway in Øystre Slidre Municipality in Innlandet county, Norway. It is located in the village of Volbu. It is the church for the Volbu parish which is part of the Valdres prosti (deanery) in the Diocese of Hamar. The white, wooden church was built in a long church design in 1831 using plans drawn up by an unknown architect. The church seats about 150 people.

== History ==
The earliest existing historical records of the church date back to the year 1315, but the church was not built that year. The first church in Volbu was a wooden stave church that was likely built around the year 1150. This church stood on the same site as the present-day church. The church had a long church design with a rectangular nave measuring about 6 by 7 metres (20 ft × 23 ft) and a chancel that measured about 4 by 4 metres (13 ft × 13 ft). There was a 1-metre (3 ft 3 in) wide open-air corridor surrounding the building. During Catholic times, the church was dedicated to St. Blasius and because of this, it was locally known as Blåskyrkja. During the great church auction of 1723, the king sold the church to the local people of the parish.

By the turn of the 19th century, the church had been in poor condition for some time. There was talk of simply closing the church and sending its parishioners tot the nearby Rogne Church. Ultimately, it was decided to demolish the old church and to build a new church on the same site. The old church was torn down in 1830 and the new church was built in 1830–1831. Some of the good materials from the old church were reused in the construction of the new church. A letter from the local provost from March 1831 states that the new church is being constructed and should be finished by June 1831. The new building was consecrated in 1831 (probably in the summer or fall). In 1856, the exterior walls of the church received paneled siding to cover up the logs for the log building and new windows and doors were installed. In 1920, the church was enlarged and renovated. The old church porch was removed and the church was lengthened to the west. This new area included a new porch plus a baptismal waiting room and stairs to the organ gallery and attic. Also, a new sacristy was built on the south side of the choir. (Picture of the church in 1914, before the expansion.) An archaeological survey was carried out under the existing church in 1969 during a renovation and restoration. This survey showed that the old stave church was located on the same plot of land as the present church. In connection with the investigations, a total of 14 coins were found with some dating back to the 14th century or earlier. The oldest coin dated back to the time of King Håkon Håkonsson in the 1200s. Dendrochronological samples from preserved wooden materials from the stave church show that the trees were cut down around the years 1146–1148, meaning the church was likely built around the year 1150.

== See also ==
- List of churches in Hamar
