= Rabalsmellen =

Mountain in Innlandet, Norway

- Rabalsmellin / Rabbalsmellen
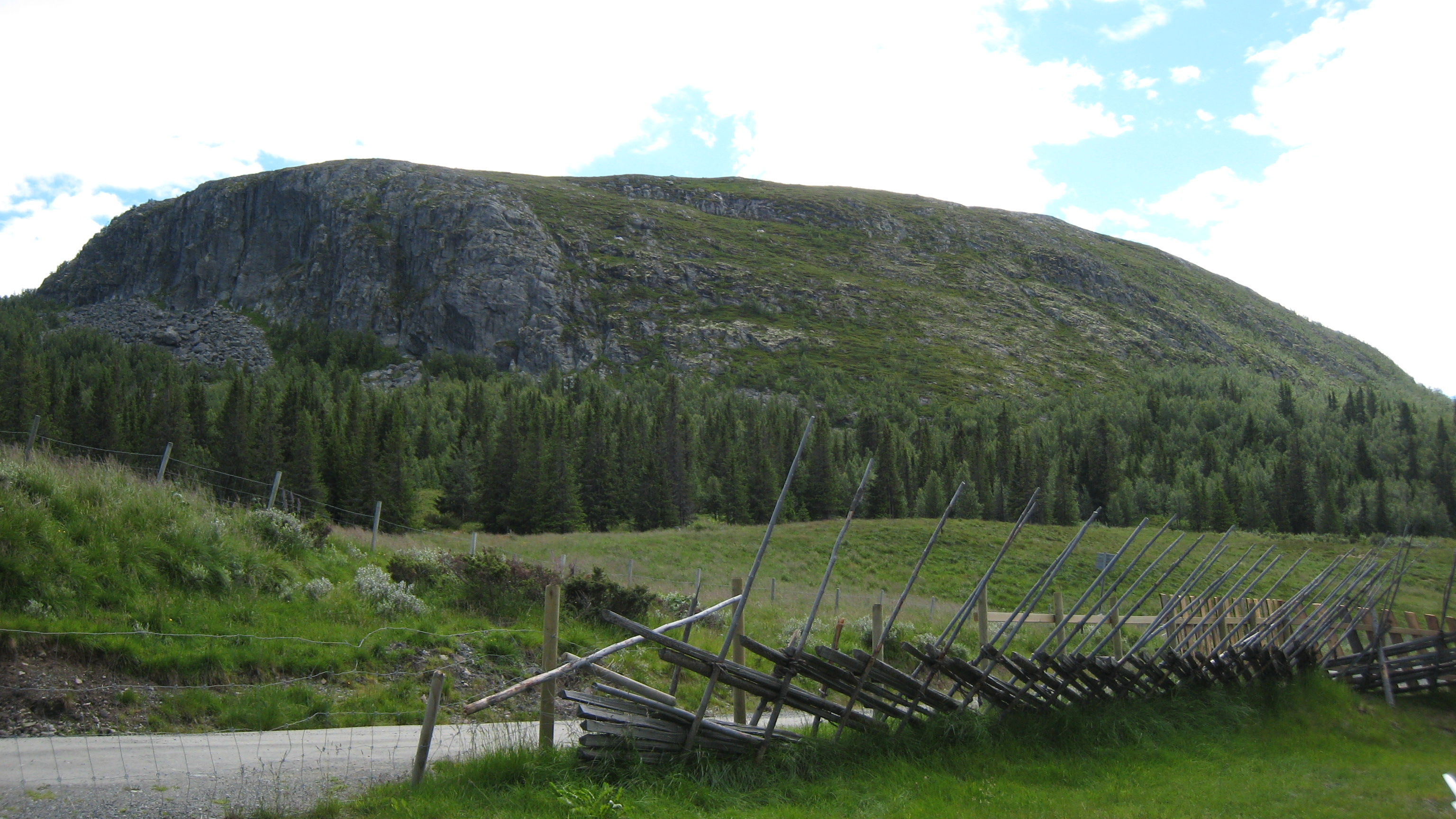

Highest point
- Elevation: 1,111 m (3,645 ft)
- Prominence: 42 m (138 ft)
- Parent peak: Rundemellen
- Isolation: 0.865 km (0.537 mi)
- Coordinates: 61°08′08″N 9°14′14″E

Geography
- Interactive map of the mountain
- Location: Innlandet, Norway

Rabalsmellen is a mountain in Øystre Slidre Municipality in Innlandet county, Norway. The 1,111-metre (3,645 ft) tall mountain is located about 8 kilometres (5.0 mi) northeast of the village of Rogne. The mountain is surrounded by several other notable mountains including Rundemellen, Store Kalvemellen, and Skarvemellen to the south.

== See also ==
- List of mountains of Norway by height
