= Store Kalvemellen =

Mountain in Innlandet, Norway

- Store Kalvemellin
- Interactive map of the mountain

Highest point
- Elevation: 1,136 m (3,727 ft)
- Prominence: 81 m (266 ft)
- Parent peak: Rundemellen
- Isolation: 0.735 km (0.457 mi)
- Coordinates: 61°06′06″N 9°15′31″E

Geography
- Location: Innlandet, Norway

Store Kalvemellen is a mountain in Øystre Slidre Municipality in Innlandet county, Norway. The 1,136-metre (3,727 ft) tall mountain is located about 7 kilometres (4.3 mi) east of the village of Rogne. The mountain is surrounded by several other notable mountains including Skarvemellen to the south, Rundemellen to the northwest, and Rabalsmellen to the north.

== See also ==
- List of mountains of Norway by height
