= Rundemellen =

Mountain in Innlandet, Norway

- Rundemellin
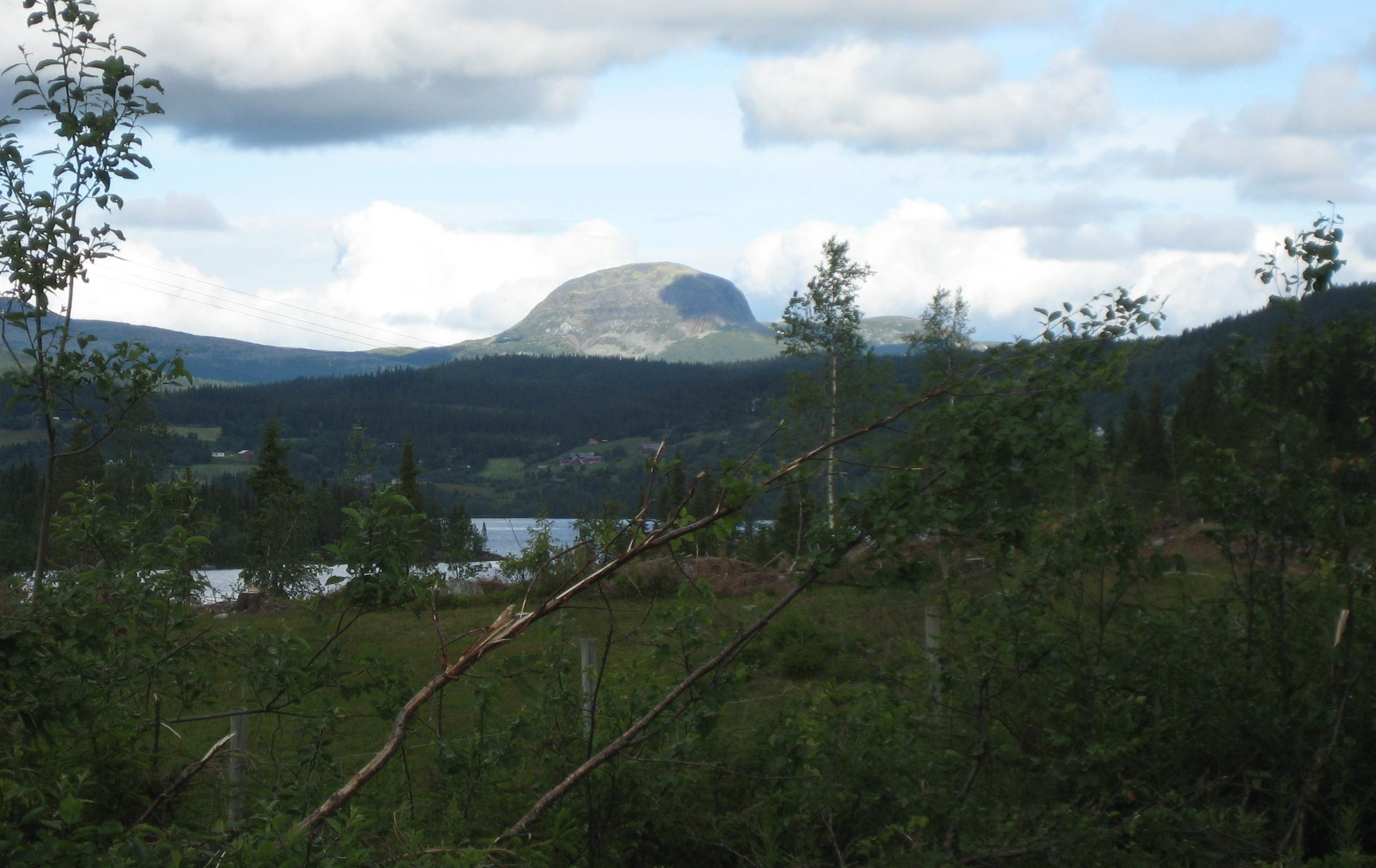

Highest point
- Elevation: 1,351 m (4,432 ft)
- Prominence: 463 m (1,519 ft)
- Isolation: 19.3 km (12.0 mi)
- Coordinates: 61°06′25″N 9°15′01″E

Geography
- Interactive map of the mountain
- Location: Innlandet, Norway

Rundemellen is a mountain in Øystre Slidre Municipality in Innlandet county, Norway. The 1,351-metre (4,432 ft) tall mountain is located about 7 kilometres (4.3 mi) east of the village of Rogne. The mountain is surrounded by several other notable mountains including Skarvemellen to the south, Store Kalvemellen to the southeast, and Rabalsmellen to the north.

== See also ==
- List of mountains of Norway by height
