= Torleiv Bolstad =

Norwegian musician and Hardanger fiddle player (1915–1979)

- Born: 25 October 1915; Øystre Slidre, Oppland county, Norway
- Died: 10 February 1979 (aged 63); Oslo, Norway
- Occupations: musician and Hardanger fiddler

Torleiv Bolstad (25 October 1915 – 10 February 1979) was a Norwegian musician and Hardanger fiddle player. He won the Norwegian Landskappleiken (National Fiddle Contest) four times, in 1947, 1957, 1970 and 1971.

== Biography ==
Bolstad was born in Øystre Slidre Municipality in Oppland county, Norway in 1915, and grew up in the village, where he learnt traditional Norwegian music from Ola Okshovd and Engebret Beitohaugen. He learnt many traditional tunes during his childhood and got his first fiddle at the age of ten.

He moved to Oslo in 1947 where he worked with Kjetil Løndal, and the two were regarded as the best concert fiddlers at the time. Bolstad was known for his clean style and good stroke, maintaining a good dance rhythm, and was conscious of the quality of the dancing and the dialogue between dancer and musician. He lived in Oslo until 1960 and worked there as a painter.

He moved back to Valdres in the early sixties and made a major contribution to the revival of local folk music tradition there. In 1966 he was engaged as a folk music instructor and a number of fiddling groups were established in the area. Among his pupils were his great-nephew and renowned fiddler Tore Bolstad, as well as Harald Røine, Olav Jørgen Hegge and Trygve Bolstad, who names Torleiv Bolstad as one of his most important teachers.

Bolstad gave concerts in many countries in Scandinavia and Europe and was presented the Cultural Prize of Valdres in 1969 for his internationally significant cultural contributions. In 1970 he won first awards on the Hardanger fiddle in all national competitions in Norway.

In 1971, Bolstad performed in Decorah, Iowa, United States at the Norwegian-American Folk Music Festival, which was part of the Decorah Nordic Fest (July 23–25), with a group of dancers which included his wife Kjellaug. He also gave instruction to experienced players of the Hardanger or regular violin at the same event. He then went on to play at the Folklore Village Summer Festival in Dodgevill on 3 August, a Norwegian Midsummer Celebration in Wakefield on 4 August, and in Story City on 5 August.

After Torleiv Bolstad's death in 1979, the folk music work that Torleiv had established in Valdres in the 1960s and 1970s was carried on by Trygve Bolstad, who moved back to Valdres to take over the role.

The Torleiv Bolstad Memorial Fund was established to provide grants to young folk musicians. These are awarded at the annual Jørn Hilme-stemnet folk festival. Winners have included Gudrun Helene Lunde in 2003 and Hallgrim Hansegård in 2005.

== Works ==
Bolstad's only commercial recording was Feletona Oppunde Bitihødn which contains the following tracks:

- Springar Etter Jøger Sagahaugen
- Sjåheimen
- Gjartrud På Haukeland
- Springaren Av Nils Beitohaugen
- Thpmasklukkudn På Filefjell
- Trumpen Hass Trond
- Bjøllelåtten
- Lydarlått
- Svein I Sy'Garde'
- I Kvelds-Setun
- Springar Etter Reishagen
- Låtten Hass Nils På Tørto
- Hengslelåttane
- Fjellbekken
- Spor 15
