= Beito =

Beito is a surname. Notable people with the surname include:

- David T. Beito (born 1956), American historian and professor
- Linda Royster Beito, American political scientist
- Olav Beito (1901–1989), Norwegian linguist and professor

== See also ==
- Beto
