= Nedre Heimdalsvatn =

Lake in Innlandet, Norway

- Interactive map of the lake
- Location: Vågå Municipality, Innlandet
- Coordinates: 61°26′05″N 09°02′19″E
- Basin countries: Norway
- Max. length: 10.7 kilometres (6.6 mi)
- Max. width: 800 metres (2,600 ft)
- Surface area: 7.2221 km^{2} (2.7885 sq mi)
- Shore length^{1}: 26.23 kilometres (16.30 mi)
- Surface elevation: 1,053 metres (3,455 ft)
- References: NVE
- ^{1} Shore length is not a well-defined measure.

Nedre Heimdalsvatn is a lake in Vågå Municipality in Innlandet county, Norway. It is located in the far eastern edge of the Jotunheimen mountain range. The 7.21-square-kilometre (2.78 sq mi) lake sits at an elevation of 1,053 metres (3,455 ft) above sea level, just to the southeast of the mountain Heimdalshøe. The southern end of the lake forms the boundary between Vågå Municipality and Øystre Slidre Municipality.

== See also ==
- List of lakes in Norway
