= Volbu =

Village in Øystre Slidre Municipality, Norway

- Village
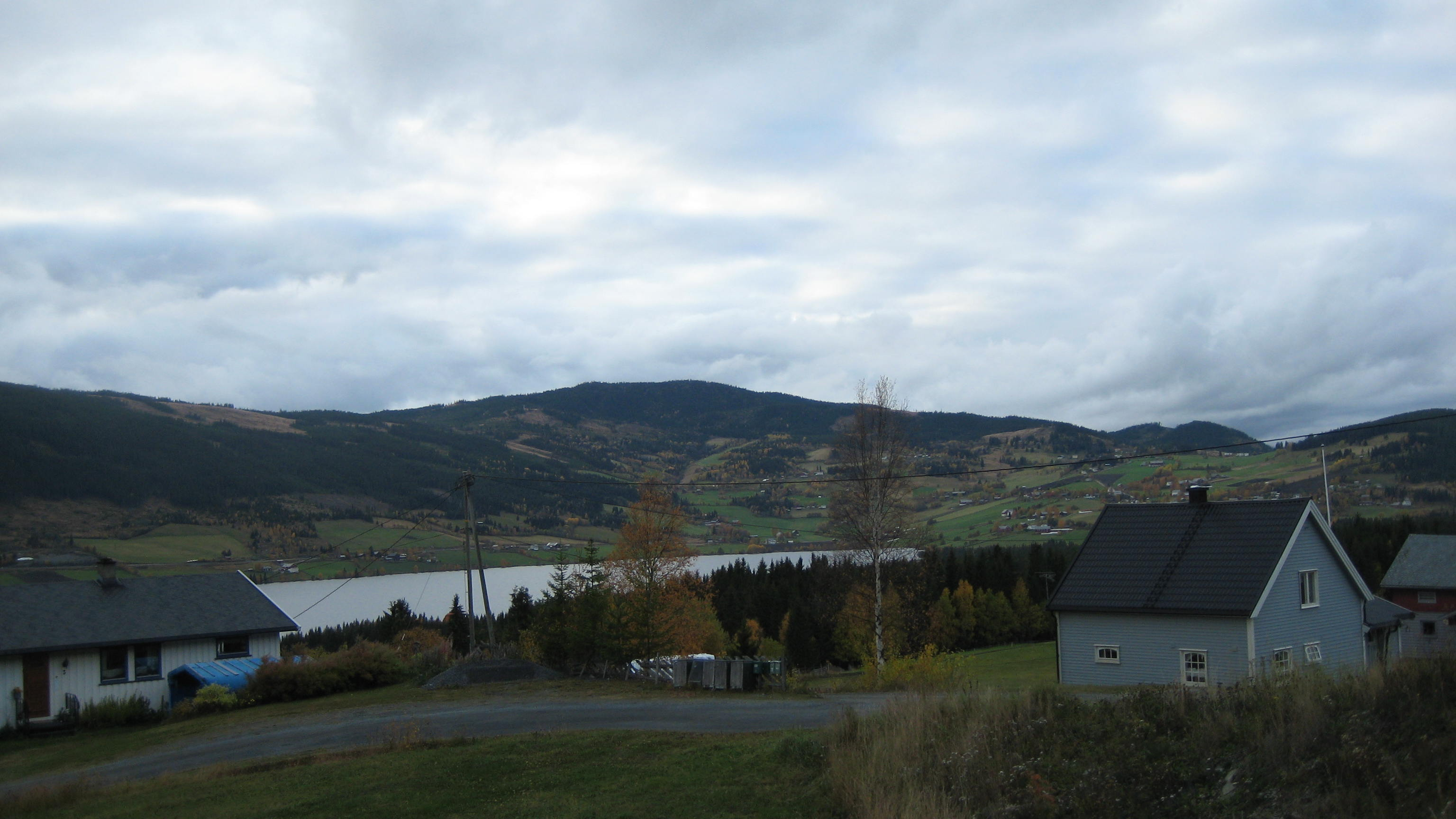
- View of the village area
- Interactive map of Volbu
- Location within Innlandet Location within Norway
- Coordinates: 61.12063°N 9.05915°E
- Country: Norway
- Region: Eastern Norway
- County: Innlandet
- District: Valdres
- Municipality: Øystre Slidre Municipality
- Elevation: 523 m (1,716 ft)
- Time zone: UTC+01:00 (CET)
  - Summer (DST): UTC+02:00 (CEST)
- Post Code: 2940 Heggenes

Volbu is a village in Øystre Slidre Municipality in Innlandet county, Norway. The village is located on a hillside between the lakes Heggefjorden and Volbufjorden. The village of Heggenes lies about 3 kilometres (1.9 mi) to the north, the village of Moane lies about 2 kilometres (1.2 mi) to the east, and the village of Rogne lies about 6 kilometres (3.7 mi) to the southeast. Volbu Church is located in this village.

== Climate ==
Climate data for Løken i Volbu 1991-2020 (521 m)
Month	Jan	Feb	Mar	Apr	May	Jun	Jul	Aug	Sep	Oct	Nov	Dec	Year
Mean daily maximum °C (°F)	−3.3 (26.1)	−1.8 (28.8)	2.9 (37.2)	7.5 (45.5)	12.6 (54.7)	17.1 (62.8)	19.7 (67.5)	17.9 (64.2)	13.4 (56.1)	6.2 (43.2)	0.6 (33.1)	−3.2 (26.2)	7.5 (45.5)
Daily mean °C (°F)	−7.2 (19.0)	−6.3 (20.7)	−2.3 (27.9)	2.5 (36.5)	7.3 (45.1)	11.8 (53.2)	14.4 (57.9)	12.8 (55.0)	8.6 (47.5)	2.6 (36.7)	−2.7 (27.1)	−6.8 (19.8)	2.9 (37.2)
Average precipitation mm (inches)	46 (1.8)	30 (1.2)	34 (1.3)	31 (1.2)	48 (1.9)	72 (2.8)	82 (3.2)	86 (3.4)	55 (2.2)	57 (2.2)	52 (2.0)	39 (1.5)	632 (24.7)
Source 1: Yr (precipitation)
Source 2: NOAA - WMO averages 91-2020 Norway
