= Skammestein =

Village in Øystre Slidre Municipality, Norway

- Village
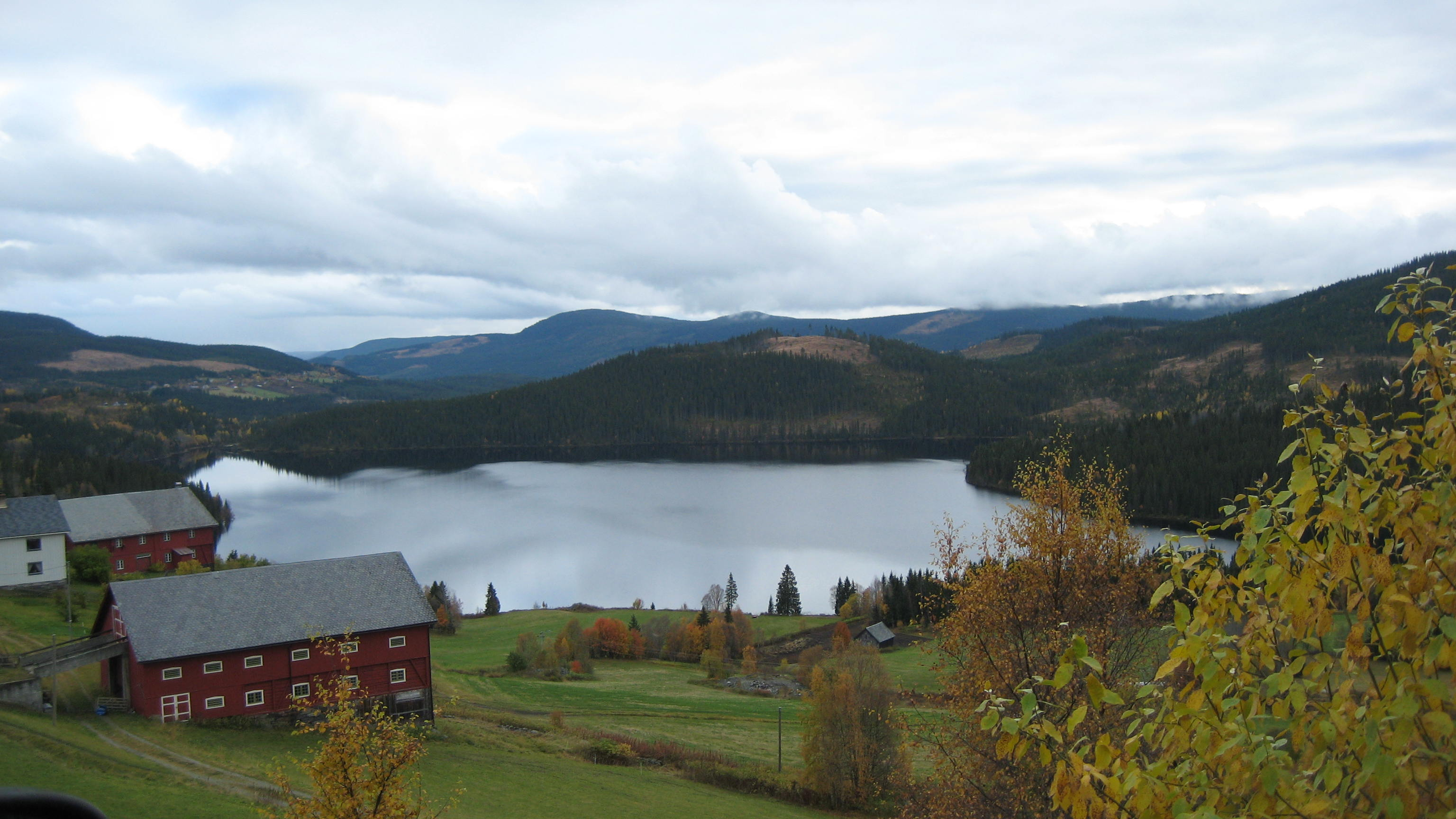
- View of the village
- Interactive map of Skammestein
- Location within Innlandet Location within Norway
- Coordinates: 61.19814°N 8.98189°E
- Country: Norway
- Region: Eastern Norway
- County: Innlandet
- District: Valdres
- Municipality: Øystre Slidre Municipality
- Elevation: 735 m (2,411 ft)
- Time zone: UTC+01:00 (CET)
  - Summer (DST): UTC+02:00 (CEST)
- Post Code: 2950 Skammestein

Skammestein is a village in Øystre Slidre Municipality in Innlandet county, Norway. The village is located on a hillside overlooking the east shore of the lake Hedalsfjorden. The village of Beitostølen lies about 7 kilometres (4.3 mi) to the northwest and the villages of Hegge and Heggenes are located about 7 kilometres (4.3 mi) to the southeast. Lidar Church is located in the village, along the Norwegian County Road 51.
