= Moane =

Village in Øystre Slidre Municipality, Norway

- Village
- Interactive map of Moane
- Location within Innlandet Location within Norway
- Coordinates: 61.12525°N 9.09548°E
- Country: Norway
- Region: Eastern Norway
- County: Innlandet
- District: Valdres
- Municipality: Øystre Slidre Municipality

Area
  - Total: 0.65 km^{2} (0.25 sq mi)
- Elevation: 537 m (1,762 ft)

Population (2024)
  - Total: 350
  - Density: 538/km^{2} (1,390/sq mi)
- Time zone: UTC+01:00 (CET)
  - Summer (DST): UTC+02:00 (CEST)
- Post Code: 2943 Rogne

Moane is a village in Øystre Slidre Municipality in Innlandet county, Norway. The village is located on the east side of the river Volbuelve, on a hillside between the lakes Heggefjorden and Volbufjorden. The village of Heggenes lies about 3 kilometres (1.9 mi) to the northwest, the village of Volbu lies about 2 kilometres (1.2 mi) to the west, and the village of Rogne lies about 3.5 kilometres (2.2 mi) to the southeast. The Norwegian County Road 51 runs through the village.

The 0.65-square-kilometre (160-acre) village has a population (2024) of 350 and a population density of 538 inhabitants per square kilometre (1,390/sq mi).

== Climate ==
Climate data for Løken i Volbu 1991-2020 (521 m)
Month	Jan	Feb	Mar	Apr	May	Jun	Jul	Aug	Sep	Oct	Nov	Dec	Year
Mean daily maximum °C (°F)	−3.3 (26.1)	−1.8 (28.8)	2.9 (37.2)	7.5 (45.5)	12.6 (54.7)	17.1 (62.8)	19.7 (67.5)	17.9 (64.2)	13.4 (56.1)	6.2 (43.2)	0.6 (33.1)	−3.2 (26.2)	7.5 (45.5)
Daily mean °C (°F)	−7.2 (19.0)	−6.3 (20.7)	−2.3 (27.9)	2.5 (36.5)	7.3 (45.1)	11.8 (53.2)	14.4 (57.9)	12.8 (55.0)	8.6 (47.5)	2.6 (36.7)	−2.7 (27.1)	−6.8 (19.8)	2.9 (37.2)
Average precipitation mm (inches)	46 (1.8)	30 (1.2)	34 (1.3)	31 (1.2)	48 (1.9)	72 (2.8)	82 (3.2)	86 (3.4)	55 (2.2)	57 (2.2)	52 (2.0)	39 (1.5)	632 (24.7)
Source 1: Yr (precipitation)
Source 2: NOAA - WMO averages 91-2020 Norway
