= Ole Haldorsen Bjelbøle =

Norwegian politician

Ole Haldorsen Bjelbøle (23 August 1879 – 1953) was a Norwegian farmer and politician for the Agrarian Party.

He was born at Bjelbøle in Øystre Slidre Municipality as a son of farmers Haldor Knutsen Bjelbøle (1839–1899) and Marit Hauge (1843–1925). He finished middle school in 1897, then Storhove Agricultural School in 1900 and the Norwegian College of Agriculture in 1902. He was a farmer his entire career; from 1905 at the family farm Bjelbøle.

He was a member of the municipal council of Øystre Slidre Municipality from 1919 to 1925 and 1928 to 1934. He was also a county politician in Oppland. He was elected as a deputy representative to the Parliament of Norway in 1933 from the constituency Oppland, and was re-elected in 1936. He was the deputy of Erling Bjørnson. During World War II Bjørnson became a Nasjonal Samling member, which after the war was seen as treason; he was relieved of his suffrage among other things. As the pre-war Parliament reconvened for some months in 1945, Bjelbøle thus filled in for Bjørnson.
