= Hallgrim Hansegård =

Norwegian choreographer and dancer (born 1980)

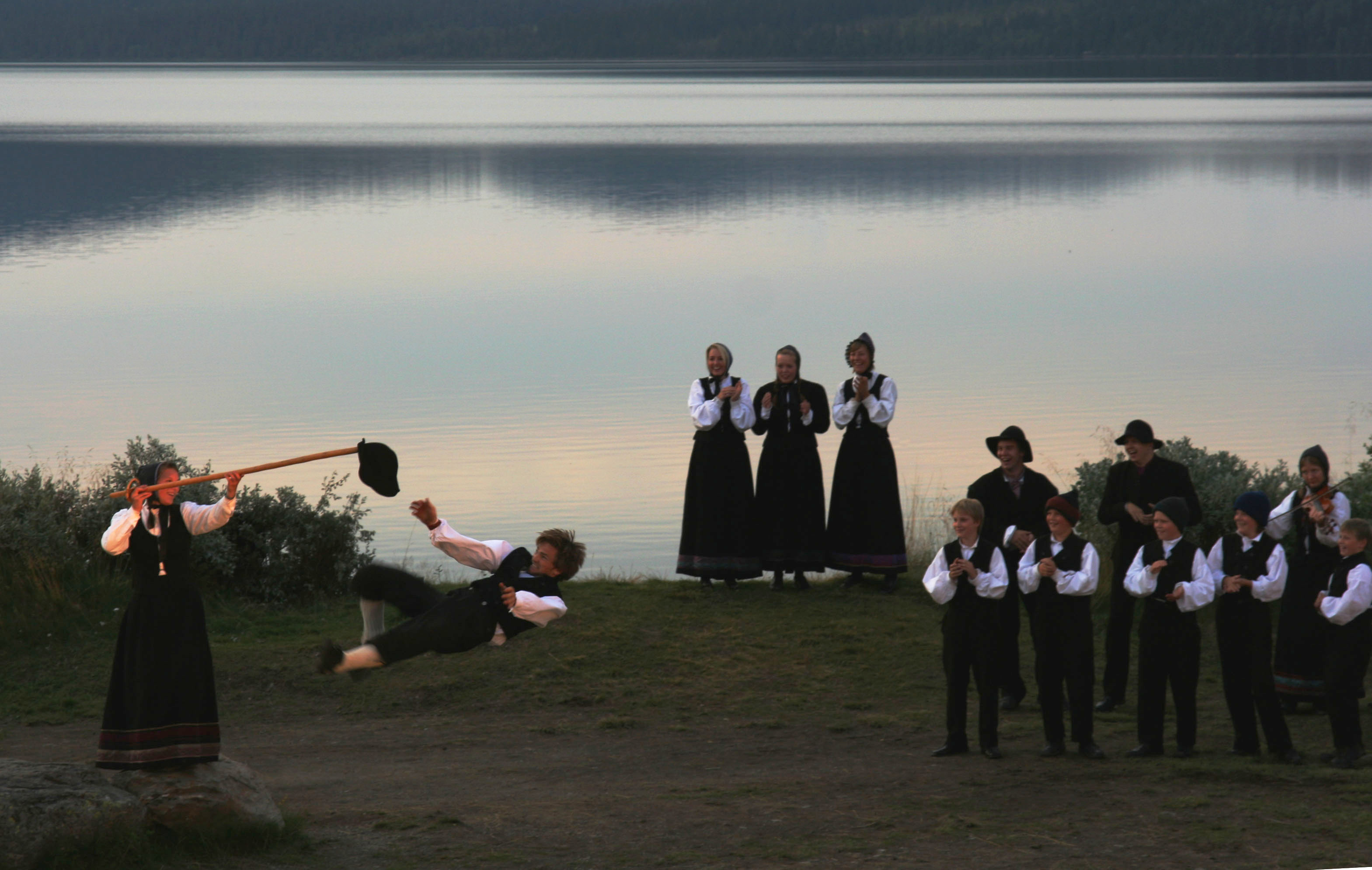
- Hallgrim Hansegård frå FRIKAR dance company performs in Peer Gynt ved Gålåvatnet 2006.
- Born: January 28, 1980 (age 45); Fagernes, Valdres, Norway
- Occupation(s): Dancer, Choreographer, film maker
- Style: Contemporary dance, halling dance
- Website: www.frikar.com

Hallgrim Hansegård (born 28 January 1980 in Valdres, Norway) is a Norwegian choreographer and dancer whose background is rooted in his traditional halling dance training and contemporary dance. He is also known for leading a trio of dancers who danced alongside Alexander Rybak onstage at The Eurovision Song Contest 2009 which his country won.

== Career ==
Described by National Geographic as “wildly inventive” Hallgrim Hansegård has by the age of 30 established his own company and expressive style which has performed in 27 countries. Though his works often are meeting points between different cultures, his research cares about what is pure nature in what we associate with cultural behavior. The Norwegian Broadcasting Corporations dance critic describes Hansegård as a “New-thinking choreographer with a strong will to do his own thing and blessedly uninhibited as far as exceeding boundaries is concerned. It’s very exciting to see folk dance in dialogue with contemporary dance.”

Hallgrim Hansegård was born in 1980 in the mountains of Valdres into a family of miners and shepherds. He began dancing and playing traditional violin at the age of seven, learning the art of up to 90 years old masters in his valley. Since the age of 10 he has been touring as a dancer, and his choreographic works have been performed in 27 countries all over the world.

With a background in Norwegian traditional dance he has been developing a new choreographical style for contemporary dance including Capoeira and break dance. He works in the formats of aerial dance, site specific ecosophical stage arts, indoor dance and interdisciplinary arts.

He was educated at the Academy of Digital Arts in Florence from 2000 to 2003 and Film Arts in Kabelvåg from 2003 to 2005. He is known as the founder and of the Frikar Dance Company.

Hansegård made his international breakthrough with an animation film at the Venice Biennale in 2003 (Tarantrance). In 2005 he won 3rd prize at Superdok. In 2007 he won the award as Folk Music Artist of the Year in Norway. In 2009 he won the award for best choreography at the Eurovision Song Contest 2009, among 43 countries in the most seen entertainment TV program in the world.

In 2010 he premiered "Jamsiis" at Bergen International Festival. This was a highly personal contribution to the Nordic contemporary dance scene, based on his roots in traditional dances. Jamsiis opened up a public discussion about the boundaries of contemporary dance in Norway. NRK (the Norwegian Broadcasting) writes:

JAMSIIS, Hallgrim Hansegårds new production, is the most exciting I have seen here. It’s very exciting to see traditional dance in dialogue with contemporary dance. Hansegård is branching out and opening up new territory here. He has come down a path that I think is very important to go. That Hansegård is a dancer with strong will to do his own thing and blessedly uninhibited as far as exceeding boundaries is concerned is something the Norwegian dance community should be happy about… At the same time that he approaches contemporary dance, he opens doors. If he succeeds in making contemporary dance accessible to a wider audience than today’s, the genre of contemporary dance should learn to endure a ‘halling-roundkick’ or two.

In 2009 Hansegård directed Tidarå, an outdoor full night dance performance under a waterfall with 22 dancers and musicians. The production collected contemporary and traditional dancers in a research for a unique contemporary dance technique. "Tidarå" is part of FRIKARs ecosophical productions. Hansegård directed also Yr in 2009 together with violin virtuoso Ragnhild Hemsing, premiere at the Bergen International Festival.

In 2008 Hansegård was censored by the Roman Catholic Church in Naples for his non conventional interpretation of Peer Gynt, NRK: Bukkerittet. In the years 2005 to 2007 Hansegård directed "Undergrunnsfargo", "Isolations", "Laus", "Kruk", "The snuff grinders" and "Bastard".

He also participated in Dansefeber, the Norwegian version of So You Think You Can Dance, in 2006. In 2008, his dancing was digitalized for the massively multiplayer online role-playing game (MMORPG) Age of Conan: Hyborian Adventures.

== Choreographies / productions ==
- "AP" (2010)
- "JAMSIIS" (2010)
- "Wall dance" (2010)
- "TidarÅ" (2009)
- "YR" (2009)
- "Fairytale" (2009)
- "Mjølk" (2009"
- "Bukkerittet" (2008)
- "THE SNUFF GRINDERS" (2007)
- "KRUK!" (2007)
- "Bastard" (2007)
- "LAUS" (2006)
- "Isolations" (2005)
- "Undergrunnsfargo" (2005)

== Critiques ==
“Wildly Inventive, thrilling performance.” National Geographic

“Maybe the most outstanding and inspiring artist at Bergen International Festival…” Bergens Tidende

“New-thinking choreographer with a strong will to do his own thing and blessedly uninhibited as far as exceeding boundaries is concerned” Dance critic Karen Frøsland Nystøyl, The Norwegian Broadcasting Corporation

“Natural talent.” Sidsel Pape, free-Lancer dance critic

“About to obtain a solid name in the world of dance – well deserved!” Nordlys

“Hallgrim Hansegård brings to contemporary dance a fresh and slightly rough expression.. Innovative, playful and experimental.” Dance critic Silje Birgitte Folkedal, Bergens Tidende

== Awards ==
Hansegård has been the recipient of several awards:

- 2011: Norwegian champion in halling dance, winner of Jørn Hilme-stemnet and the first battle in halling dance, «FRIKAR-tevlinga»
- 2010: Ambassadeur of International Dance Day
- 2009: Award for «Best choreography» at the Eurovision 2009 among 43 European countries
- 2009: Name of the Year, Rural Norway
- 2009: Ambassadeur of Valdres
- 2007: Award for «Artist of the year», The Norwegian Folk Music Awards.
- 2005: 3rd place, SUPERDOK, for the documentary film "Opse"
- 2005: Torleiv Bolstads prize for young musicians
- 2003: Student of the Year, l`Accademia delle arti digitali, Firenze, Italy
