= Olav Beito =

Norwegian linguist

Olav Toreson Beito (March 30, 1901 – September 28, 1989) was a Norwegian linguist and professor of Nordic studies at the University of Oslo.

Beito was born in Øystre Slidre Municipality, the son of the farmer Thore Andreas Beito (1849–1937) and Marit Beito (1858–1932). He married Marit Eker in 1930. Beito earned his candidatus philologiæ degree in 1932 from the University of Oslo, and then taught at schools in Fredrikstad and Oslo. From 1936 to 1939 and in 1948 he taught at the University of Oslo. He received a doctorate in 1942 with a dissertation on r-declension of Old Norse consonant stems. He taught Norwegian at the University of Iceland from 1954 to 1955. He was appointed a docent in Nordic studies in 1957, and a professor in 1959.

Beito published Norske sæternamn (Norwegian Mountain Dairy Farm Names) in 1949 for the Institute for Comparative Research in Human Culture; the work covered about 50,00 such names. His study of gender shifts in Nynorsk determined the ratio between masculine, feminine, and neuter nouns. He edited a number of publications in the series Skrifter frå norsk målførearkiv (Texts from the Norwegian Dialect Archives) and published the collection Norske målføretekster (Norwegian Dialect Texts) in 1963, followed by the collection Artiklar og talar i utval (Selected Articles and Lectures) in 1979. His 1970 Nynorsk grammar (second edition 1986) was the first such work after the one written by Ivar Aasen.

He resided at Jar and died in Oslo.

== Distinctions ==
Beito was made a member of the Norwegian Academy of Science and Letters in 1951.

== Selected works ==
- R-bøygning: etterrøknader i norsk formlære (R-Declension: An Investigation of Norwegian Morphology, 1942)
- Norske sæternamn (Norwegian Mountain Dairy Farm Names, 1949)
- Genusskifte i nynorsk (Gender Shifts in Nynorsk, 1954)
- Norske målføretekster (Norwegian Dialect Texts, 1963)
- Nynorsk grammatikk: Lyd- og ordlære (Nynorsk Grammar: Phonology and Vocabulary, 1970)
- Artiklar og talar i utval (Selected Articles and Lectures, 1979)
