= Hegge, Innlandet =

Village in Øystre Slidre Municipality, Norway

Hegge
- Village
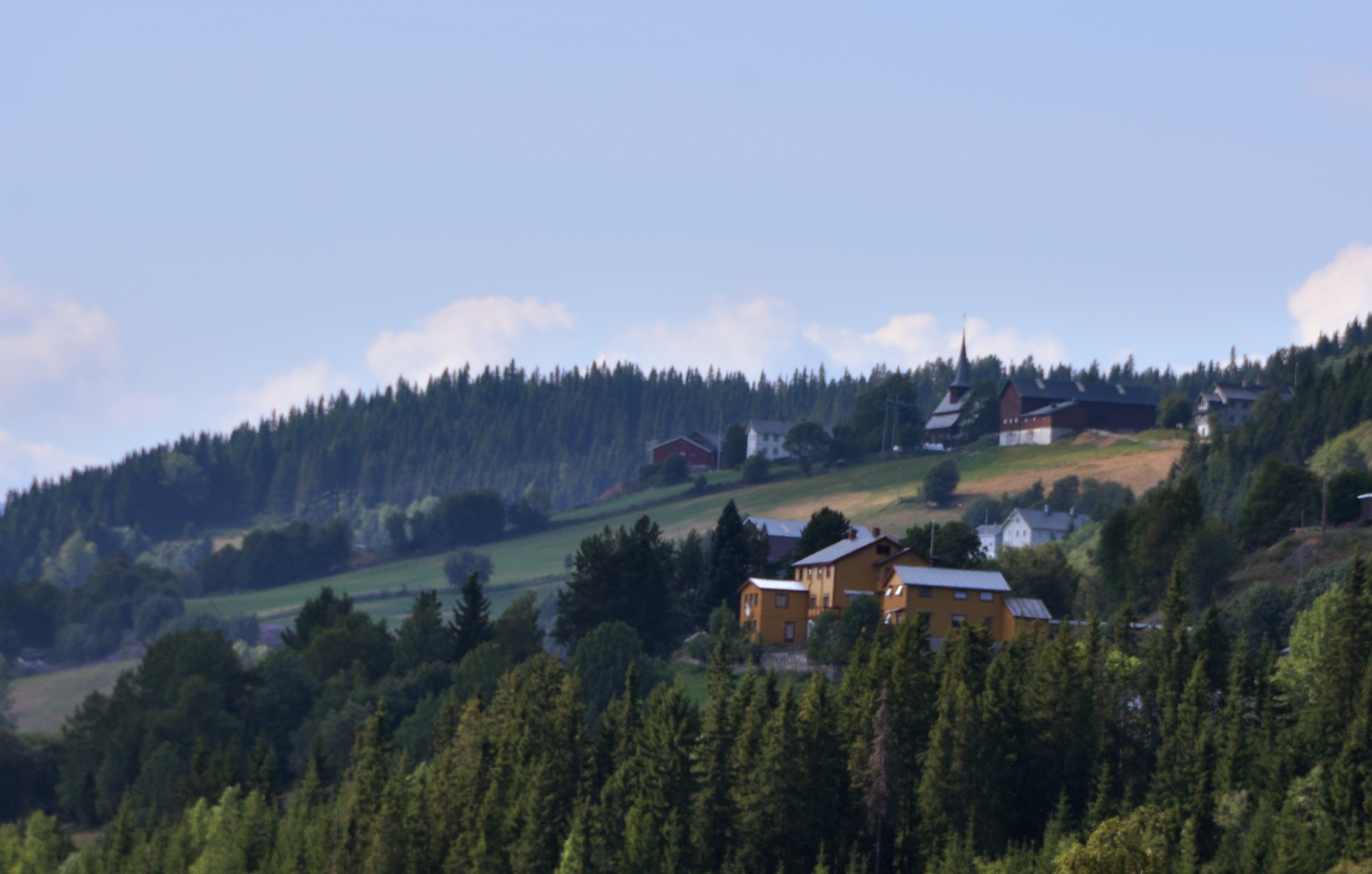
- View of the village
- Interactive map of Hegge
- Location within Innlandet Location within Norway
- Coordinates: 61.15963°N 9.01344°E
- Country: Norway
- Region: Eastern Norway
- County: Innlandet
- District: Valdres
- Municipality: Øystre Slidre Municipality
- Elevation: 631 m (2,070 ft)
- Time zone: UTC+01:00 (CET)
  - Summer (DST): UTC+02:00 (CEST)
- Post Code: 2940 Heggenes

Hegge is a village in Øystre Slidre Municipality in Innlandet county, Norway. The village is located on a hillside overlooking the north shore of the lake Heggefjorden. The village of Heggenes lies about 3.5 kilometres (2.2 mi) to the southeast and the village of Skammestein lies about 5 kilometres (3.1 mi) to the northwest. The Norwegian County Road 51 runs through the village. The medieval Hegge Stave Church is located in the rural village.
