= Hegge Stave Church =

Church in Innlandet, Norway

- Hegge stavkyrkje
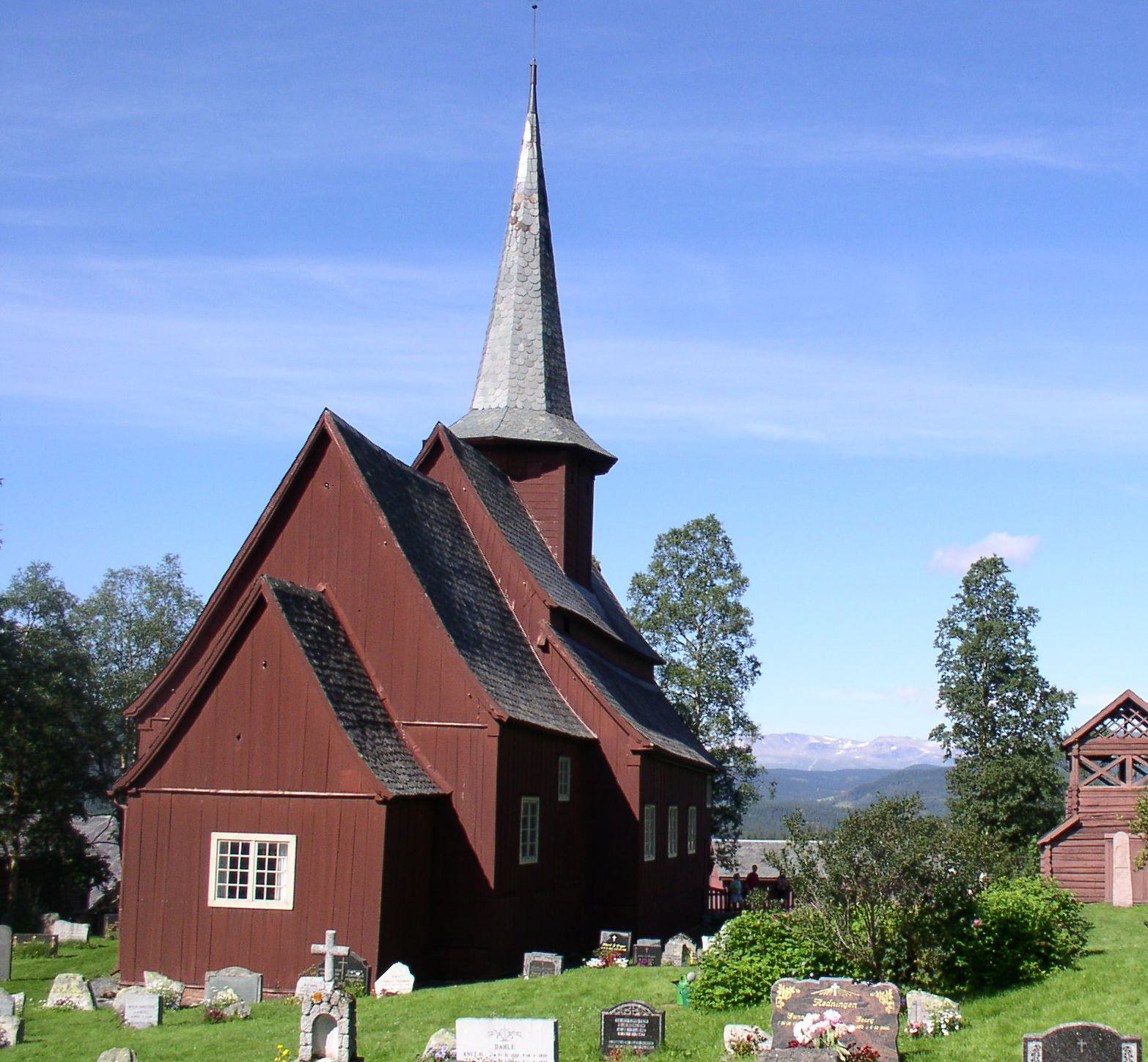
- View of the church
- Hegge Stave Church
- 61°09′28″N 9°01′25″E
- Location: Øystre Slidre, Innlandet
- Country: Norway
- Denomination: Church of Norway
- Previous denomination: Catholic Church
- Churchmanship: Evangelical Lutheran

History
- Status: Parish church
- Founded: c. 1216
- Consecrated: c. 1216

Architecture
- Functional status: Active
- Architectural type: Long church
- Style: Stave church
- Completed: c. 1216 (810 years ago)

Specifications
- Capacity: 150
- Materials: Wood

Administration
- Diocese: Hamar bispedømme
- Deanery: Valdres prosti
- Parish: Hegge
- Norwegian Cultural Heritage Site
- Type: Church
- Status: Automatically protected
- ID: 84516

Hegge Stave Church (Norwegian: Hegge stavkyrkje) is a 13th-century stave church in Norway. It is a parish church of the Church of Norway in Øystre Slidre Municipality in Innlandet county. It is located in the village of Hegge. It is the church for the Hegge parish which is part of the Valdres prosti (deanery) in the Diocese of Hamar. The brown, wooden church was built in a long church design around the year 1216 using plans drawn up by an unknown architect. The church seats about 150 people.

== History ==
The earliest existing historical records of the church date back to the year 1322, but the church was not new that year. The church at Hegge is a wooden stave church that was built during the early 13th century. Modern dendrochronological dating of some of the logs in the church indicates that the church was built around the year 1215-1216. It is a basilica type church with 8 free-standing interior columns called staves that form an arcade, surrounding a central area with a raised roof. A runic inscription on the church reads: «Erlingr Arnason ristet disse runer» which is translated as Erling Arnason wrote these runes. Externally, the church is fairly similar to the nearby Lomen Stave Church. It is a long church with a rectangular nave with a smaller, narrower choir. There is a tower on the roof of the nave and there were open-air corridors surrounding the church.

After the Protestant Reformation, ridge turrets were raised, which changed the external appearances. After an inspection on 23 January 1665, it is stated that the church was very dilapidated. Soon after this, an extensive restoration and renovation project was carried out. In 1706 and in 1712, some repair work repairs were made on the church. The altarpiece was carved by a local artist in 1780. The choir was expanded in 1807, giving it a rectangular floor plan. In 1844, the nave was extended to the west. Also at that time, open-air corridors on the sides of the church were incorporated into the nave which provided more room for seating. A sacristy was built to the east of the choir in 1864. Major repair was carried out in 1924-1925 to repair rot damage and the settling of the foundation. This project was led by the architect Arnstein Arneberg, who later conducted extensive renovation of the Hamar Cathedral. The church got a new foundation and the rotting parts of the structure were replaced. The church porch was enlarged. Also at this time, new, smaller windows were installed.

== Inventory ==
The 13th-century baptismal font is externally decorated with ornaments of knots, trees, human figures, and stars. A vestment at the church, made of coarse linen dates from 1686, and a painting of Isaac's Sacrifice was presented to the church in 1643.

== Media gallery ==
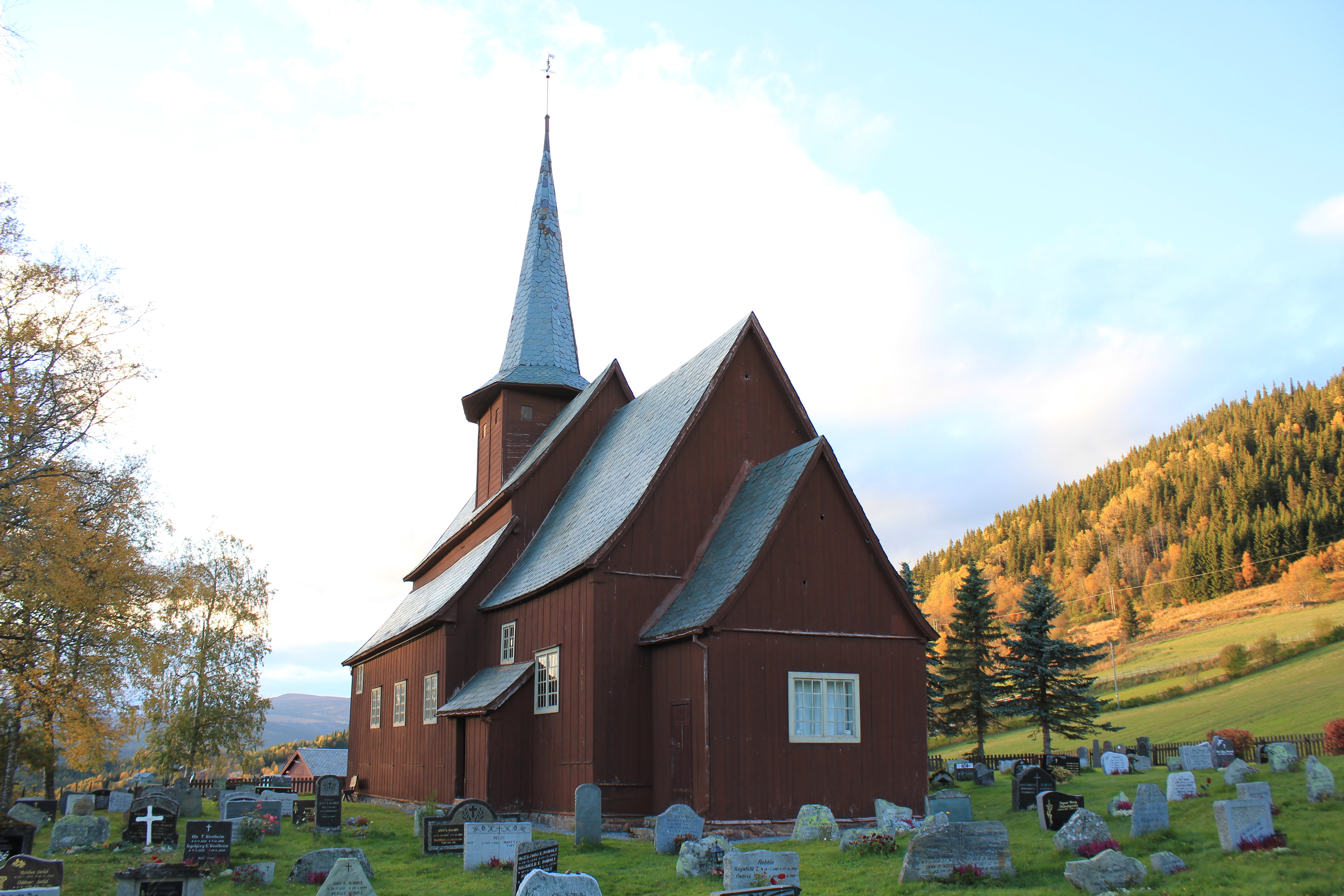

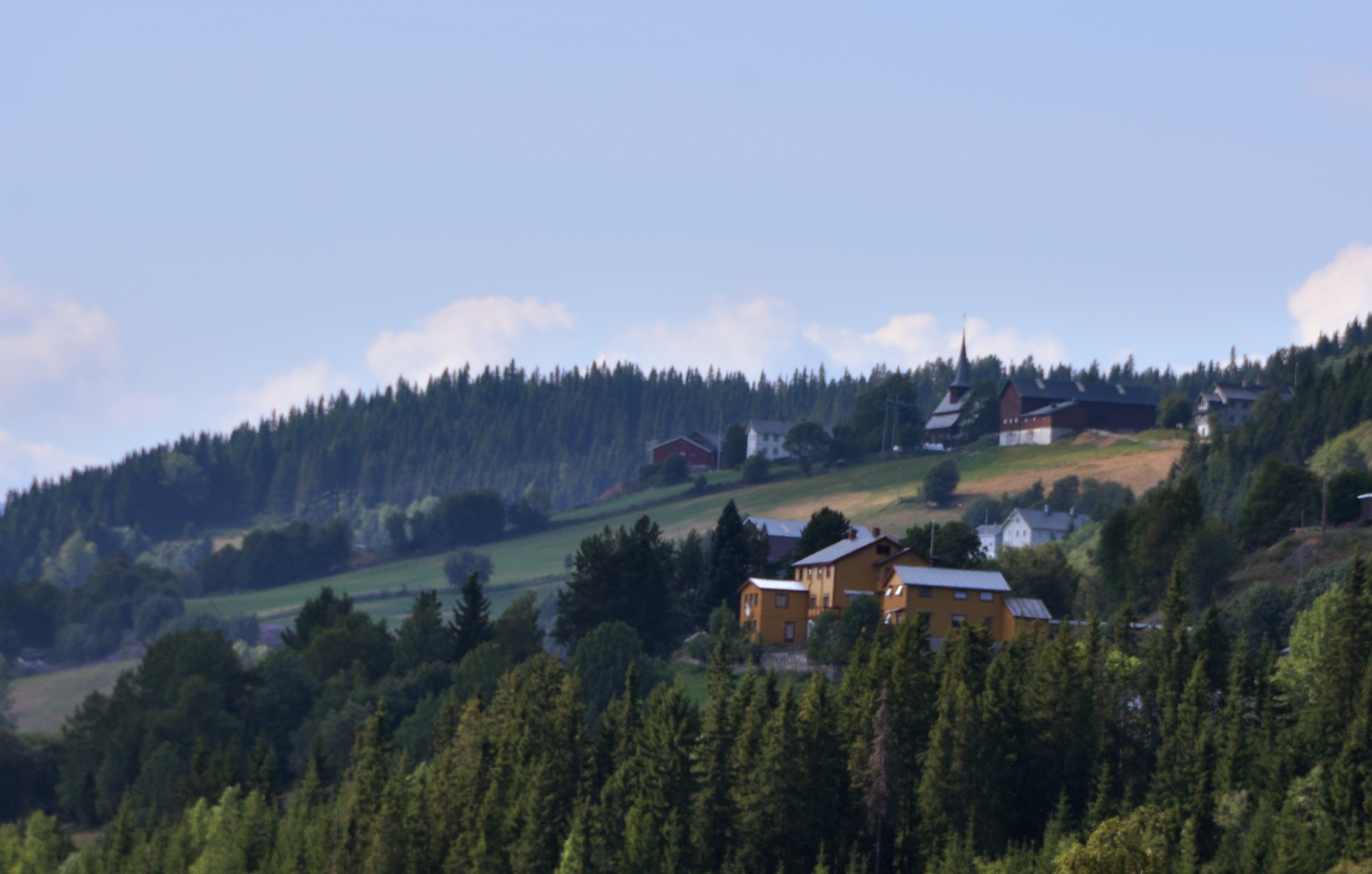

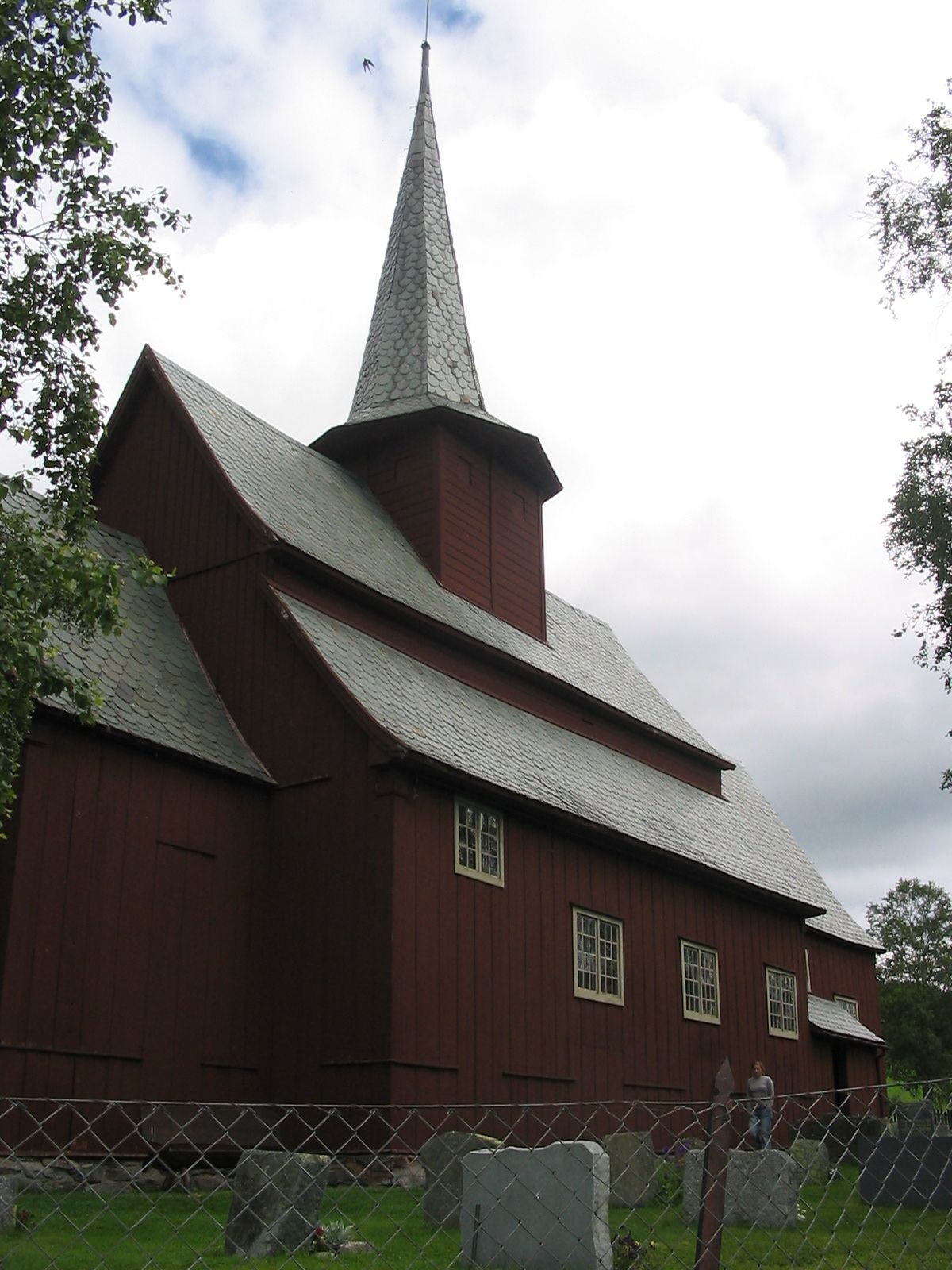

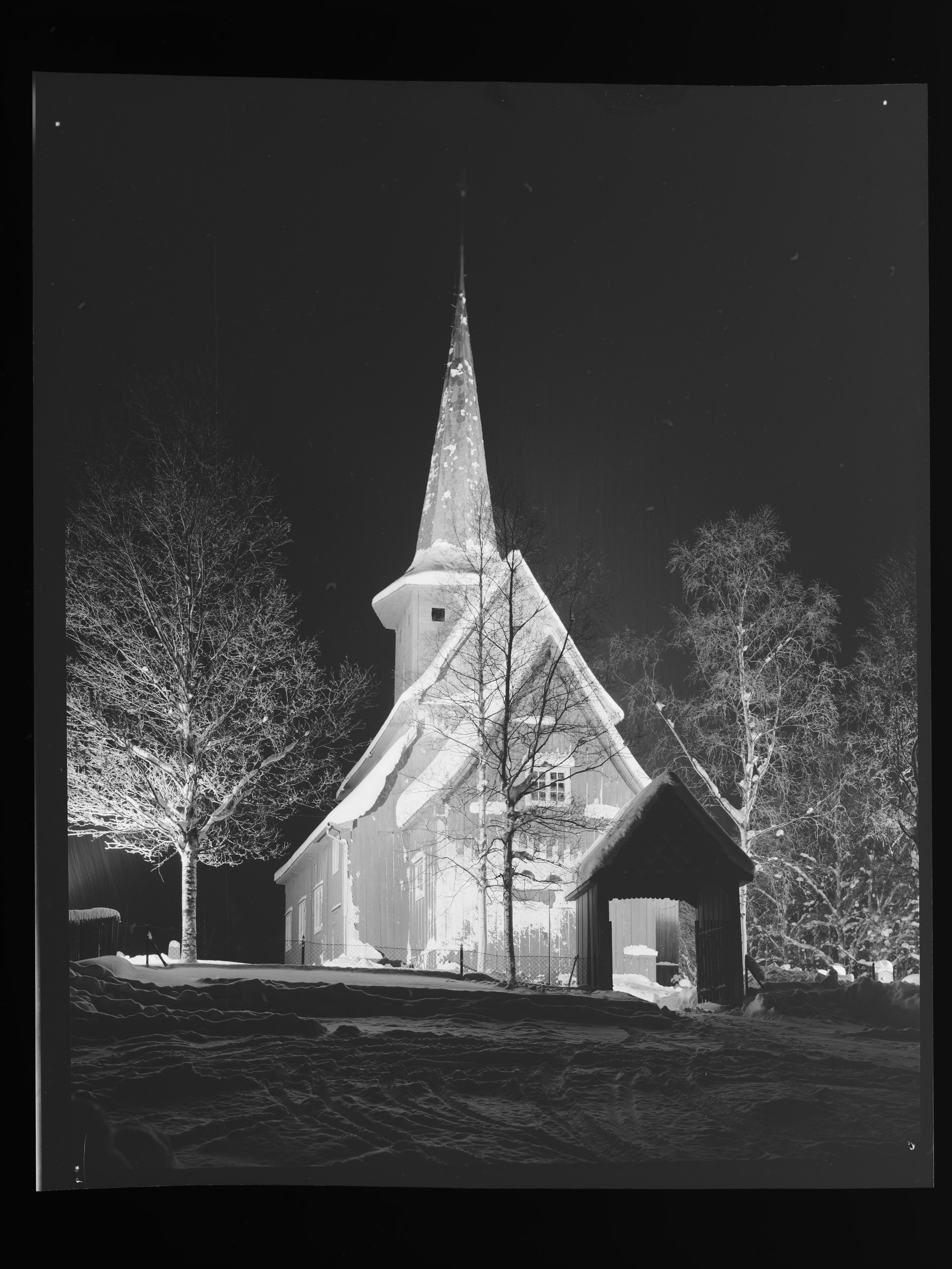

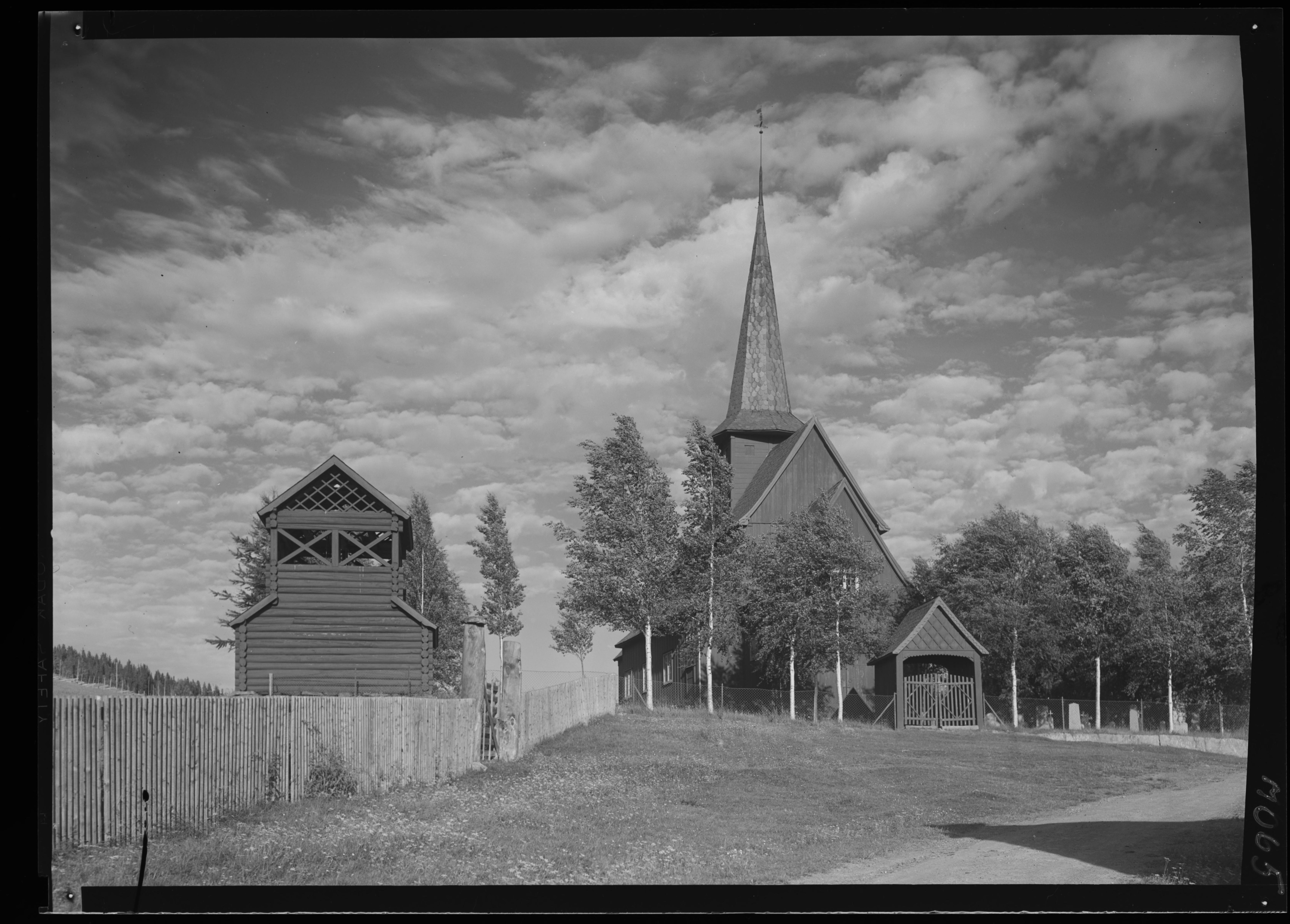

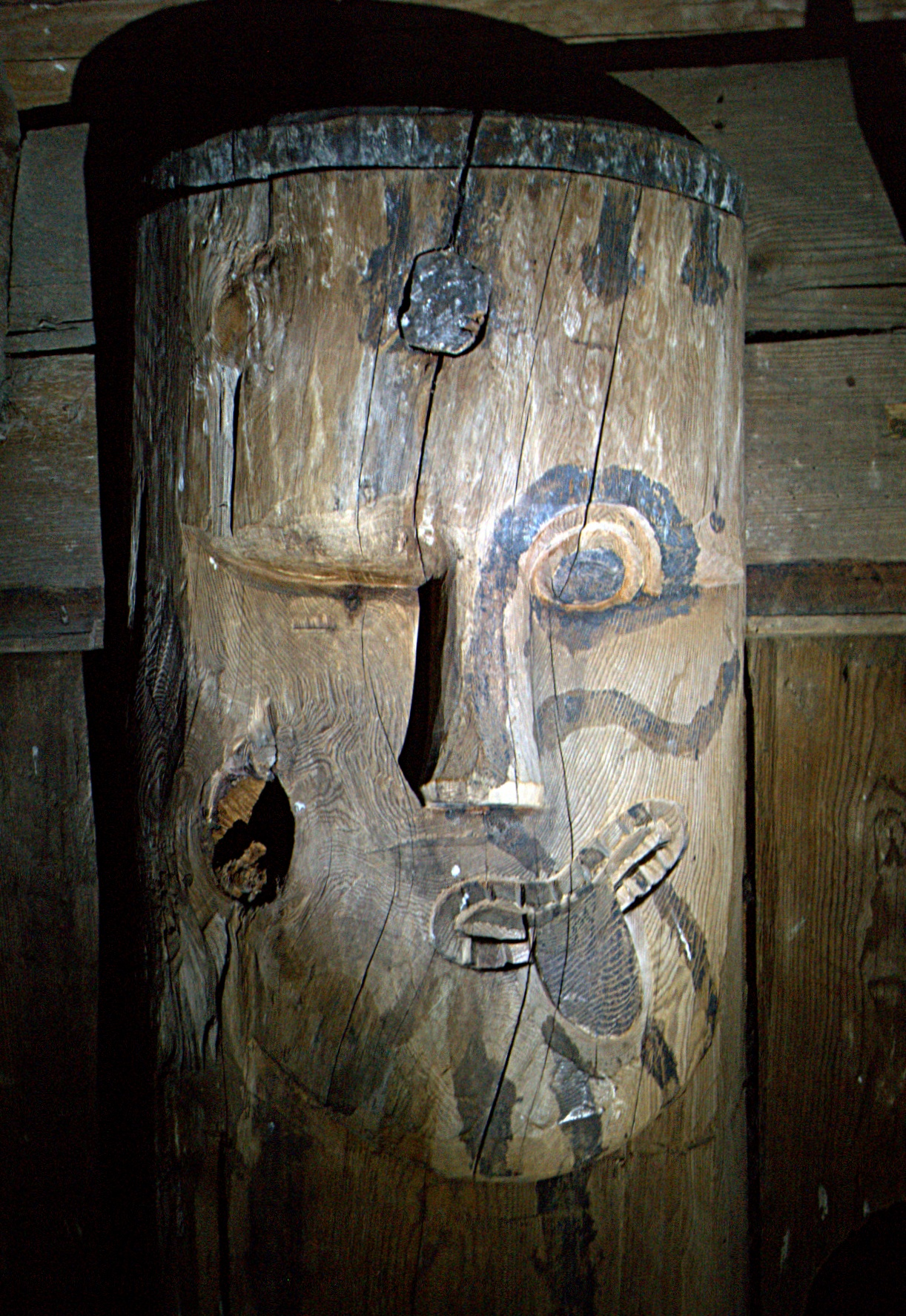
Detail from the top of one of the interior staves

== See also ==
- List of churches in Hamar
