= Rogne Church =

Church in Innlandet, Norway

- Rogne kyrkje
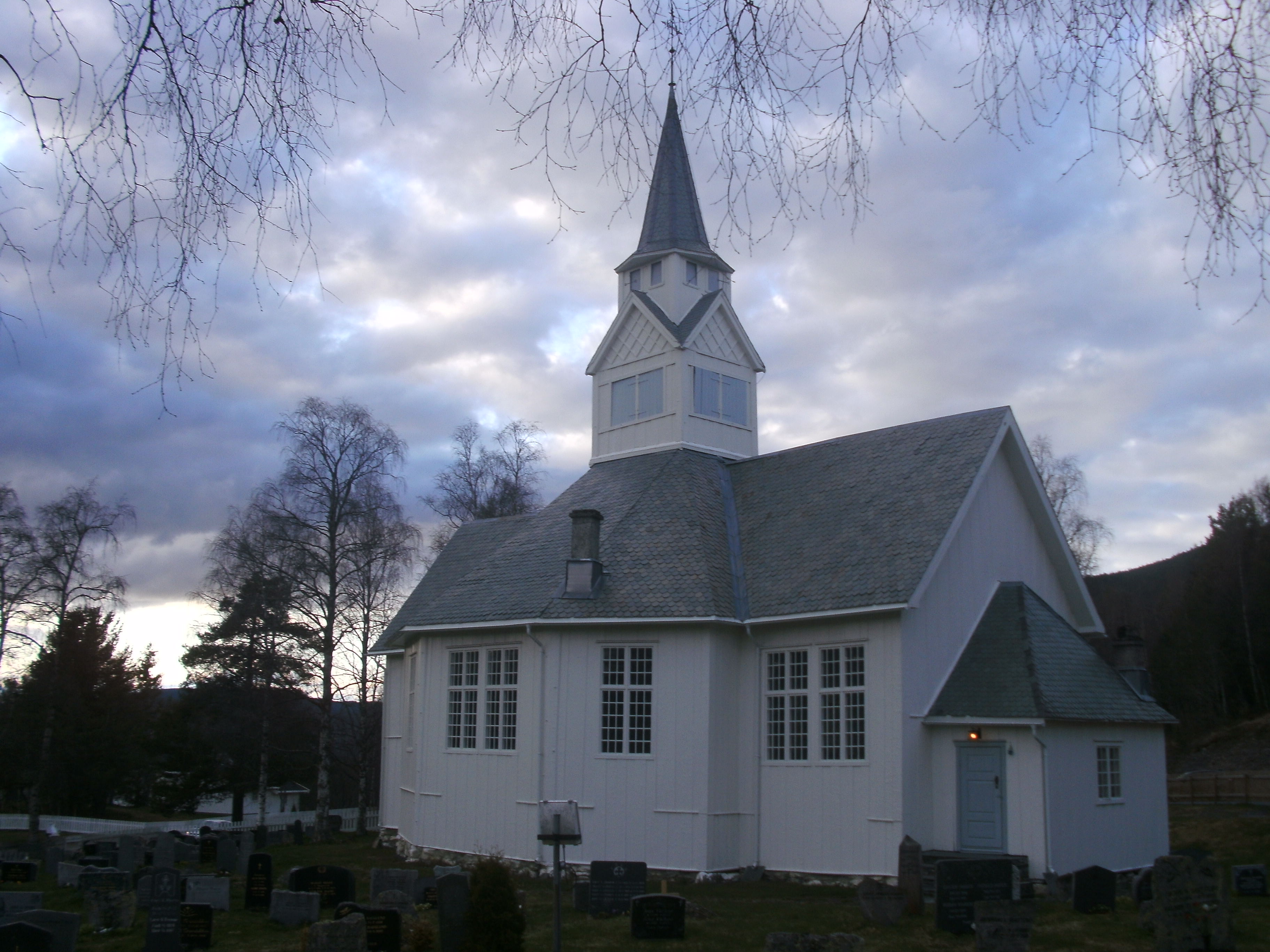
- View of the church
- Rogne Church
- 61°05′16″N 9°07′28″E
- Location: Øystre Slidre, Innlandet
- Country: Norway
- Denomination: Church of Norway
- Previous denomination: Catholic Church
- Churchmanship: Evangelical Lutheran

History
- Status: Parish church
- Founded: 13th century
- Consecrated: 1857

Architecture
- Functional status: Active
- Architect: Chr. H. Grosch
- Architectural type: Octagonal
- Completed: 1857 (169 years ago)

Specifications
- Capacity: 200
- Materials: Wood

Administration
- Diocese: Hamar bispedømme
- Deanery: Valdres prosti
- Parish: Rogne
- Norwegian Cultural Heritage Site
- Type: Church
- Status: Protected
- ID: 85308

Rogne Church (Norwegian: Rogne kyrkje) is a parish church of the Church of Norway in Øystre Slidre Municipality in Innlandet county, Norway. It is located in the village of Rogne. It is the church for the Rogne parish which is part of the Valdres prosti (deanery) in the Diocese of Hamar. The white, wooden church was built in an octagonal design in 1857 using plans drawn up by the architect Christian Heinrich Grosch. The church seats about 200 people.

== History ==
The earliest existing historical records of the church date back to the year 1327, but the church was not built that year. The first church in Rogne was a wooden stave church that was likely built during the 13th century. This church was located about 1.75 kilometres (1.09 mi) north of the present church site. The stave church was a long church with a rectangular nave and a somewhat narrower choir extension. The church was oriented with the choir to the east. Both the nave and the choir had a raised central space with a tower on the roof above. The church was surrounded by an open-air corridor. Around 1700, the corridor was removed.

In 1780, the old church was torn down and replaced with a new timber-framed cruciform church building on the same site. The new church was consecrated on 9 November 1780. Over the years, this church became too small for the congregation, plus there was no room for the expansion of the graveyard. The ground was also rather steep and wet. In 1848, permission was sought to build a new church in a new location. On 3 April 1856, permission was finally granted to build a new church on a new site about 1.75 kilometres (1.09 mi) to the south.

Christian Heinrich Grosch was hired to make designs for the new wooden octagonal church. The lead builders were Knut Hovihaugen and Erik Kleiven. Wood for the church was cut in the autumn and winter of 1855–1856. Construction began in 1856 and continued until the autumn of 1857. In 1857, the new building was consecrated by the Provost Aabel who was the acting Bishop at that time. The nave is an octagon shape with a church porch extension on the west side and a choir and sacristy extension on the east side. The old church was torn down in 1857 after the new building was completed.

== Media gallery ==
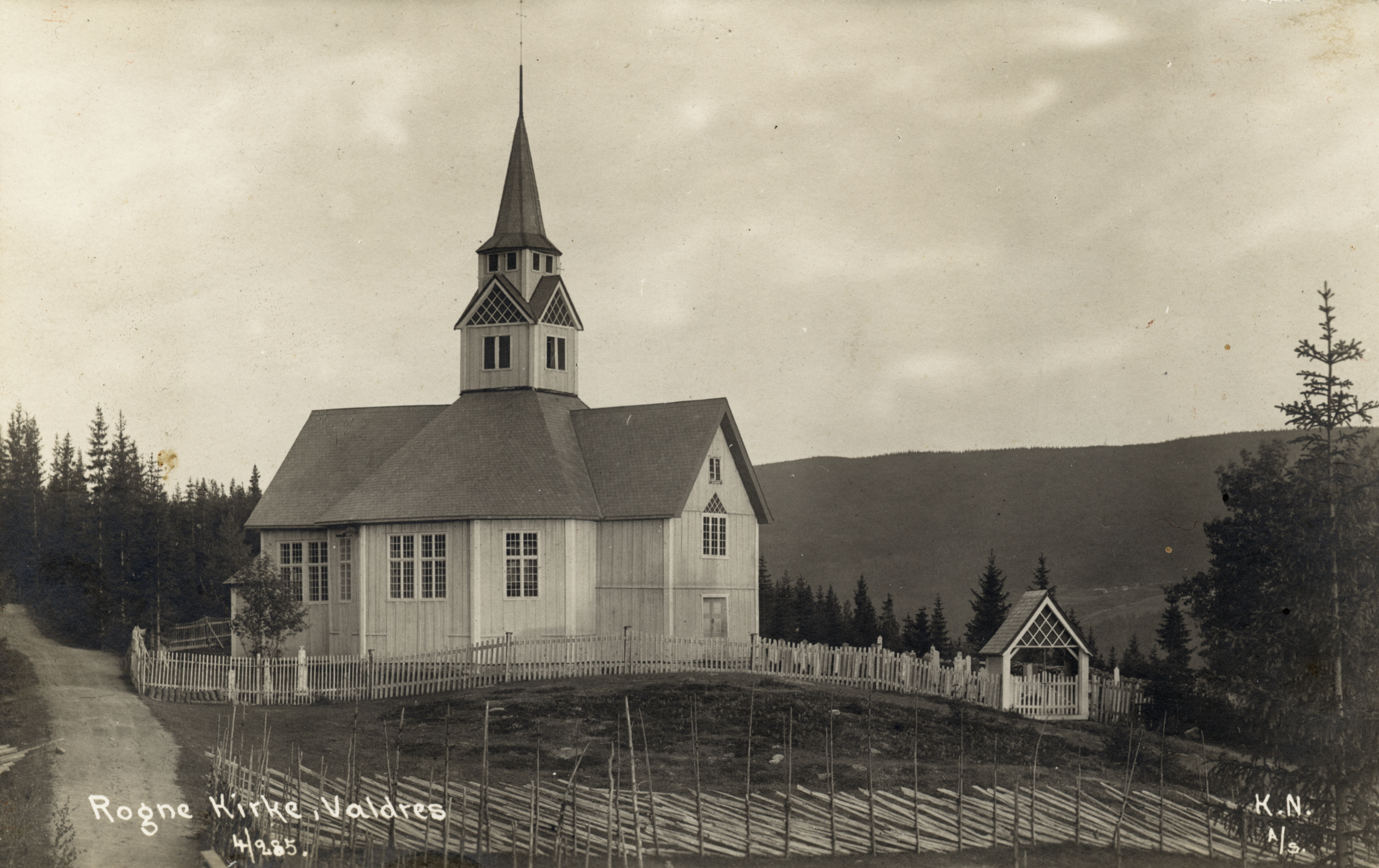

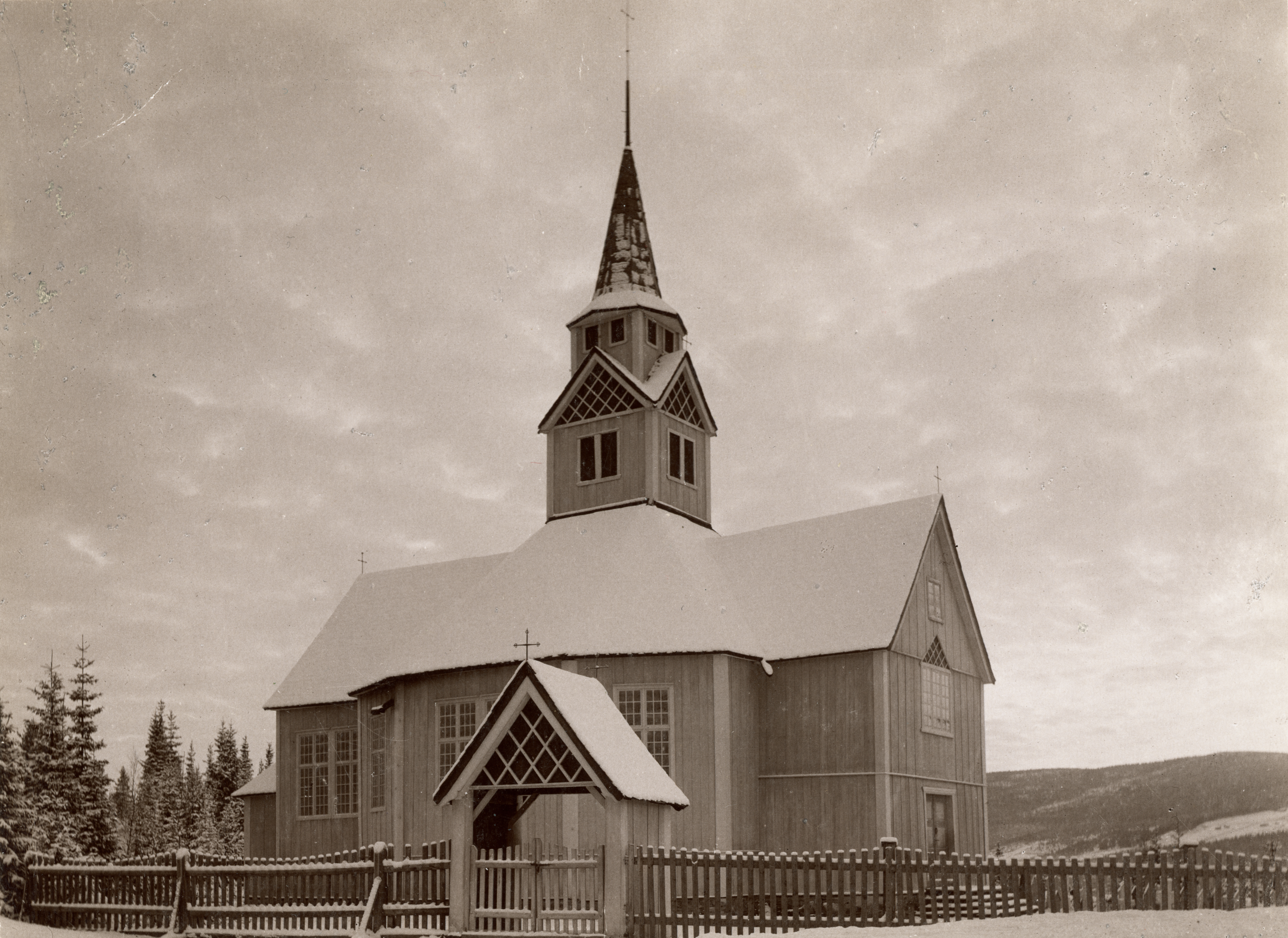

== See also ==
- List of churches in Hamar
