= Heggenes =

Village in Øystre Slidre Municipality, Norway

- Village
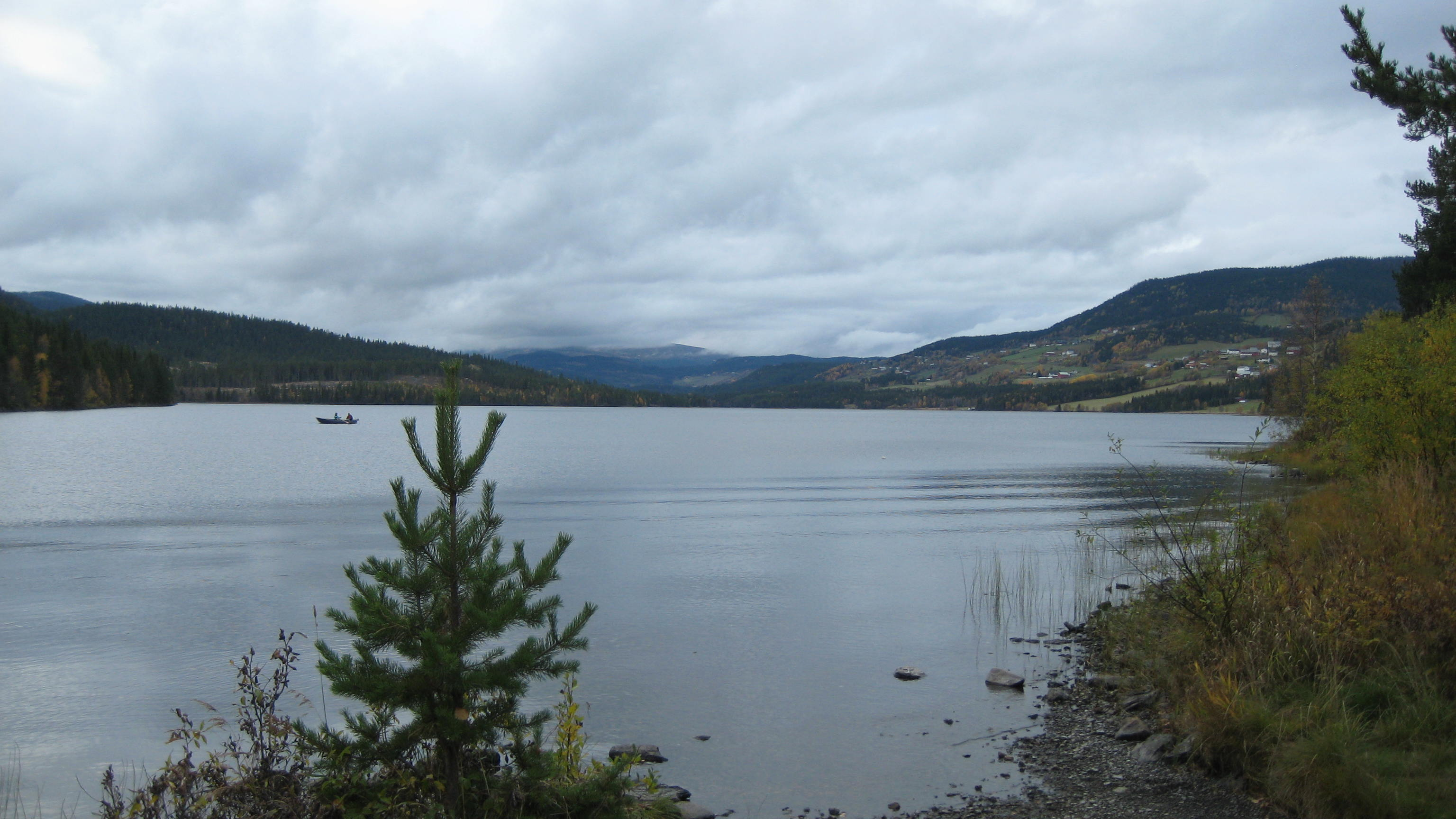
- View of the village (right side of picture)
- Interactive map of Heggenes
- Location within Innlandet Location within Norway
- Coordinates: 61.14379°N 9.06939°E
- Country: Norway
- Region: Eastern Norway
- County: Innlandet
- District: Valdres
- Municipality: Øystre Slidre Municipality

Area
  - Total: 0.46 km^{2} (0.18 sq mi)
- Elevation: 511 m (1,677 ft)

Population (2024)
  - Total: 314
  - Density: 683/km^{2} (1,770/sq mi)
- Time zone: UTC+01:00 (CET)
  - Summer (DST): UTC+02:00 (CEST)
- Post Code: 2940 Heggenes

Heggenes is the administrative centre of Øystre Slidre Municipality in Innlandet county, Norway. The village is located on the east shore of the lake Heggefjorden. The village of Hegge lies about 3 kilometres (1.9 mi) to the northwest, the village of Volbu lies about 3 kilometres (1.9 mi) to the south, and the village of Moane lies about 2.5 kilometres (1.6 mi) to the southeast. The Norwegian County Road 51 runs through the village.

The 0.46-square-kilometre (110-acre) village has a population (2024) of 314 and a population density of 683 inhabitants per square kilometre (1,770/sq mi).

== Climate ==
Climate data for Løken i Volbu 1991-2020 (521 m)
Month	Jan	Feb	Mar	Apr	May	Jun	Jul	Aug	Sep	Oct	Nov	Dec	Year
Mean daily maximum °C (°F)	−3.3 (26.1)	−1.8 (28.8)	2.9 (37.2)	7.5 (45.5)	12.6 (54.7)	17.1 (62.8)	19.7 (67.5)	17.9 (64.2)	13.4 (56.1)	6.2 (43.2)	0.6 (33.1)	−3.2 (26.2)	7.5 (45.5)
Daily mean °C (°F)	−7.2 (19.0)	−6.3 (20.7)	−2.3 (27.9)	2.5 (36.5)	7.3 (45.1)	11.8 (53.2)	14.4 (57.9)	12.8 (55.0)	8.6 (47.5)	2.6 (36.7)	−2.7 (27.1)	−6.8 (19.8)	2.9 (37.2)
Average precipitation mm (inches)	46 (1.8)	30 (1.2)	34 (1.3)	31 (1.2)	48 (1.9)	72 (2.8)	82 (3.2)	86 (3.4)	55 (2.2)	57 (2.2)	52 (2.0)	39 (1.5)	632 (24.7)
Source 1: Yr (precipitation)
Source 2: NOAA - WMO averages 91-2020 Norway
