= Rogne, Innlandet =

Village in Øystre Slidre Municipality, Norway

Rogne
- Village
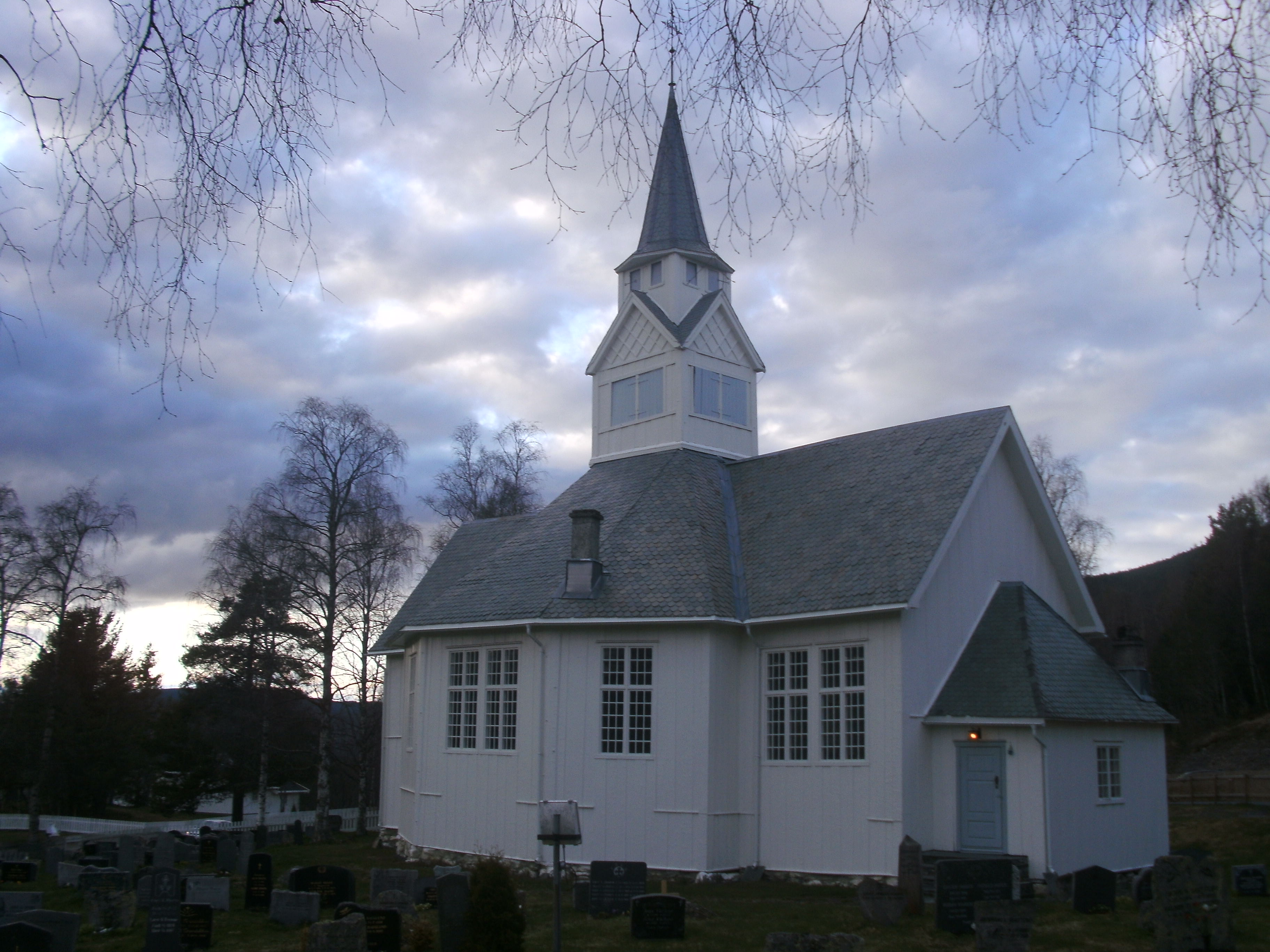
- View of the village church, Rogne Church
- Interactive map of Rogne
- Location within Innlandet Location within Norway
- Coordinates: 61.10161°N 9.11606°E
- Country: Norway
- Region: Eastern Norway
- County: Innlandet
- District: Valdres
- Municipality: Øystre Slidre Municipality
- Elevation: 529 m (1,736 ft)
- Time zone: UTC+01:00 (CET)
  - Summer (DST): UTC+02:00 (CEST)
- Post Code: 2943 Rogne

Rogne is a village in Øystre Slidre Municipality in Innlandet county, Norway. The village is located on the eastern shore of a large lake called the Volbufjorden, a short distance to the southeast of the villages of Heggenes, Moane, and Volbu. The village is the site of a local school as well as the Rogne Church.

Just east of Rogne is a large slate quarry, Valdres Skiferbrud, that has been operating for over 250 years. A sculpture memorial was built in Rogne by the sculptor Gunnar Rørhus for the purpose of honoring all the slate workers who have lived in the village over the centuries.

== Climate ==
Climate data for Løken i Volbu 1991-2020 (521 m)
Month	Jan	Feb	Mar	Apr	May	Jun	Jul	Aug	Sep	Oct	Nov	Dec	Year
Mean daily maximum °C (°F)	−3.3 (26.1)	−1.8 (28.8)	2.9 (37.2)	7.5 (45.5)	12.6 (54.7)	17.1 (62.8)	19.7 (67.5)	17.9 (64.2)	13.4 (56.1)	6.2 (43.2)	0.6 (33.1)	−3.2 (26.2)	7.5 (45.5)
Daily mean °C (°F)	−7.2 (19.0)	−6.3 (20.7)	−2.3 (27.9)	2.5 (36.5)	7.3 (45.1)	11.8 (53.2)	14.4 (57.9)	12.8 (55.0)	8.6 (47.5)	2.6 (36.7)	−2.7 (27.1)	−6.8 (19.8)	2.9 (37.2)
Average precipitation mm (inches)	46 (1.8)	30 (1.2)	34 (1.3)	31 (1.2)	48 (1.9)	72 (2.8)	82 (3.2)	86 (3.4)	55 (2.2)	57 (2.2)	52 (2.0)	39 (1.5)	632 (24.7)
Source 1: Yr (precipitation)
Source 2: NOAA - WMO averages 91-2020 Norway
