= Nord-Gudbrandsdal Deanery =

Deanery in the Church of Norway

Coordinates: 60°47′52″N 11°04′04″E

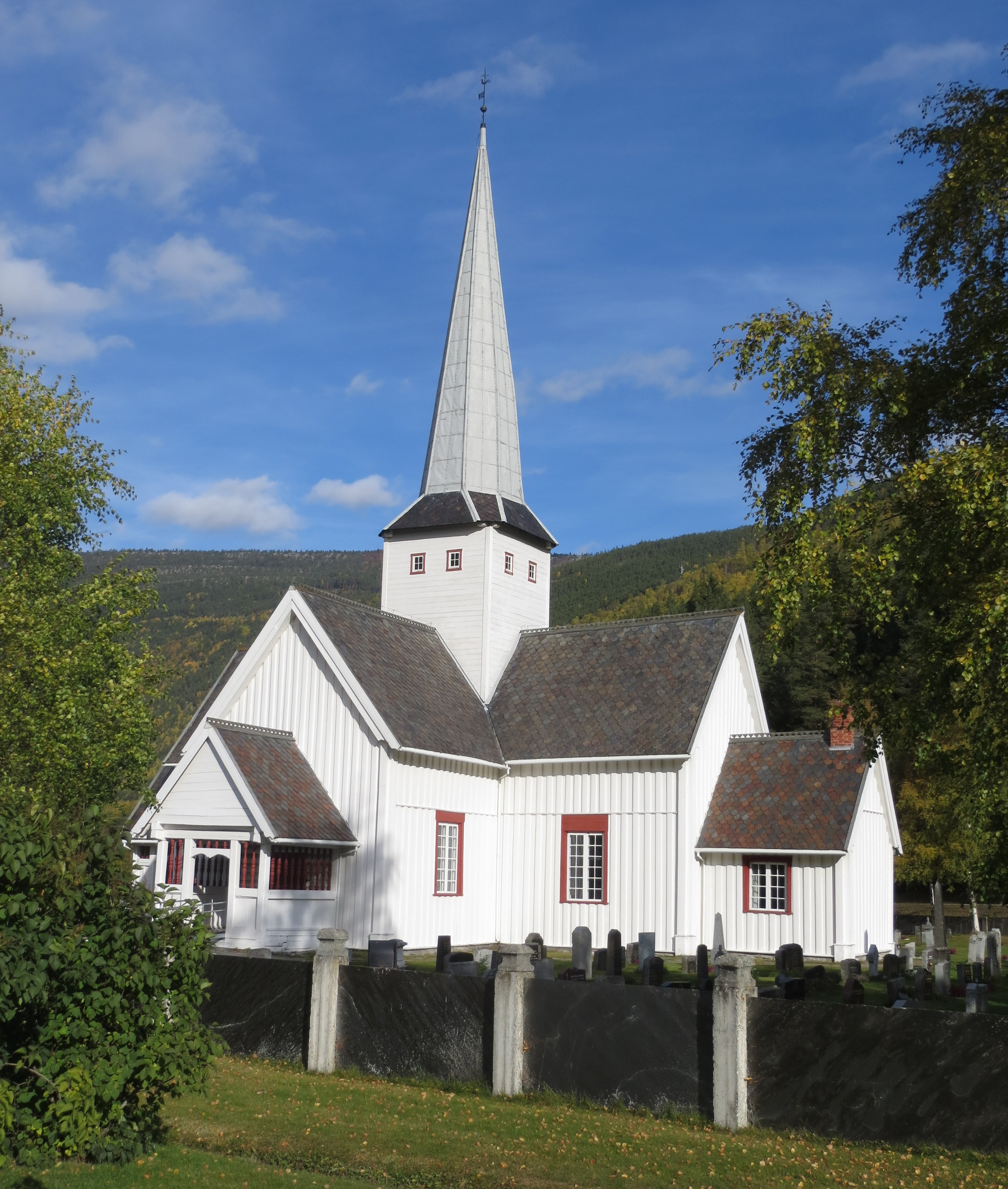
Sel Church is the church where the deanery leadership is based.

Nord-Gudbrandsdal Deanery is a deanery within the Diocese of Hamar in the Church of Norway. This deanery covers several municipalities in the northwestern part of the diocese. It includes churches in the municipalities of Dovre, Lesja, Lom, Nord-Fron, Sel, Skjåk, and Vågå. The deanery is headquartered at Sel Church in the north side of the town of Otta in Sel Municipality.

== History ==
On 18 March 1871, a government resolution was passed that divided the old Gudbrandsdalen prosti into two: Nordre Gudbrandsdalen prosti and Søndre Gudbrandsdalen prosti. This resolution went into effect on 1 May 1871. Originally, the new deanery included the churches in the parishes (prestegjeld) of Dovre, Lesja, Skjåk, Lom, and Vaage. In 1910, the parish of Vaage (later spelled Vågå) was split into two: Sel and Vaage. In 1922, the spelling of the name was changed from Nordre Gudbrandsdalen prosti to Nord-Gudbrandsdalen prosti (both mean "northern Gudbrandsdalen"). Also in that year, the parish of Sel was moved to the Midtre Gudbrandsdal prosti. A government resolution of 25 June 1971 ordered that the Midtre Gudbrandsdal prosti (deanery) was to be dissolved and the parishes of Sel Municipality and Fron Municipality were transferred into the Nord-Gudbrandsdal deanery starting on 1 January 1975. In 1977, the (newly reconstituted) municipality of Sør-Fron Municipality was transferred to Sør-Gudbrandsdal prosti. In 2004, the prestegjeld was dissolved within the Church of Norway in favor of linking all parishes in Norway to their municipalities.

== Locations ==
Map of the deanery

Each municipality is made up of one or more church parishes. Each municipality elects a church council to oversee the churches within the municipality.

Municipalities	Churches
Dovre	Dombås Church, Dovre Church, Eystein Church
Lesja	Lesja Church, Lesjaskog Church, Lesjaverk Church
Lom	Bøverdal Church, Garmo Stave Church, Lom Stave Church
Nord-Fron	Kvam Church, Kvikne Church, Skåbu Church, Sødorp Chapel, Sødorp Church
Sel	Heidal Church, Nord-Sel Church, Rossbu Chapel, Sel Church
Skjåk	Nordberg Church, Skjåk Church
Vågå	Vågå Church

== See also ==
- List of churches in Hamar#Nord-Gudbrandsdal prosti
