= Jotunheimvegen =

Toll road in Jotunheimen, Oppland, Norway

Coordinates: 61°32′N 9°25′E

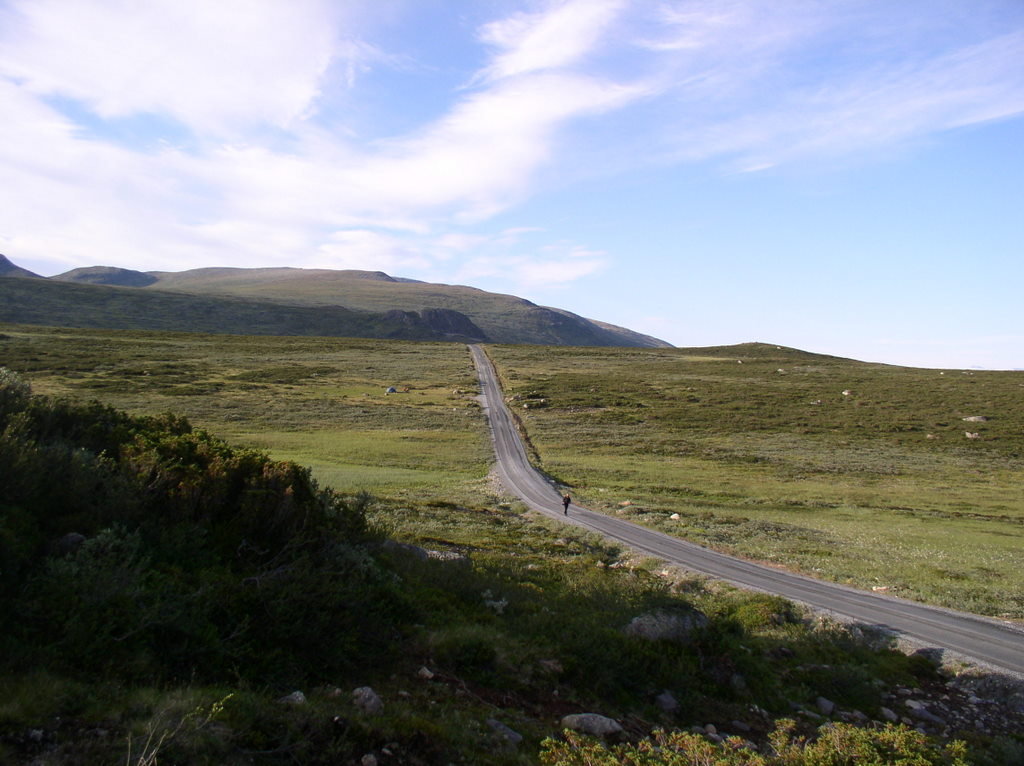

Route information
- Length: 45 km (28 mi)
- Restrictions: Summer only

Major junctions
- east end: Skåbu
- west end: RV51 near Bygdin

Jotunheimvegen is a 45-kilometre (28 mi) long toll road through Jotunheimen in Innlandet county in Norway. The gravel road runs is only open in the summer, from the end of June until it starts to snow, generally in October.

== Route ==
The road begins in Nord-Fron Municipality. It goes from Skåbu to Finnbolslia (this section is known as Slangslivegen) where it crosses the Flekka river. After the river crossing, the name changes to Jotunheimvegen. It crosses the mountain plateau to Øystre Slidre Municipality where it approximately follows the northern shores of the lakes Sandvatnet and Vinstri. The road crosses into Vang Municipality shortly before its terminus at the road RV 51 near where the lake Bygdin flows into Vinstri.

The ski resort of Beitostølen is approximately 10 kilometres (6.2 mi) from the western terminus. From the eastern terminus, on the opposite side of the Olstappen lake is the Peer Gynt tourist road to Lillehammer. Nearby is also the Ormtjernkampen National Park.

== History ==
Jotunheimvegen was constructed in the 1950s to replace a milk boat service which operated across Sandvatnet and Vinstri. The boat service became untenable due to the development of the lakes for hydroelectricity. The early formation of the road had to cross boggy areas and was laid on birch branches to prevent the construction vehicles from sinking. This made the road expensive to maintain and by 1987, after continual weather damage, the road needed reconstruction. With the support of private finance, toll income, and a grant from the Nord-Fron Municipality, it was brought up to a good standard at a cost of 10 million kr. It is maintained by toll income, as of 2024 the toll for a single journey by car was 120 kr.
