= Øyangen =

Øyangen may refer to:

== Places ==
- Øyangen (Valdres), a lake in Innlandet county, Norway
- Øyangen (Gran), a lake in Innlandet and Akershus counties, Norway
- Øyangen (Nord-Fron), a lake in Innlandet county, Norway
- Øyangen (Ringerike), a lake in Buskerud county, Norway

== People ==
- Gunhild Elise Øyangen (born 1947), a Norwegian politician
