= Fefor =

Village in Nord-Fron Municipality, Norway

- Village
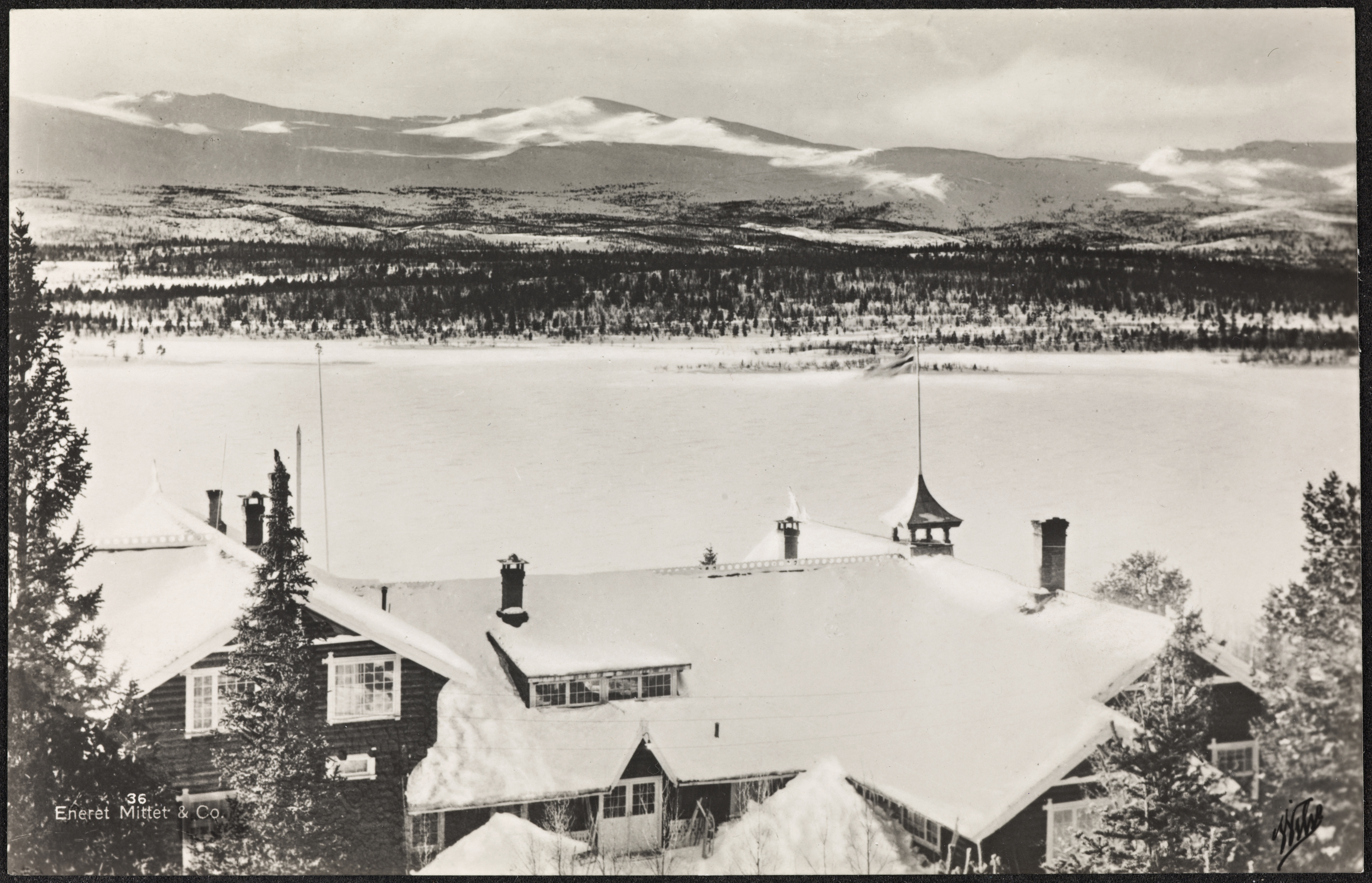
- View of the Fefor høyfjellshotell in 1924
- Interactive map of Fefor
- Location within Innlandet Location within Norway
- Coordinates: 61.53333°N 9.65°E
- Country: Norway
- Region: Eastern Norway
- County: Innlandet
- District: Gudbrandsdal
- Municipality: Nord-Fron Municipality
- Elevation: 883 m (2,897 ft)
- Time zone: UTC+01:00 (CET)
  - Summer (DST): UTC+02:00 (CEST)
- Post Code: 2640 Vinstra

Fefor is a mountain village in Nord-Fron Municipality in Innlandet county, Norway. The village is located on the hillside overlooking the lake Feforvatnet, about 10 kilometres (6.2 mi) south of the town of Vinstra.

The Fefor Mountain Hotel (Fefor høyfjellshotell) is a ski resort located in the village. It has a number of ski lifts. There are also some holiday homes in the village.

In 2025 the World Highland Games Championships were held in Fefor and the women's event was won by Eve Robson, the first English woman to do so.
