= Olstappen =

Lake in Innlandet, Norway

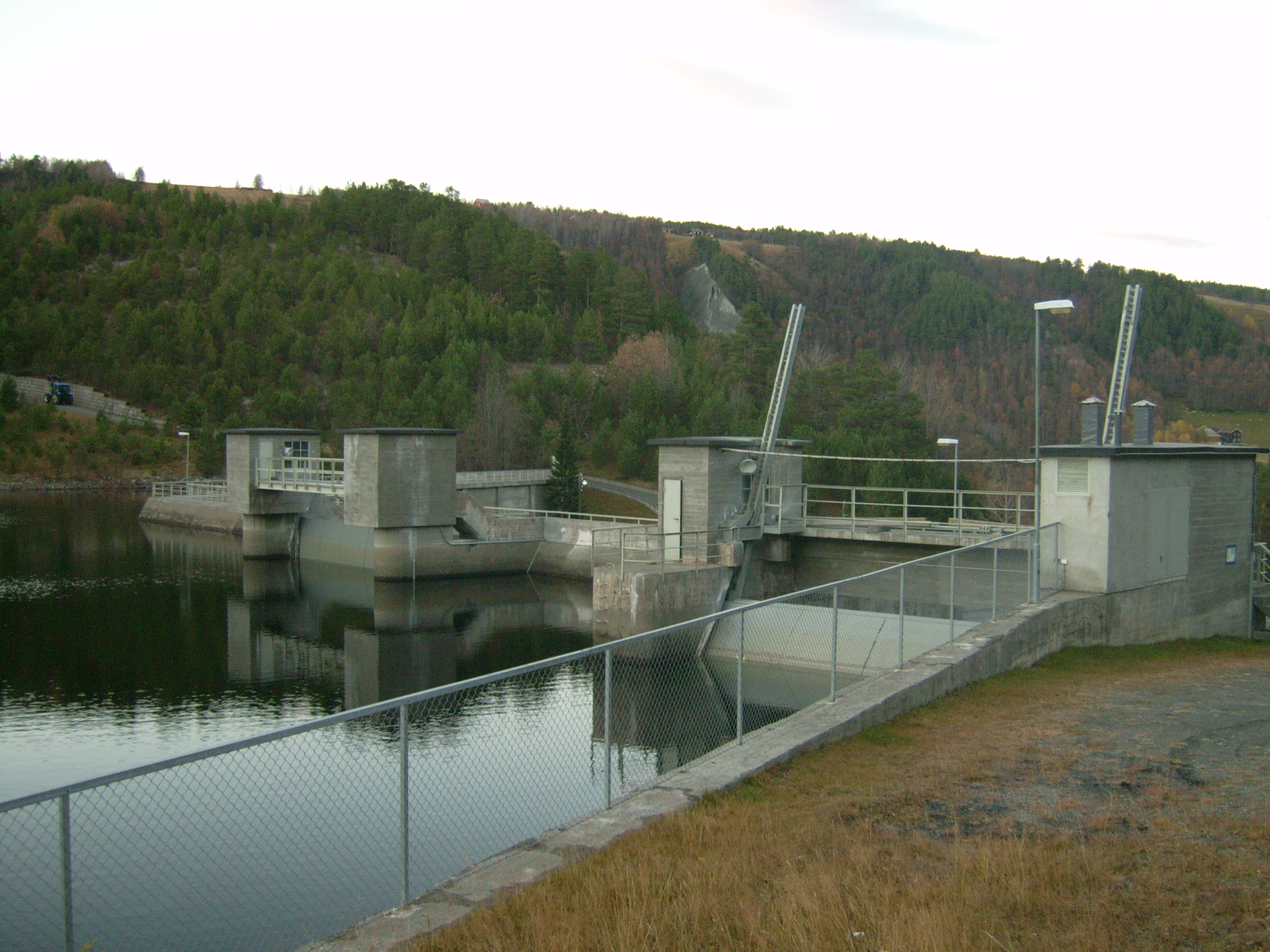
- Interactive map of the lake
- Location: Nord-Fron Municipality, Innlandet
- Coordinates: 61.47863°N 9.38264°E
- Primary inflows: Vinstra River, Espa River
- Primary outflows: Vinstra River
- Basin countries: Norway
- Max. length: 5 kilometres (3.1 mi)
- Max. width: 1.2 kilometres (0.75 mi)
- Surface area: 3.15 km^{2} (1.22 sq mi)
- Shore length^{1}: 13.88 kilometres (8.62 mi)
- Surface elevation: 662 metres (2,172 ft)
- References: NVE
- ^{1} Shore length is not a well-defined measure.

Olstappen is a lake in Nord-Fron Municipality in Innlandet county, Norway. The southeastern shore of the lake forms the municipal border with Sør-Fron Municipality. The 3.15-square-kilometre (1.22 sq mi) lies about 2 kilometres (1.2 mi) south of the village of Skåbu.

The Vinstra river, coming from the southwest, flows into the west side of Olstappen and flows out of Olstappen's northeast corner, and from there it heads east into the Gudbrandsdalslågen river at the town of Vinstra. The Espa River flows into Olstappen from the south, making it a tributary of the Vinstra.

== See also ==
- List of lakes in Norway
