= Øyangen (Nord-Fron) =

Lake in Innlandet, Norway

- Interactive map of the lake
- Location: Nord-Fron Municipality, Innlandet
- Coordinates: 61.41342°N 9.23801°E
- Basin countries: Norway
- Max. length: 3.5 kilometres (2.2 mi)
- Max. width: 2.1 kilometres (1.3 mi)
- Surface area: 4.25 km^{2} (1.64 sq mi)
- Shore length^{1}: 16.36 kilometres (10.17 mi)
- Surface elevation: 998 metres (3,274 ft)
- References: NVE
- ^{1} Shore length is not a well-defined measure.

Øyangen is a lake in Nord-Fron Municipality in Innlandet county, Norway. The 4.25-square-kilometre (1.64 sq mi) lake lies about 15 kilometres (9.3 mi) to the southwest of the village of Skåbu, and it is about 7 kilometres (4.3 mi) north of the Langsua National Park.

== See also ==
- List of lakes in Norway
