= Feforvatnet =

Lake in Innlandet, Norway

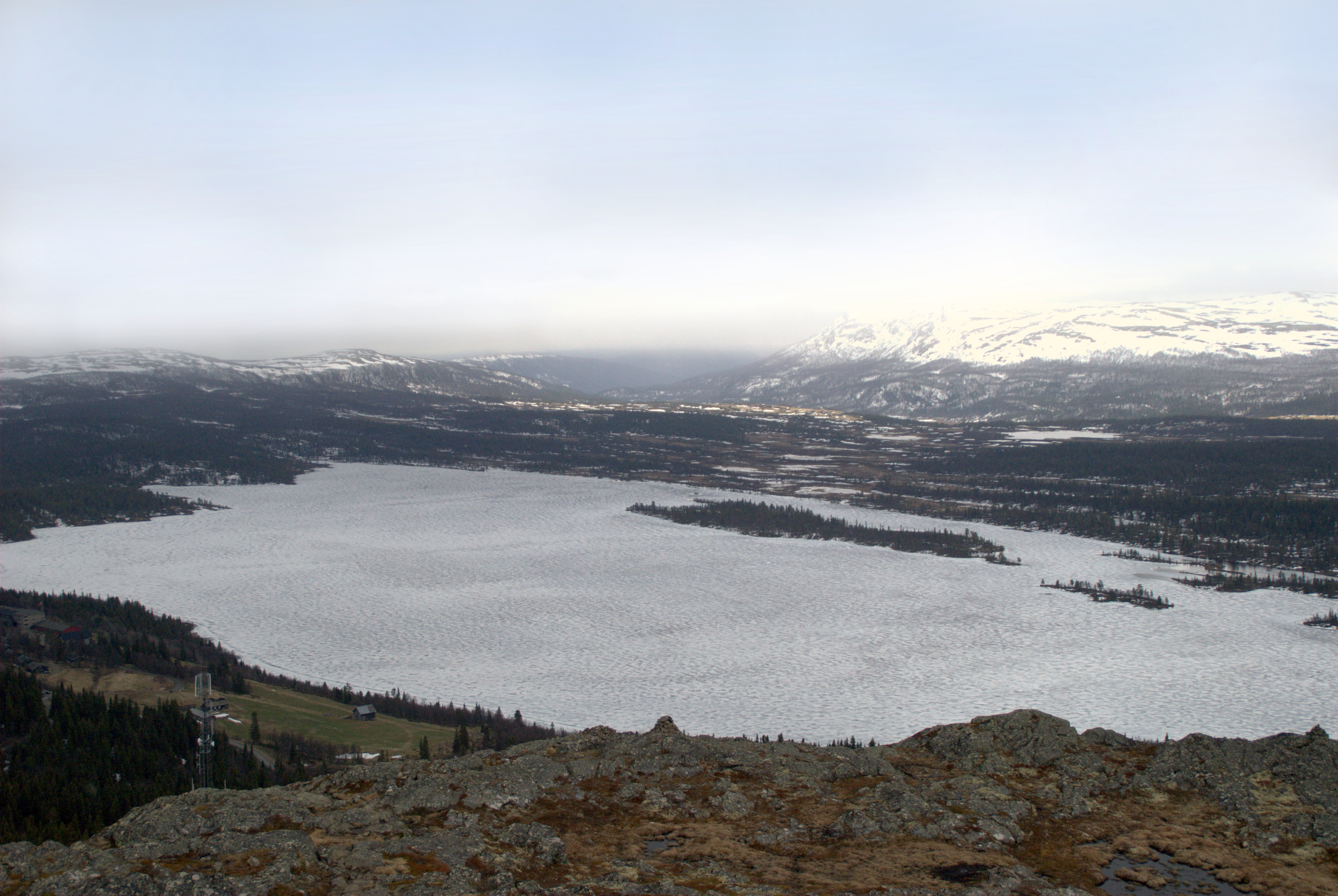
- Interactive map of the lake
- Location: Nord-Fron Municipality, Innlandet
- Coordinates: 61.52793°N 9.65134°E
- Basin countries: Norway
- Max. length: 3.5 kilometres (2.2 mi)
- Max. width: 1.3 kilometres (0.81 mi)
- Surface area: 2.77 km^{2} (1.07 sq mi)
- Shore length^{1}: 11.95 kilometres (7.43 mi)
- Surface elevation: 882 metres (2,894 ft)
- References: NVE
- ^{1} Shore length is not a well-defined measure.

Feforvatnet is a lake in Nord-Fron Municipality in Innlandet county, Norway. The 2.77-square-kilometre (1.07 sq mi) lake lies about 10 kilometres (6.2 mi) southwest of the town of Vinstra.

== See also ==
- List of lakes in Norway
