= Vinstervatna =

Lake in Innlandet, Norway

- Sandvatnet / Kaldfjorden / Øyvatnet
- Interactive map of the lake
- Location: Innlandet
- Coordinates: 61.36321°N 9.18727°E
- Basin countries: Norway
- Max. length: 10 kilometres (6.2 mi)
- Max. width: 5 kilometres (3.1 mi)
- Surface area: 19.18 km^{2} (7.41 sq mi)
- Surface elevation: 1,019 metres (3,343 ft)
- References: NVE

Vinstervatna (parts of the lake are known as: Sandvatnet, Kaldfjorden, or Øyvatnet) is a man-made reservoir in Innlandet county, Norway. The 19.18-square-kilometre (7.41 sq mi) lake is rather unique because it was created after a hydroelectric dam was built. After completion of the dam, the river flooded and several smaller lakes rose and became connected as one large lake. The lake lies on the border of Nord-Fron Municipality, Sør-Fron Municipality and Øystre Slidre Municipality.

Water enters from the nearby lake Vinstre to the west. The lake sits at an elevation of 1,019 metres (3,343 ft) above sea level. The lake is located about 40 kilometres (25 mi) southwest of the town of Vinstra and about 20 kilometres (12 mi) northeast of the village of Beitostølen. The lake marks the northwestern boundary of Langsua National Park.

== Names ==
Since the completion of the dam and the flooding of the area, the new lake has been referred to as Vinstervatna, after the nearby lake Vinstre which flows into this lake. Several parts of the large lake are still referred to by different names: Sandvatnet is the western part, Kaldfjorden is the central portion, and Øyvatnet is the eastern part (referencing the old names of the old, smaller lakes that once were located in those areas). Kaldfjorden was the largest of the old lakes and the present lake in its entirety is also sometimes known as Kaldfjorden.

== See also ==
- List of lakes in Norway
