= Ole Paulssøn Haagenstad =

Norwegian farmer and politician

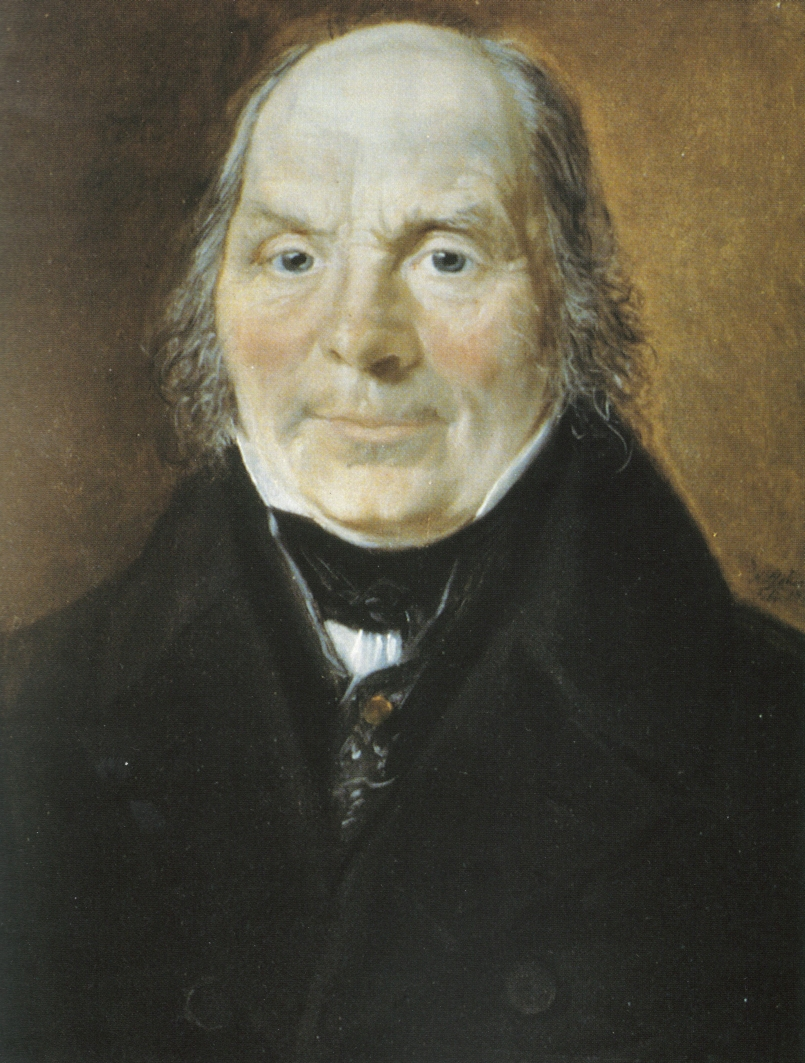
Ole Paulssøn Haagenstad

Ole Paulssøn Haagenstad (17 October 1775 – 16 April 1866) was a Norwegian farmer and politician.

Haagenstad was born at the Harildstad farm in the parish of Fron (now part of Nord-Fron Municipality) in Oppland, Norway.

He was elected to the Norwegian Parliament in 1814, 1815, 1818, 1824, 1827, 1833, 1836, 1839 and 1842, representing the rural constituency of Christians Amt.
