= Eve Robson =

English heavy athlete

- In the hammer cage - Killin Highland Games 2026

Personal information
- National team: England
- Home town: Hurworth-on-Tees
- Education: Middlesbrough College
- Occupation: Highland Games competitor
- Years active: 2022 - present

Sport
- Sport: Highland Games; heavy athletics
- Coached by: David Dowson

Achievements and titles
- World finals: World Highland Games Championships 2025 (first) World Highland Games Championships 2026 (second) European Highland Games Championships 2026 (first)

Eve Robson is a British heavy athlete and Highland Games competitor. She won the International World Highland Games Federation (IHGF) Amateur World Highland Games Championships held in Fefor, Norway in 2025 and was the first English woman to do so. The same year Robson came joint second in the first World Female Heavy Events Championship with the American athlete, Gabriella Rinehart, at Glen Urquhart Highland Gathering and Games. In 2026 she won the European Highland Games Championships in Bressuire, France and the St.Andrews, Killin, Inverkeithing, Pitlochry, Bowhill and Cowal Ladies Highland Games, Scotland. Recently Robson came second in the 2026 World Female Heavy Events Championship at Glen Urquhart Highland Gathering and Games.

Originally from Hurworth-on-Tees, England, Robson took up the sport in 2022, becoming Scottish champion in 2023. The same year she came second in the World Highland Games Championships, beaten by American athlete Amber Tiedeman. Robson's coach is David Dowson, a former Highland Games competitor; she has been training with him in athletic throwing events since she was 14 years old.

Educated at Middlesbrough College, to raise money to travel for competitions, Robson has arm-wrestled customers in the pub where she worked.
