= Peder Per Veggum =

Norwegian artist (1768–1836)

Peder Per Veggum (11 April 1768 – 15 April 1836) was a Norwegian artist associated with the decorative folk art of Rosemaling. He was primarily known as a skilled and prolific rose painter (norsk rosemaler), but he was also a cabinet carpenter and woodcarver.

Veggum was born on a farm in the prestegjeld of Fron in Oppland county, Norway (in what is now Nord-Fron Municipality). He was the son of Ole Olsen Leine (1726-1801) and Lisbet Nilsdatter Bjorge (1736-1813). He grew up in Vågå Municipality and apprenticed at Røros in Søndre Trondhjem county. From 1797, he settled at Sel in the traditional region of Gudbrandsdalen, where he practiced cabinetmaking, wood carvings, and floral paintings. He made and decorated cabinets, pantry, chests, and boxes.

== Related reading ==
- Blanck, Helen Elizabeth (1975) Rosemaling: the beautiful Norwegian art (Saint Paul, MN: Woodland Park Fine Arts) ISBN 978-1932043082
- Edwards, Sybil (1994) Decorative folk art: exciting techniques to transform everyday objects (London: David & Charles) ISBN 978-0715307847
- Miller, Margaret M.; Sigmund Aarseth (1974) Norwegian rosemaling : decorative painting on wood (New York City: Scribners) ISBN 978-0684167435
- Ellingsgard, Nils (1999) Norsk rosemåling – Dekorativ måling i folkekunsten (Oslo, Det norske samlaget) ISBN 82-521-5522-7
