= Kvam, Innlandet =

Village in Nord-Fron Municipality, Norway

Kvam
- Village
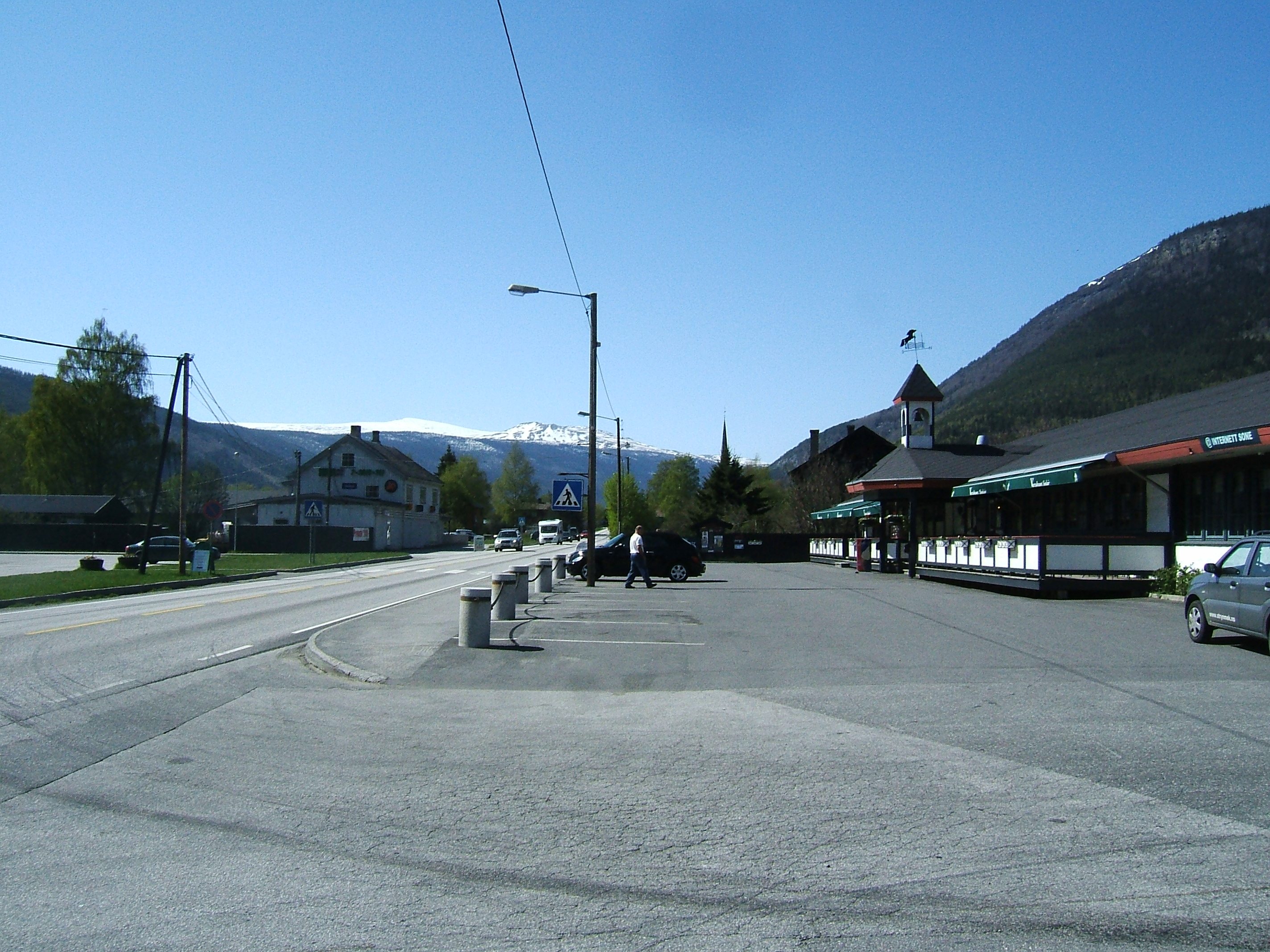
- View of the village
- Interactive map of Kvam
- Location within Innlandet Location within Norway
- Coordinates: 61.665°N 9.68773°E
- Country: Norway
- Region: Eastern Norway
- County: Innlandet
- District: Gudbrandsdalen
- Municipality: Nord-Fron Municipality

Area
  - Total: 1.26 km^{2} (0.49 sq mi)
- Elevation: 262 m (860 ft)

Population (2024)
  - Total: 750
  - Density: 595/km^{2} (1,540/sq mi)
- Time zone: UTC+01:00 (CET)
  - Summer (DST): UTC+02:00 (CEST)
- Post Code: 2642 Kvam

Kvam is a village in Nord-Fron Municipality in Innlandet county, Norway. The village is located in the Gudbrandsdalen valley, along the river Gudbrandsdalslågen, about 10 kilometres (6.2 mi) northwest of the town of Vinstra. The European route E6 highway and the Dovrebanen railway line both run through the village. The railroad stops at the Kvam Station. The 1.26-square-kilometre (310-acre) village has a population (2024) of 750 and a population density of 595 inhabitants per square kilometre (1,540/sq mi).

== History ==
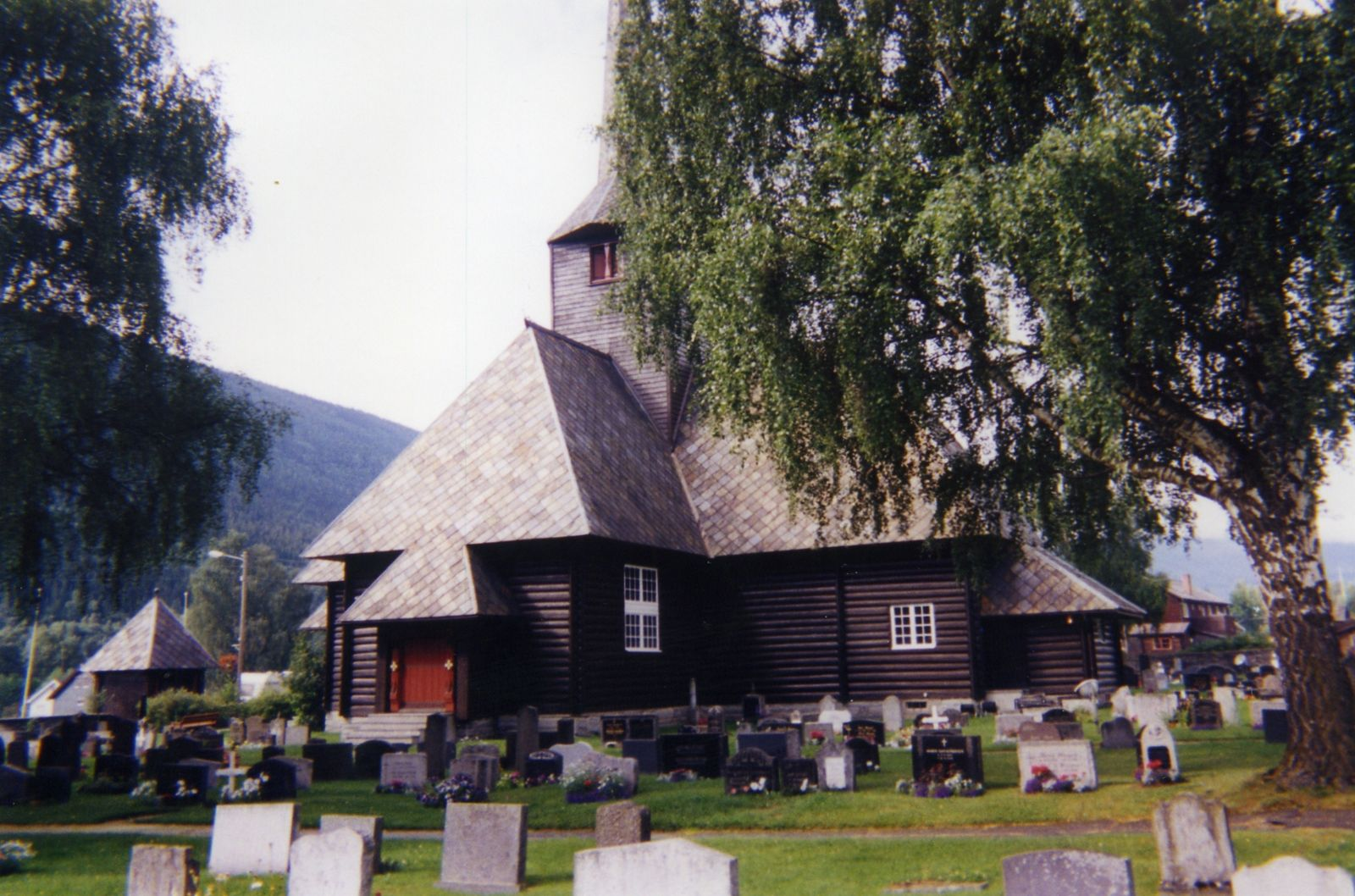
Kvam Church (Nord-Fron) with graveyard

During the military campaign in Norway in 1940, Kvam was the scene of a battle between German and British forces. During the battle, the original Kvam Church that was built in 1776 was destroyed by the Germans. In 1952, after the war, the current Kvam Church was constructed on the same site. Kvam has a British military cemetery.

The village experienced devastating floods in 2011 and 2013.
