= Skåbu Church =

Church in Innlandet, Norway

- Skåbu kyrkje
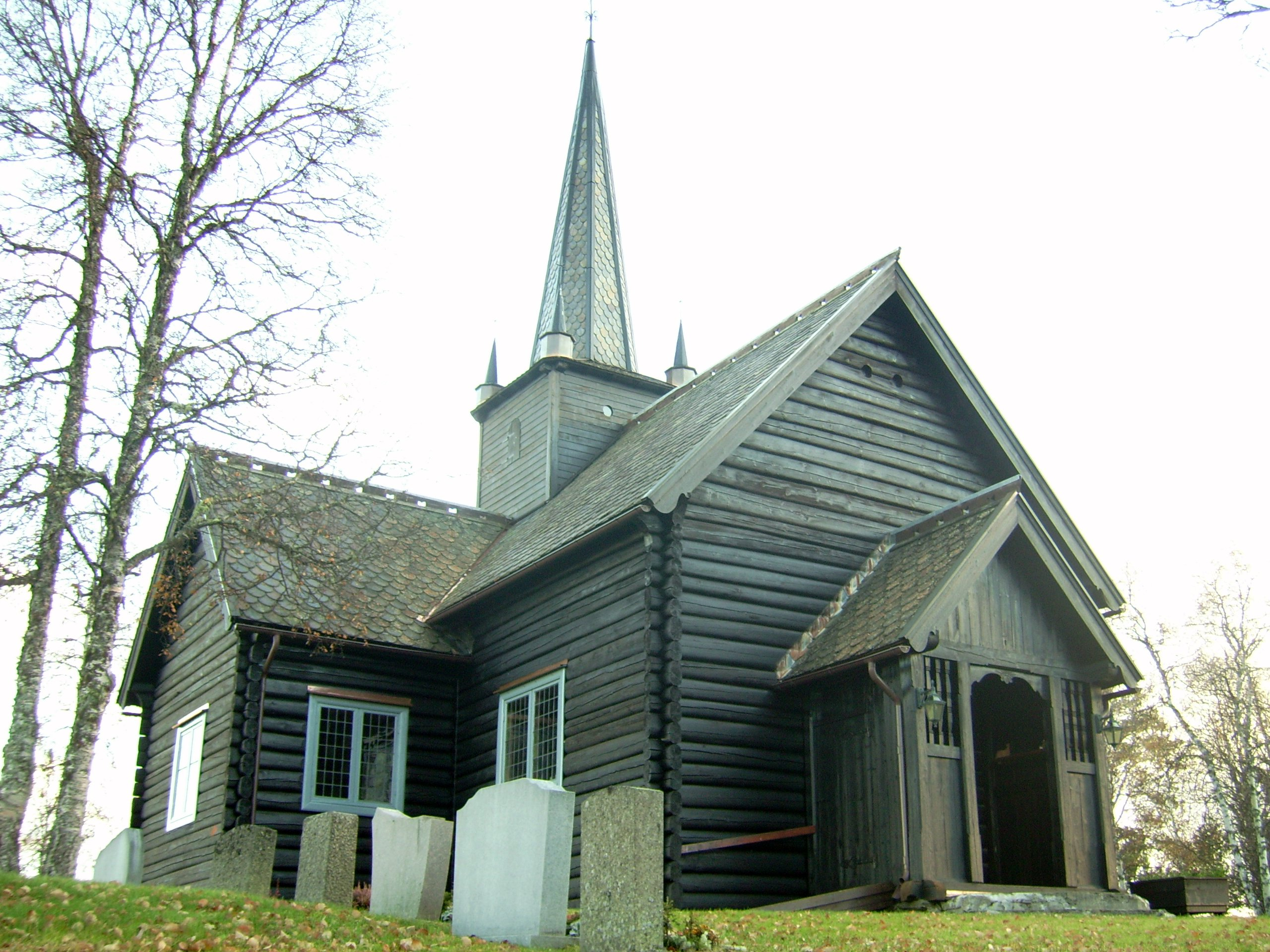
- View of the church
- Skåbu Church
- 61°31′43″N 9°24′58″E
- Location: Nord-Fron, Innlandet
- Country: Norway
- Denomination: Church of Norway
- Churchmanship: Evangelical Lutheran

History
- Status: Parish church
- Founded: 1927
- Consecrated: 1927

Architecture
- Functional status: Active
- Architect: Knut Villa
- Architectural type: Cruciform
- Completed: 1927 (99 years ago)

Specifications
- Capacity: 160
- Materials: Wood

Administration
- Diocese: Hamar bispedømme
- Deanery: Nord-Gudbrandsdal prosti
- Parish: Skåbu
- Norwegian Cultural Heritage Site
- Type: Church
- Status: Protected
- ID: 85486

Skåbu Church (Norwegian: Skåbu kyrkje) is a parish church of the Church of Norway in Nord-Fron Municipality in Innlandet county, Norway. It is located in the village of Skåbu. It is the church for the Skåbu parish which is part of the Nord-Gudbrandsdal prosti (deanery) in the Diocese of Hamar. The brown, wooden church was built in a cruciform design in 1927 using plans drawn up by the architect Knut Villa. The church seats about 160 people.

== History ==
The first church in Skåbu was built during the 13th century, possibly the year 1235. The first church was likely a small, wooden stave church located about 4 kilometres (2.5 mi) northeast of the present church site. The earliest existing historical records of the church date back to the year 1590, but the church was old by that time. The church was likely closed during the 1600s and the people of the Skåbu area had to travel to the nearby Kvikne Church. In the early 1900s, the parish began considering a new church in Skåbu. The new church was designed by Knut Villa and it was a wooden cruciform building. It was completed in 1927.

== See also ==
- List of churches in Hamar
