= Sødorp Chapel =

Church in Innlandet, Norway

- Sødorp kapell
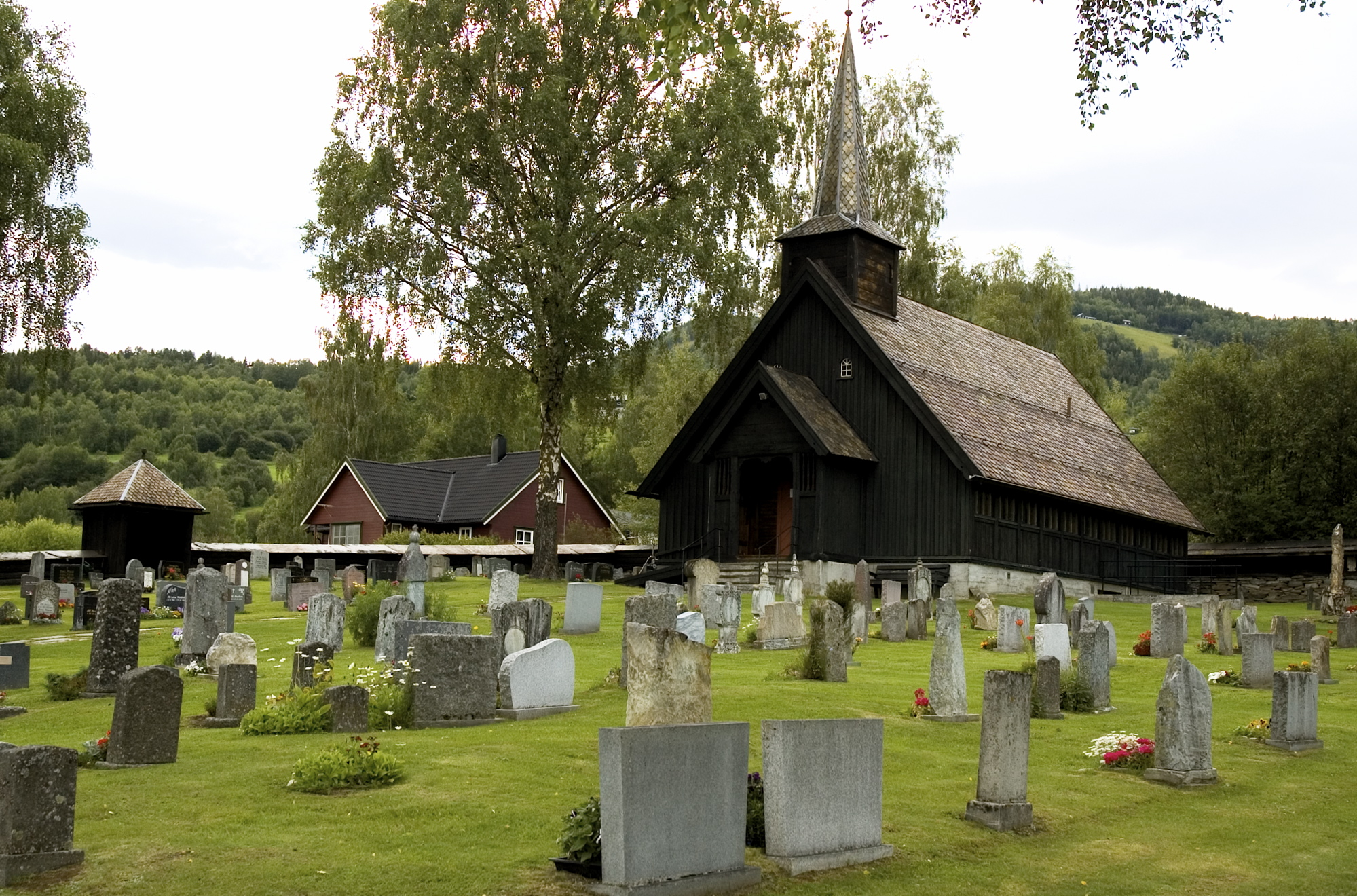
- View of the chapel
- Sødorp Chapel
- 61°35′20″N 9°46′53″E
- Location: Nord-Fron Municipality, Innlandet
- Country: Norway
- Denomination: Church of Norway
- Churchmanship: Evangelical Lutheran

History
- Status: Parish church
- Founded: 1929
- Consecrated: 1929

Architecture
- Functional status: Active
- Architect: Knut Villa
- Architectural type: Long church
- Completed: 1929 (97 years ago)

Specifications
- Capacity: 169
- Materials: Wood

Administration
- Diocese: Hamar bispedømme
- Deanery: Nord-Gudbrandsdal prosti
- Parish: Sødorp
- Norwegian Cultural Heritage Site
- Type: Church
- Status: Not protected
- ID: 85036

Sødorp Chapel (Norwegian: Sødorp kapell) is a chapel of the Church of Norway in Nord-Fron Municipality in Innlandet county, Norway. It is located in the town of Vinstra. It is an annex chapel for the Sødorp parish which is part of the Nord-Gudbrandsdal prosti (deanery) in the Diocese of Hamar. The brown, wooden chapel was built in a long church design in 1929 using plans drawn up by the architect Knut Villa. The chapel seats about 169 people.

== History ==
The old Sødorp Church was built on this site in 1752 and it stood on this site until 1908 when it was disassembled and moved to a site closer to the centre of the village of Vinstra. After the church was moved away, the local residents began thinking about building an annex chapel on the site to serve the eastern part of Vinstra. In the late 1920s, permission was granted and planning began. Knut Villa was hired to design the building. The chapel was built and financed by volunteers and donations. By the late 1960s, the chapel was too small and it was expanded from 1970 to 1972. The architect for this project was Trygve Kleiven, and after the expansion the chapel was re-consecrated by Bishop Alexander Lange Johnson on 29 August 1972. In 2009, the chapel was refurbished and expanded again, also using drawings by Trygve Kleiven. This brought the number of seats up to 169 as well as added a handicap-accessible bathroom. The renovation was completed and the church went back into use on 4 October 2009.

== See also ==
- List of churches in Hamar
