= Kvam Church (Nord-Fron) =

Church in Innlandet, Norway

- Kvam kirke
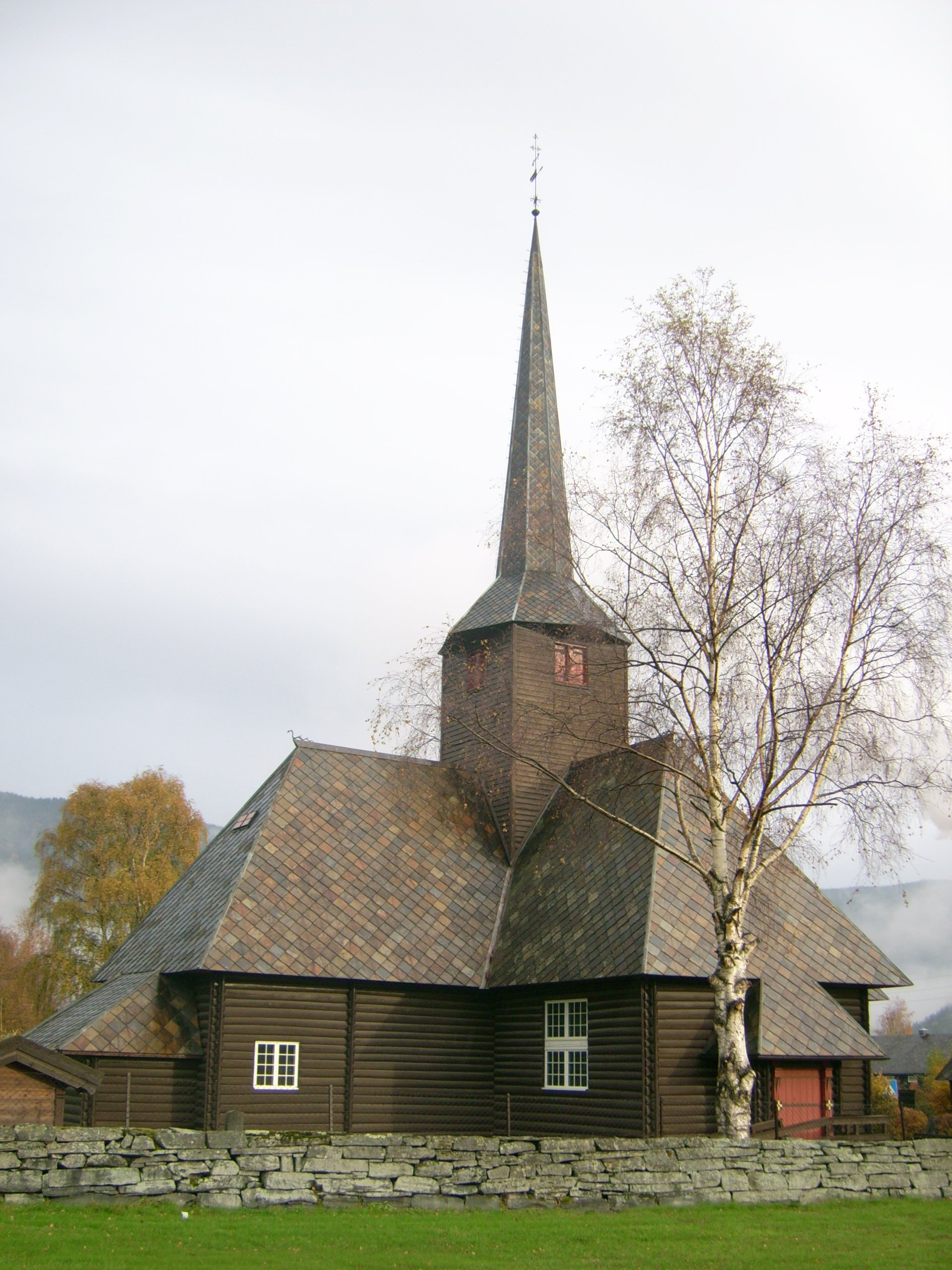
- View of the church
- Kvam Church
- 61°39′56″N 9°41′40″E
- Location: Nord-Fron, Innlandet
- Country: Norway
- Denomination: Church of Norway
- Previous denomination: Catholic Church
- Churchmanship: Evangelical Lutheran

History
- Status: Parish church
- Founded: 13th century
- Consecrated: 12 October 1952

Architecture
- Functional status: Active
- Architect: Magnus Poulsson
- Architectural type: Cruciform
- Completed: 1952 (74 years ago)

Specifications
- Capacity: 450
- Materials: Wood

Administration
- Diocese: Hamar bispedømme
- Deanery: Nord-Gudbrandsdal prosti
- Parish: Kvam
- Norwegian Cultural Heritage Site
- Type: Church
- Status: Not protected
- ID: 84854

Kvam Church (Norwegian: Kvam kirke) is a parish church of the Church of Norway in Nord-Fron Municipality in Innlandet county, Norway. It is located in the village of Kvam. It is the church for the Kvam parish which is part of the Nord-Gudbrandsdal prosti (deanery) in the Diocese of Hamar. The brown, wooden church was built in a cruciform design in 1952 using plans drawn up by the architect Magnus Poulsson. The church seats about 450 people. The church has a cemetery with a memorial to British soldiers that were killed in an engagement at the site in 1940.

== History ==
The first church at Kvam was a wooden stave church that was likely built in the 13th century. This church was located along the river Gudbrandsdalslågen at Vik, about 1.5 kilometres (0.93 mi) to the east of the present church site. Not much is known of the old stave church. Its exact location is unknown; however, it is likely that the current road and railway line runs over the church site because coffins were found during the excavation and construction of both.

By the mid-1700s, it was clear the church site needed to be moved. The land surrounding the church was wet and soft due to its proximity to the river and this made for problematic graveyard conditions at the church. In 1775, the king granted permission to build a new church at Røssumvollen below the Røssum farm, about 1.5 kilometres (0.93 mi) west of the old church site. The new site was in the central part of the growning village of Kvam rather than outside the village. The parish hired Per Korpberget to be the lead builder for the new church. The new building was a timber-framed cruciform building with a high vaulted ceiling. The new church had room for about 300 people (with a fairly similar design to the present church building). The new church was consecrated on 28 August 1778. After the new church was completed, the old church was torn down.

In 1938, a burial chapel was constructed near the church along the cemetery. The chapel was built using money that was a gift from Petra Sletten (who is buried in the cemetery). This new chapel was consecrated on 12 August 1938. By the 20th century, the church needed renovation. The tower was leaning, the floor had to be replaced, the benches were not good, and other issues. During the late-1930s, plans were drawn up to renovate the church. Funds were allocated in the winter of 1940, but World War II disrupted their plans and things were put on hold. On the evening of 26 April 1940, the church caught fire, presumably by a German grenade during some fighting between the German and British forces. The church burned to the ground along with all its interior furnishings. About 100 buildings in the village were damaged by the fire. The small burial chapel at the church survived the fire. All that remains of the old church is a small church bell, the spire, and a door.

Soon after the war ended in 1945, plans were made to rebuild a church in Kvam. The new church was designed by Magnus Poulsson and Anders Haverstad was hired as the lead builder. The new church was designed to be very similar to the previous wooden cruciform building that burned down, except that its orientation was changed so that the choir is on the north end of the building and the main entrance is along the main road. The church was completed in 1952 and consecrated on 12 October 1952. It was decorated with carvings by Edvard Bakkom, Mathias Fjerdingren, and Anders Johnsgard, and the decorative painting was done by Arve Hagen.

== Media gallery ==
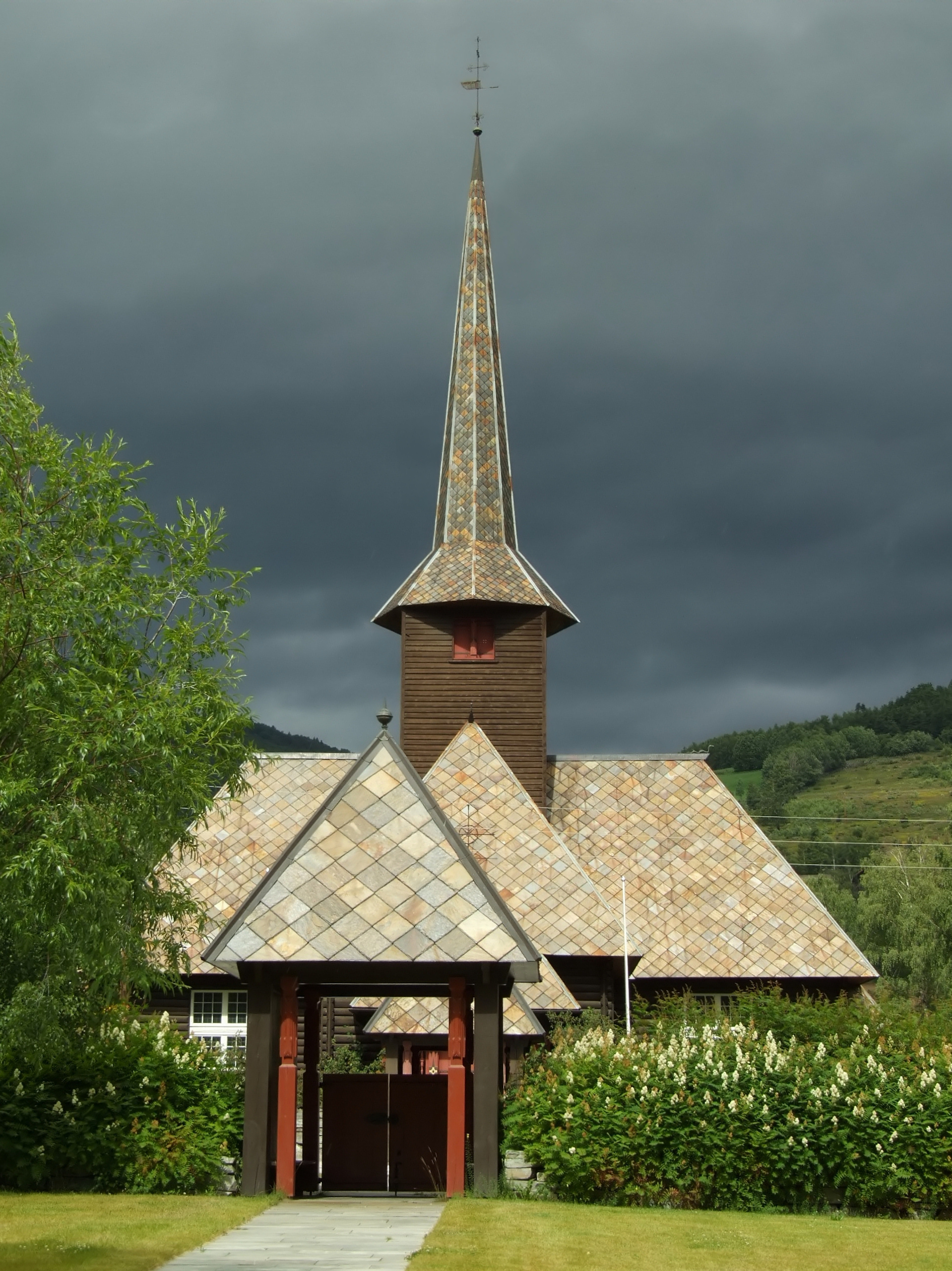

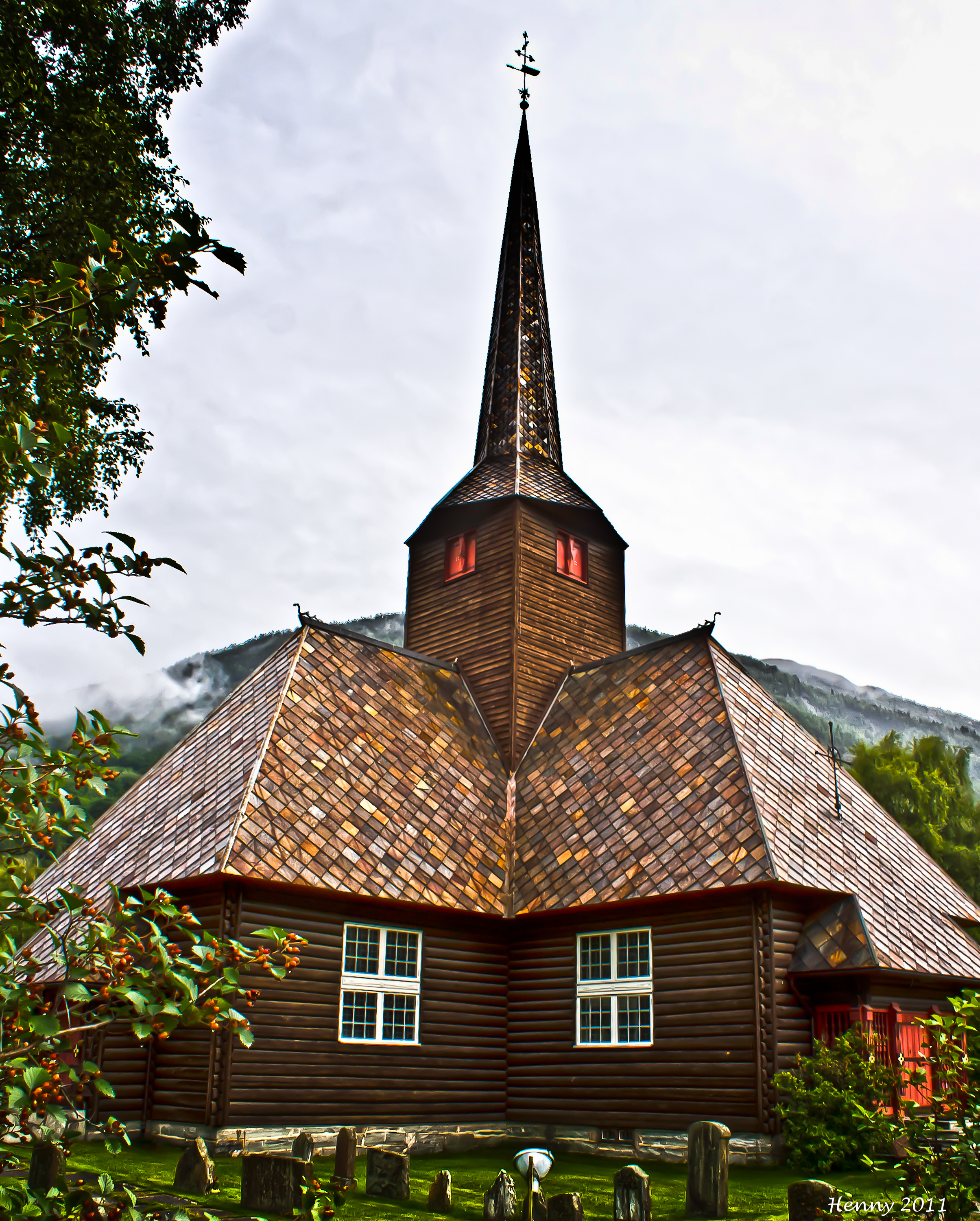

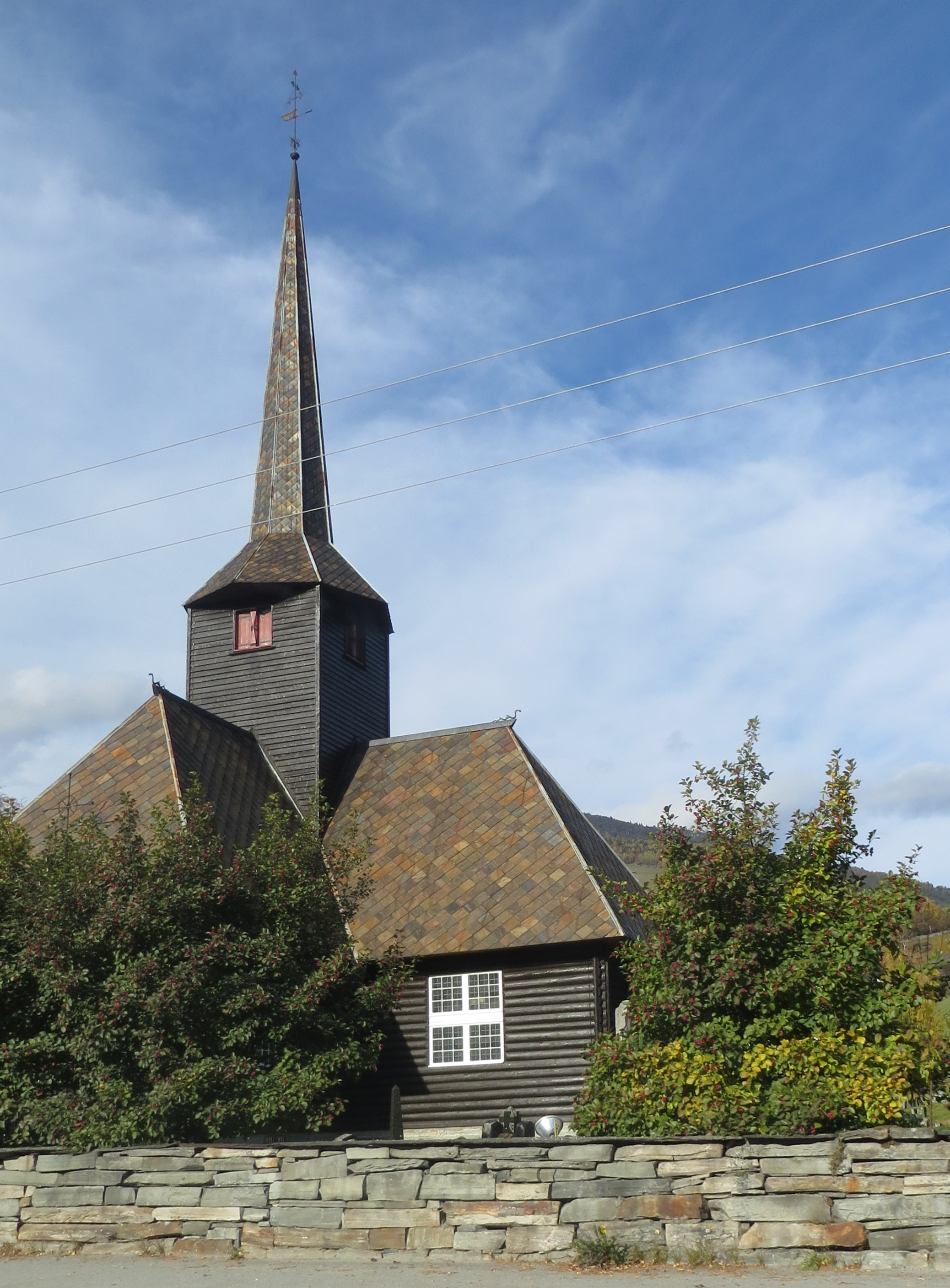

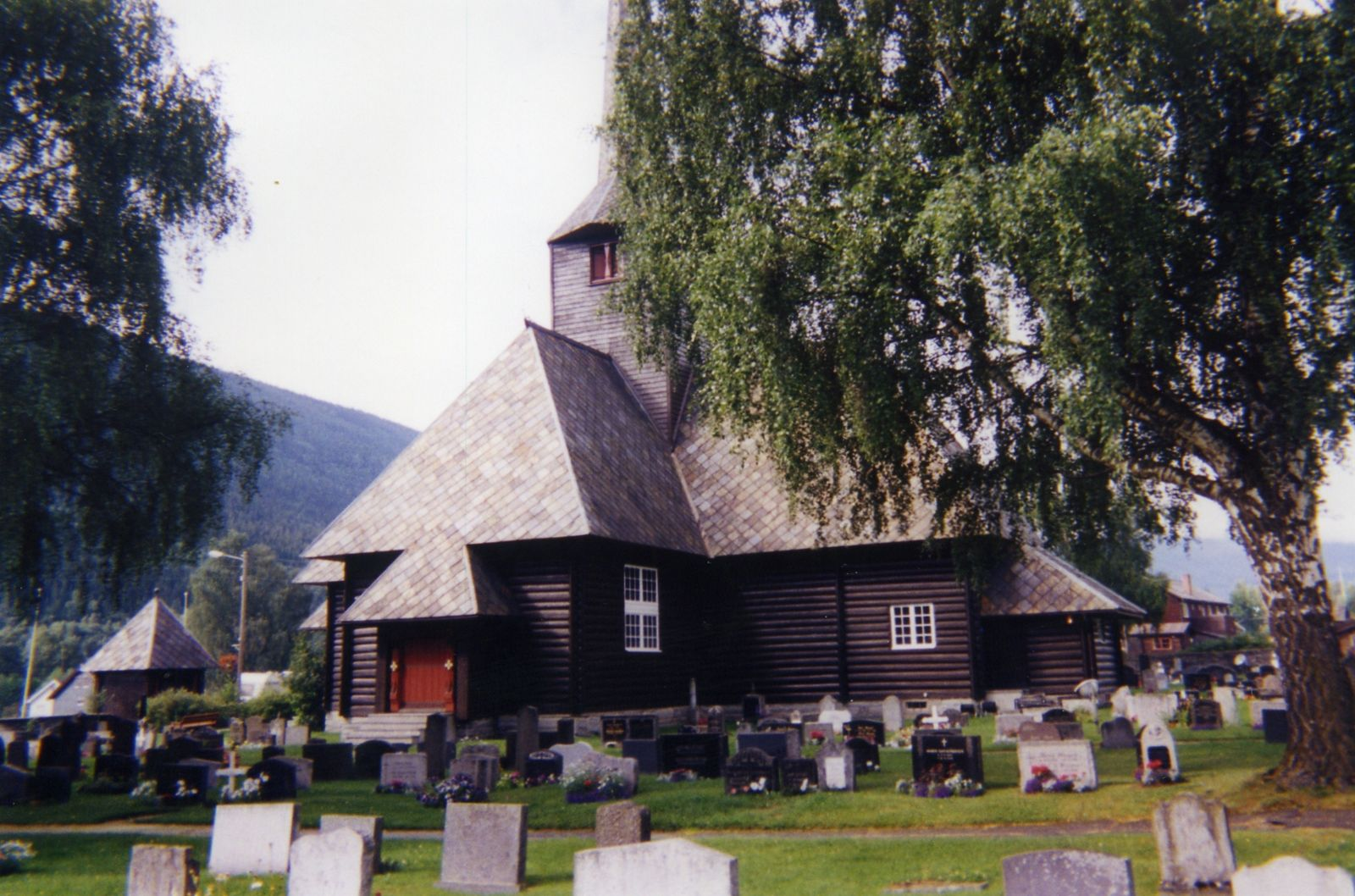

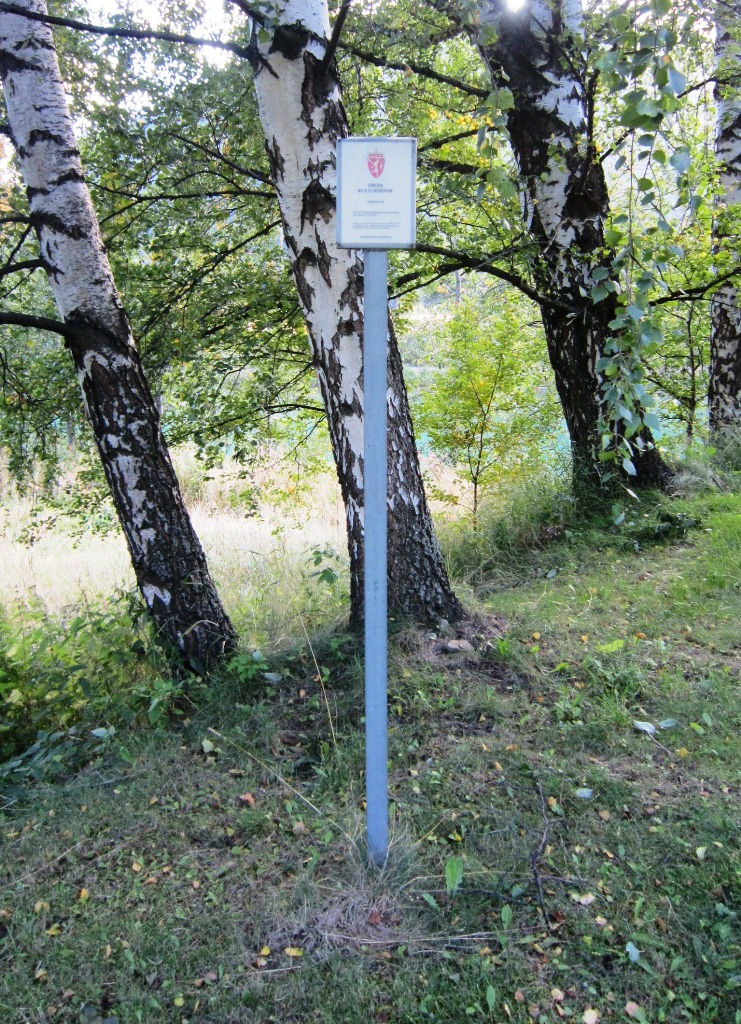
Sign marking the site of the medieval church and cemetery

== See also ==
- List of churches in Hamar
