= Vinstre =

Lake in Innlandet, Norway

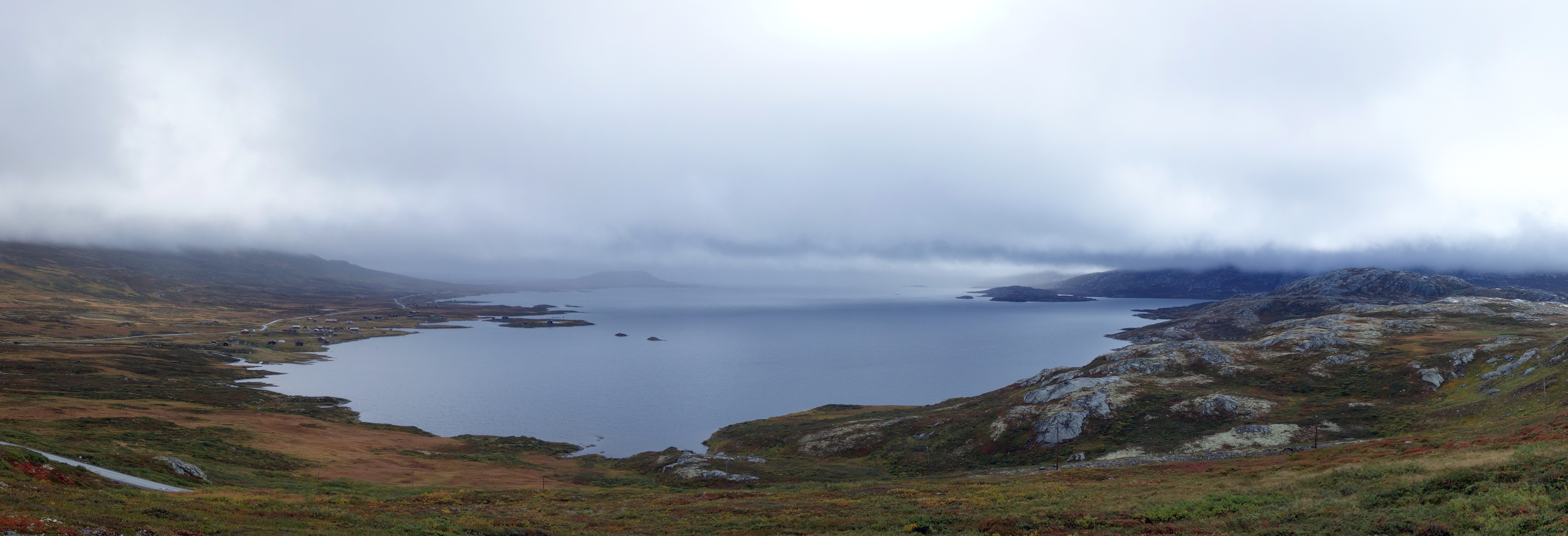
- Interactive map of the lake
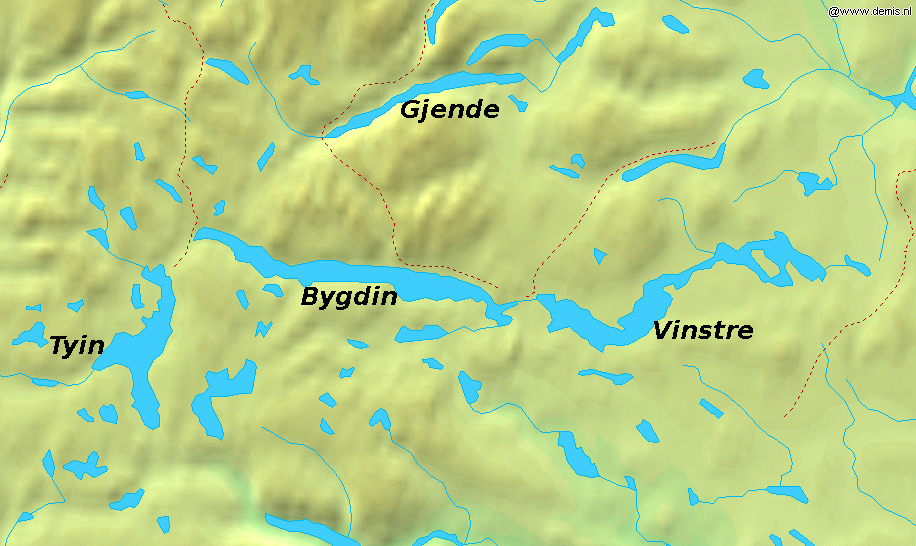
- Location: Innlandet, Norway
- Coordinates: 61.32709°N 08.8359°E
- Basin countries: Norway
- Max. length: 17 kilometres (11 mi)
- Max. width: 3 kilometres (1.9 mi)
- Surface area: 27.87 km^{2} (10.76 sq mi)
- Max. depth: 37 metres (121 ft)
- Surface elevation: 1,032 metres (3,386 ft)
- References: NVE

Vinstre is a lake in Innlandet county, Norway. The 27.87-square-kilometre (10.76 sq mi) lake lies in Øystre Slidre Municipality and the very western tip of the lake crosses over into the neighboring Vang Municipality. The lake sits at an elevation of 1,032 metres (3,386 ft) above sea level. Vinstre was regulated in connection with the construction of the Øvre Vinstra hydroelectric power plant. The lake Bygdin flows into this lake and on the opposite end, it flows out into the dammed lake Sandvatnet/Kaldfjorden/Øyvatnet which is the headwaters for the river Vinstra.

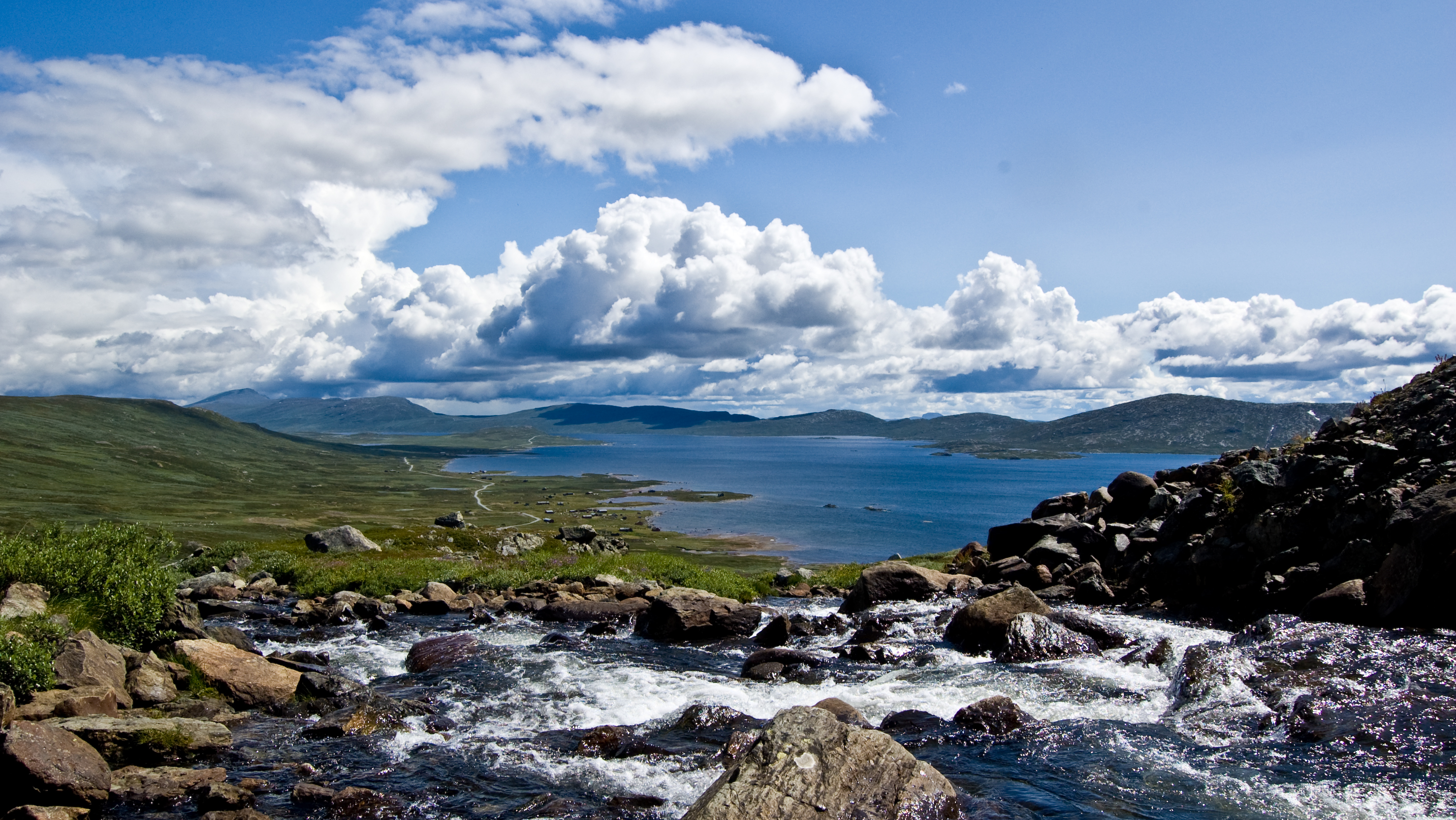

Along its northern shore runs the Jotunheimvegen summer toll road, built in the 1950s as a result of hydroelectricity development affecting the operation of the earlier milk boat service.

== Name ==
The name of the lake is (maybe) derived from the verb vinda which means "bend", "twist", or "wind" with the suffix -str added to the end. The name is therefore referring to the twisted shape of the lake. The river Vinstra starts from the lake.

== See also ==
- List of lakes in Norway
