= Peer Gynt (mountain road) =

Mountain road in Innlandet, Norway

Peer Gynt Road
- Peer Gyntvegen (Norwegian)
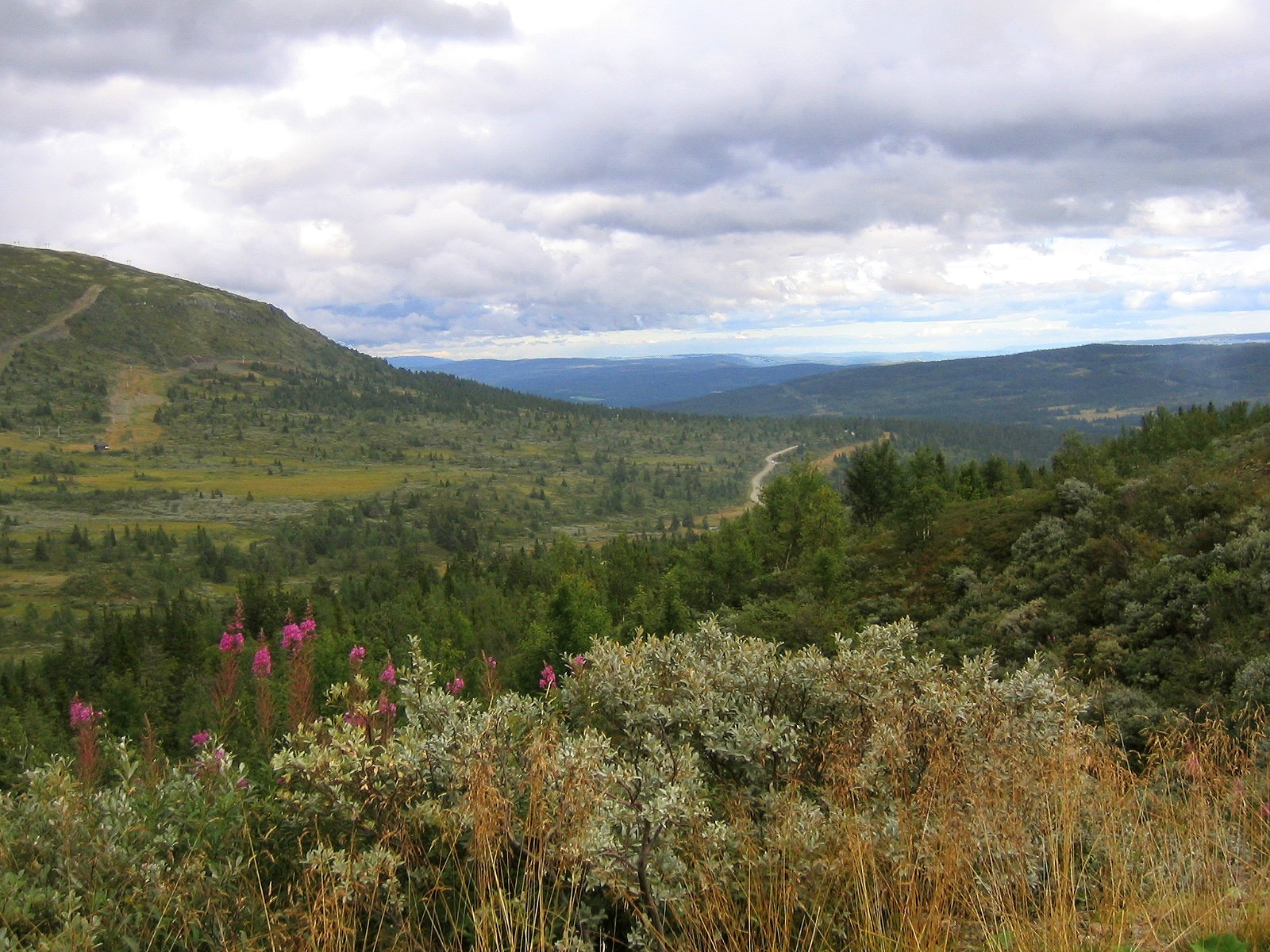

Route information
- Length: 57 km (35 mi)
- Status: Private toll road Only open in summer

Major junctions
- West end: Dalseter, Sør-Fron Municipality (61.4695°N 9.4594°E)
- East end: Skei, Gausdal Municipality (61.3384°N 10.0811°E)

Location
- Country: Norway

Highway system
- Roads in Norway; National Roads; County Roads

Peer Gynt Road (Norwegian: Peer Gyntvegen) is a 57-kilometre (35 mi) long tourist mountain road, named for the folkloric character Per Gynt. It is a privately owned toll road. It runs in the east of Norway in Innlandet county with views of Jotunheimen, along the villages Skeikampen, Fagerhøy, Gålå, Fefor, and Dalseter. The road goes through Sør-Fron Municipality, Nord-Fron Municipality, Ringebu Municipality, and Gausdal Municipality.

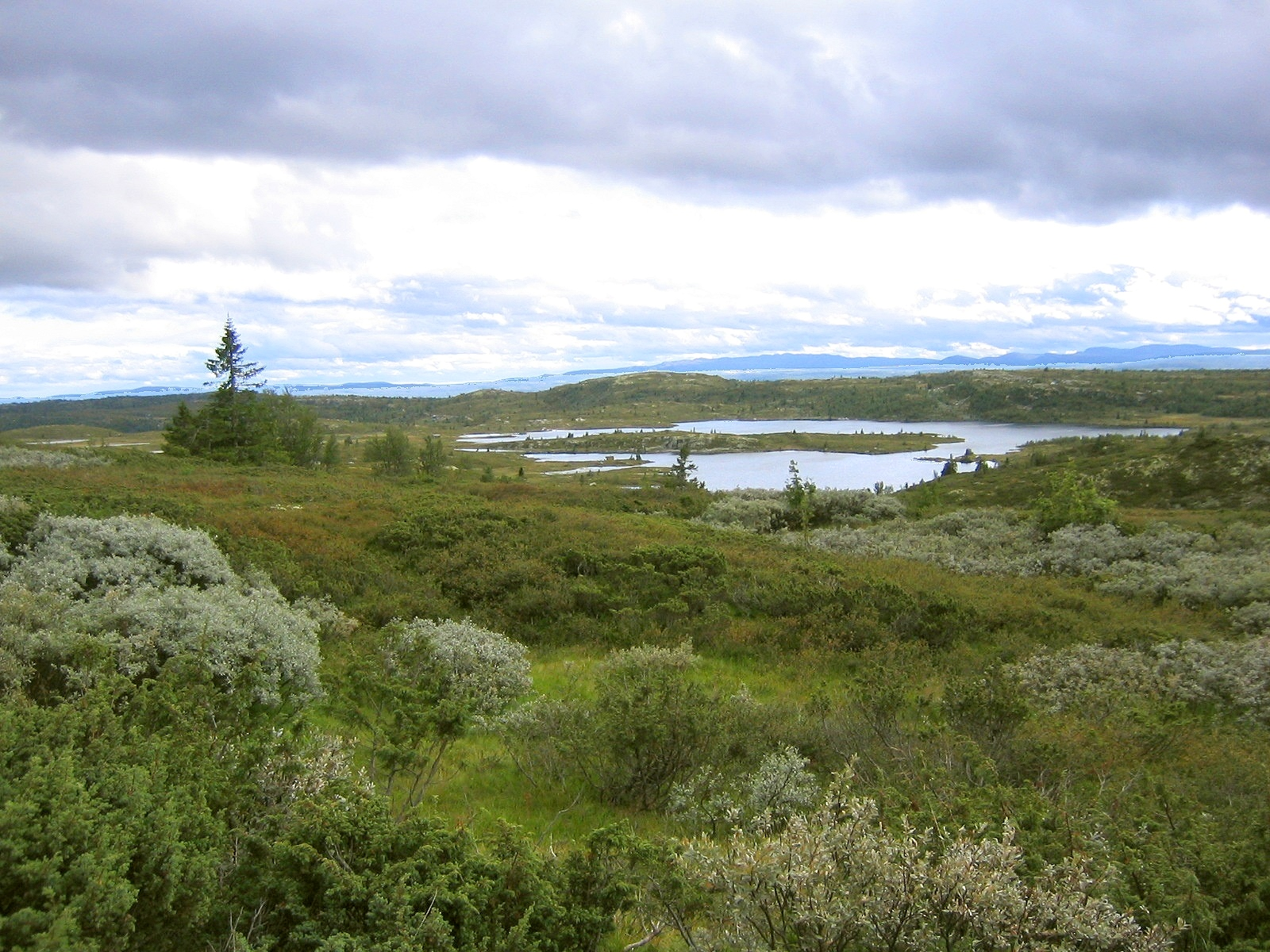
Peer Gynt road

The road has 2 sections: Dalseter to Fefor and then from Gålå to Skei. The part that connects the two parts is a Norwegian county road (not a private toll road). The 2 private sections are only open in the summer, usually opening around 1 June and closing when the snow starts. The road is not maintained in the winter.
