= Sødorp Church =

Church in Innlandet, Norway

- Sødorp kyrkje
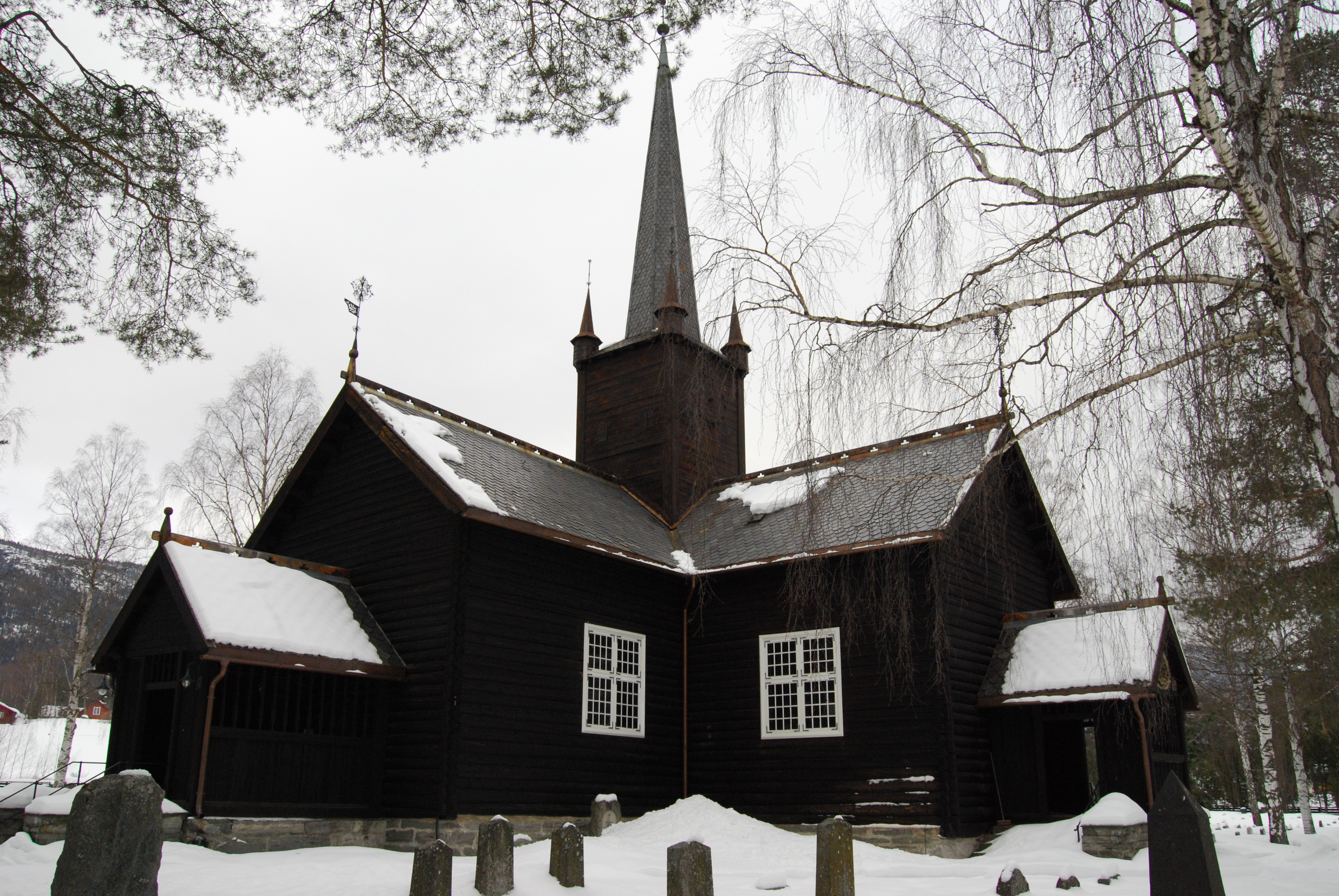
- View of the church
- Sødorp Church
- 61°35′57″N 9°44′09″E
- Location: Nord-Fron Municipality, Innlandet
- Country: Norway
- Denomination: Church of Norway
- Previous denomination: Catholic Church
- Churchmanship: Evangelical Lutheran

History
- Status: Parish church
- Founded: 13th century
- Consecrated: 1752
- Events: 1908: Church was moved

Architecture
- Functional status: Active
- Architect(s): Per Korpberget and Jens Korpberget
- Architectural type: Cruciform
- Completed: 1752 (274 years ago)

Specifications
- Capacity: 300
- Materials: Wood

Administration
- Diocese: Hamar bispedømme
- Deanery: Nord-Gudbrandsdal prosti
- Parish: Sødorp
- Norwegian Cultural Heritage Site
- Type: Church
- Status: Automatically protected
- ID: 85035

Sødorp Church (Norwegian: Sødorp kyrkje) is a parish church of the Church of Norway in Nord-Fron Municipality in Innlandet county, Norway. It is located in the town of Vinstra. It is the church for the Sødorp parish which is part of the Nord-Gudbrandsdal prosti (deanery) in the Diocese of Hamar. The brown, wooden church was built in a cruciform design in 1752 using plans drawn up by the architects Per Korpberget and his son Jens Korpberget (the church was disassembled and moved to its present location in 1908). The church seats about 300 people.

== History ==
The earliest existing historical records of the church date back to the year 1340, but the church did not date back to that year. The first church in Sødorp (historically: Old Norse: SudÞorpe) was a wooden stave church that was likely built during the 13th century. The church was originally located at Brandvoll, about 3 kilometres (1.9 mi) east of the present church site. (There is some circumstantial evidence that the church was first built at Toksen, and then later moved to Brandvoll, but this has not been proven. Regardless, the church was located at Brandvoll by the year 1432.) Around 1570, the old church was in poor condition, so it was replaced with a new wooden stave church with open-air corridors surrounding the building on a site right next to the old church. Apparently the old church was not torn down and it just sat next to the new church for many years and fell further into disrepair until eventually it was removed.

In the mid-1700s, the church was again in need of replacement. The steep, hillside land where the church was located was deemed to be unsuitable for a new church. A new site was chosen, about 650 metres (2,130 ft) to the south, on the relatively flat floor of the river valley. A new log church was built on the new site in 1750–1752 (on the site where the present-day Sødorp Chapel now stands). The lead builders were Erland Bryn and Hans Sæter, and the forging work was carried out by Hans Aande from Sør-Fron. The cruciform log building was consecrated on 12 September 1752 and was supposedly named «Den Herre Zebaoths kirke» ("Lord Sabaoth's Church"). After the new church was completed, the old church was torn down. By the 1780s, the graveyard and church site were plowed up into farming fields.

Historically, the Fron Church was the main church for the parish, but in 1850, the parish was divided into two parts (North and South Fron). When this division happened, Sødorp Church became the main church for the newly created parish of Nord-Fron. Also in 1850, the tower on top of the church blew down in a storm. It was replaced with a shorter tower.

In the early 20th century, the decision was made to move the church closer to the central part of the village of Vinstra. This decision was not without some local strife, but from 1908-1910, the church was disassembled and moved about 2.7 kilometres (1.7 mi) to the northwest where it was rebuilt. During the reconstruction, the tower was rebuilt as it looked before 1850, with a taller tower and spire. The church was oriented with the main entrance on the south side and the choir and sacristy on the north end. (In 1926, a new Sødorp Chapel was built where the church was located from 1752-1908.) The church was restored in 1960-1961. In 2008, the church was closed for several months as the tower was reinforced after a wind storm had made the tower unstable.

== Media gallery ==
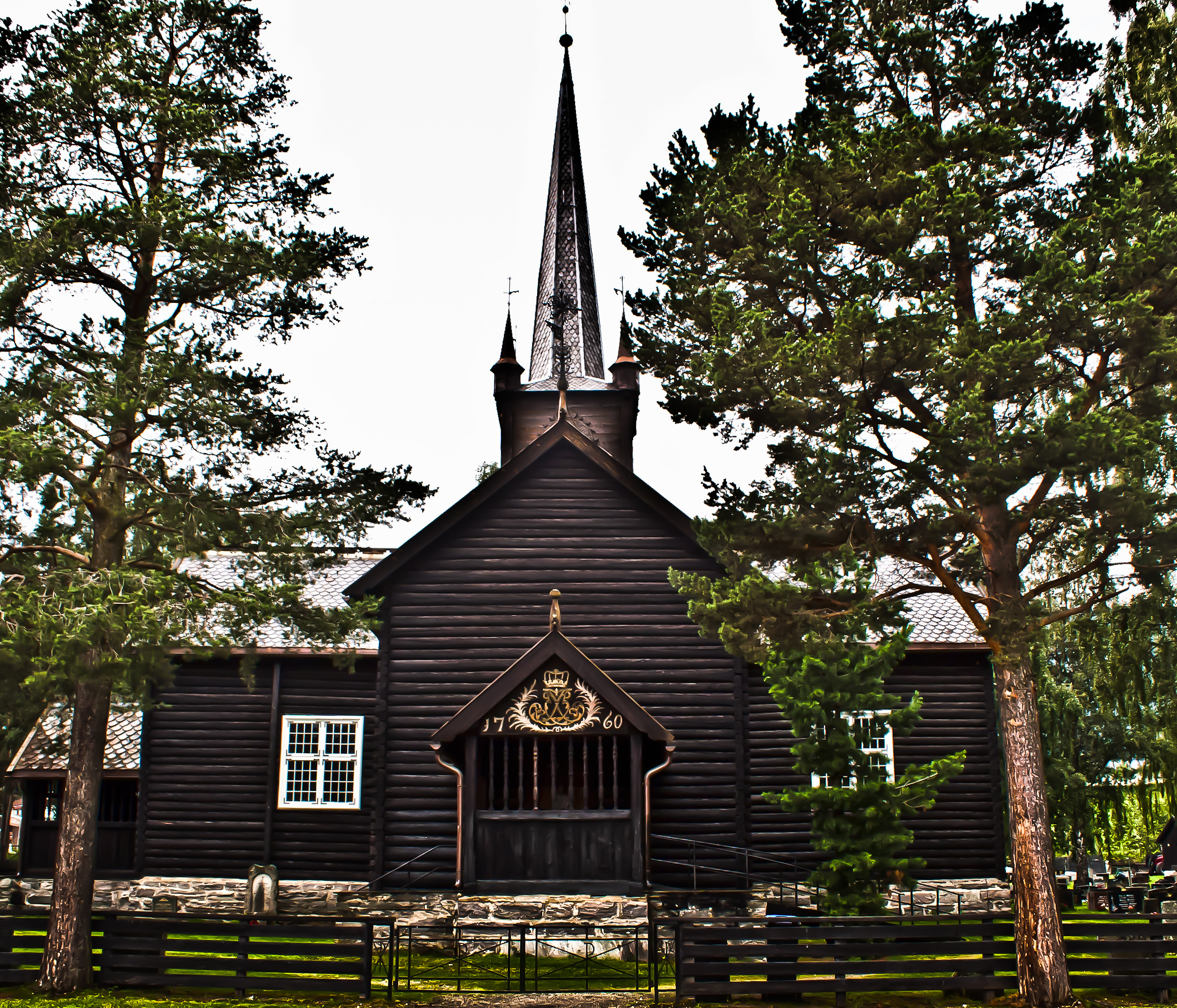
View of the present church building

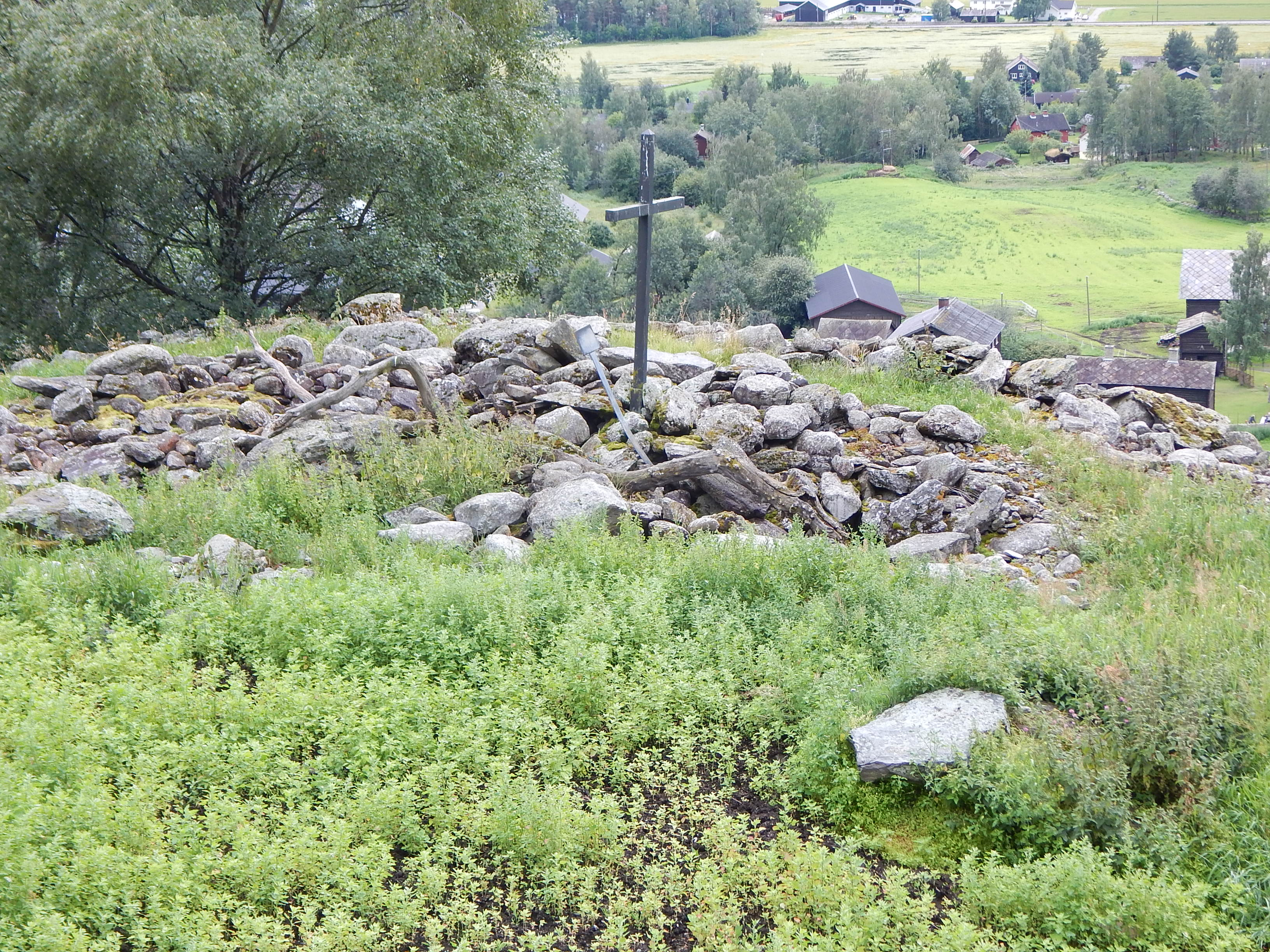
View of the old church site

== See also ==
- List of churches in Hamar
