= Nord-Fron Municipality =

Municipality in Innlandet, Norway

Nord-Fron Municipality Nord-Fron kommune
- Municipality
- Nordre Fron herred (historic name)
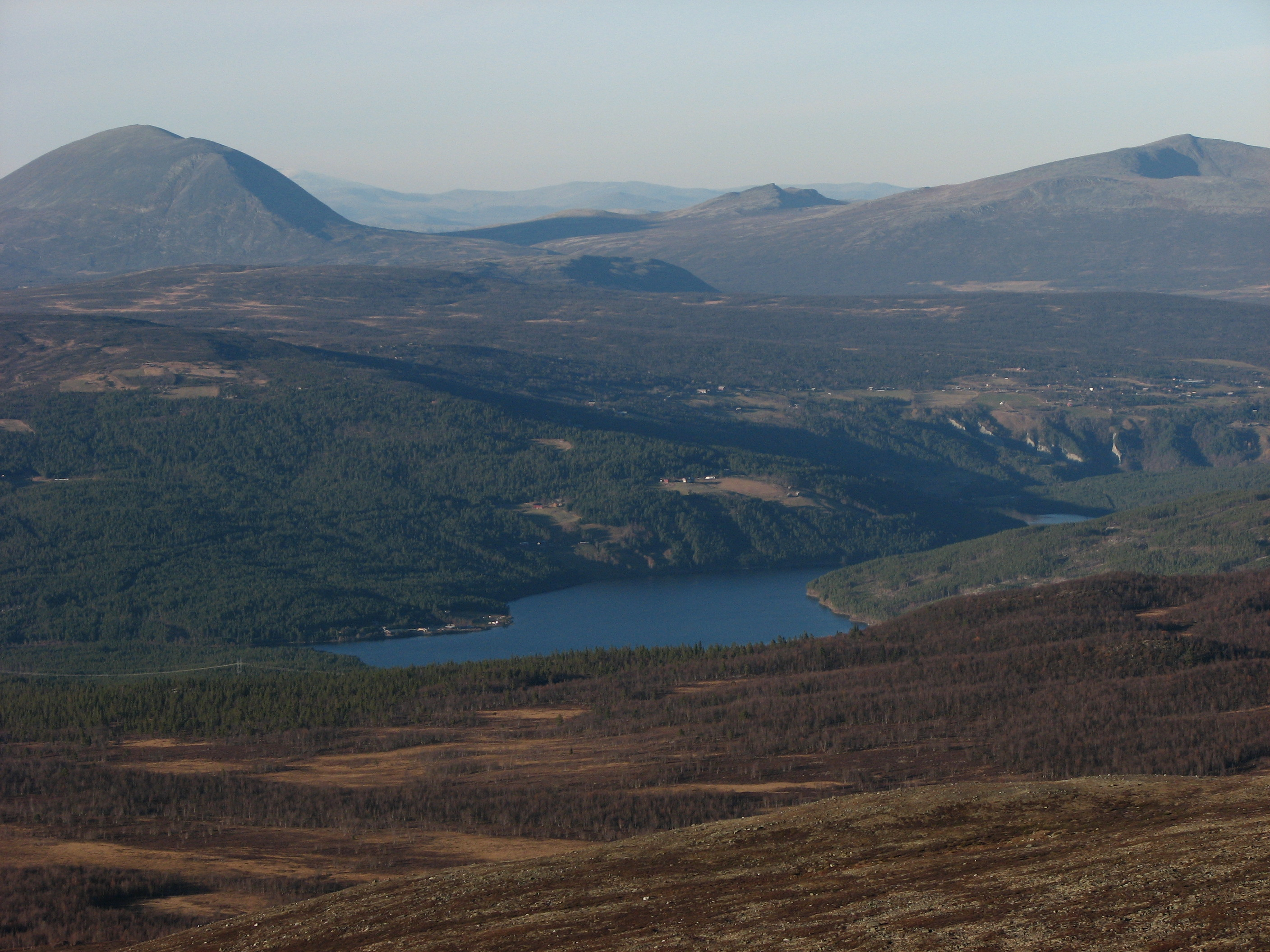
- View of the lake Olstappen and Skåbu village area

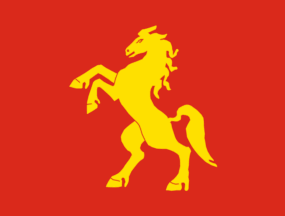
- Flag Coat of arms

- Innlandet within Norway

- Nord-Fron within Innlandet
- Coordinates: 61°39′32″N 9°43′40″E
- Country: Norway
- County: Innlandet
- District: Gudbrandsdal
- Established: 1 Jan 1851
  - Preceded by: Fron Municipality
- Disestablished: 1 Jan 1966
  - Succeeded by: Fron Municipality
- Re-established: 1 Jan 1977
  - Preceded by: Fron Municipality
- Administrative centre: Vinstra

Government
  - Mayor (2021): Anne-Marie Olstad (Ap)

Area
  - Total: 1,141.32 km^{2} (440.67 sq mi)
  - Land: 1,091.82 km^{2} (421.55 sq mi)
  - Water: 49.5 km^{2} (19.1 sq mi) 4.3%
  - Rank: #95 in Norway
- Highest elevation: 1,842.85 m (6,046.1 ft)

Population (2025)
  - Total: 5,553
  - Rank: #174 in Norway
  - Density: 4.9/km^{2} (13/sq mi)
  - Change (10 years): ▼ −3.1%
- Demonym: Frøning

Official language
  - Norwegian form: Nynorsk
- Time zone: UTC+01:00 (CET)
  - Summer (DST): UTC+02:00 (CEST)
- ISO 3166 code: NO-3436
- Website: Official website

Nord-Fron is a municipality in Innlandet county, Norway. It is located in the traditional district of Gudbrandsdal. The administrative centre of the municipality is the town of Vinstra. Other population centers in the municipality include the villages of Fefor, Kvam, and Skåbu.

The 1,141-square-kilometre (441 sq mi) municipality is the 95th largest by area out of the 357 municipalities in Norway. Nord-Fron Municipality is the 174th most populous municipality in Norway, with a population of 5,553. The municipality's population density is 4.9 inhabitants per square kilometre (13/sq mi), and its population has decreased by 3.1% over the previous 10-year period.

== General information ==
The prestegjeld of Fron was established as a civil municipality on 1 January 1838 when the new formannskapsdistrikt law was enacted. On 1 January 1851, Fron Municipality was divided in two. The northwest portion became Nord-Fron Municipality (population: 4,685), and the southeast portion became Sør-Fron Municipality (population: 3,421).

During the 1960s, there were many municipal mergers across Norway due to the work of the Schei Committee. On 1 January 1965, the Sjoa area (population: 413) was transferred from Nord-Fron Municipality to the neighboring Sel Municipality. Then, on 1 January 1966, Nord-Fron Municipality (population: 5,758) and Sør-Fron Municipality (population: 3,648) were merged to form a new Fron Municipality (with similar borders to the old Fron Municipality that existed from 1838 to 1851 minus the Sjoa area which was then part of Sel Municipality).

The 1966 merger was not well-liked among the residents of the new municipality. On 1 January 1977, the merger was reversed. Nord-Fron Municipality (population: 6,131) and Sør-Fron Municipality (population: 3,509) were recreated using their old borders from 1965.

Historically, the municipality was part of the old Oppland county. On 1 January 2020, the municipality became a part of the newly-formed Innlandet county (after Hedmark and Oppland counties were merged).

=== Name ===
The municipality (originally the parish) is named after the old Fron farm (Old Norse: Frón) since the first Fron Church was built there. The first element is nord which means "northern". The last element is uncertain, but it may come from the word frón, which means "earth" or "land". Thus the name of the municipality is "(the) northern (part of) Fron" (since the parish of Fron was divided in 1851 into a "north" and a "south" part). Historically, it was called Nordre Fron, using another word that also means "north". Historically, the name of the municipality was spelled Nordre Fron. On 3 November 1917, a royal resolution changed the spelling of the name of the municipality to Nord-Fron, using an alternate word for "north".

=== Coat of arms ===
The coat of arms was granted on 18 July 1980. The official blazon is "Gules, a horse forcené Or" (Norwegian: På raud botn ein oppreist gull hest). This means the arms have a red field (background), and the charge is a Dole Gudbrandsdal horse rearing up on its hind legs. The horse has a tincture of Or, which means it is commonly colored yellow, but if it is made out of metal, then gold is used. The Fron area has a long-standing tradition in horse breeding and is one of the main centres of horse breeding in Norway. Historically, the old Fron municipality used unofficial arms with a horse on it. After Fron was divided into Nord- and Sør-Fron in 1977, Nord-Fron chose these arms. Hallvard Trætteberg designed the arms. The municipal flag has the same design as the coat of arms.

=== Churches ===
The Church of Norway has four parishes (sokn) within Nord-Fron Municipality. It is part of the Nord-Gudbrandsdal prosti (deanery) in the Diocese of Hamar.

Churches in Nord-Fron Municipality
Parish (sokn)	Church name	Location of the church	Year built
Kvam	Kvam Church	Kvam	1952
Kvikne	Kvikne Church	Kvikne	1764
Skåbu	Skåbu Church	Skåbu	1927
Sødorp	Sødorp Church	Vinstra	1752
Sødorp	Sødorp Chapel	Vinstra	1929

== History ==
Number of minorities (1st and 2nd generation) in Nord-Fron by country of origin in 2017
Ancestry	Number
Poland	74
Eritrea	53
Syria	39
Lithuania	31
Afghanistan	28
Netherlands	21
Thailand	18

The Nord-Hoge farm in the Sødorp parish of Nord-Fron Municipality is the legendary home of Per Gynt. Per was made famous by Peter Asbjørnsen's folk tales and Henrik Ibsen's play Peer Gynt.

The body of Captain Sinclair is buried in Kvam.

The small Kvam Church, built in 1775, was burned down during the occupation of Norway by Nazi Germany during World War II. It was rebuilt after the war.

== Geography ==
Nord-Fron Municipality is bordered to the northwest by Sel Municipality, to the east and south by Sør-Fron Municipality, in the south by Øystre Slidre Municipality, and to the southwest by Vågå Municipality. The municipality stretches from the Rondane mountains in the north to the Jotunheimen mountains in the southwest. The highest point in the municipality is the 1,842.85-metre (6,046.1 ft) tall mountain Heimdalshøe, on the border with Vågå Municipality.

There are two main population centres in Nord-Fron: the town of Vinstra in the central part of the municipality and the village of Kvam in the north. Kvam is located at the northern end of the Peer Gynt Road, which passes through high roads with excellent views of the Jotunheimen, Dovrefjell, and Rondane mountain.

Lakes in the area include Feforvatnet, Olstappen, Øyangen, and Vinstervatna. Mountains in the region include Gravdalsknappen, Heimdalshøe, Hornflågan, Ingulssjøhøi, Saukampen, Sikkilsdalshøa, Styggehøe, and Smiubelgen.

== Government ==
Nord-Fron Municipality is responsible for primary education (through 10th grade), outpatient health services, senior citizen services, welfare and other social services, zoning, economic development, and municipal roads and utilities. The municipality is governed by a municipal council of directly elected representatives. The mayor is indirectly elected by a vote of the municipal council. The municipality is under the jurisdiction of the Gudbrandsdal District Court and the Eidsivating Court of Appeal.

=== Municipal council ===
The municipal council (Kommunestyre) of Nord-Fron Municipality is made up of 25 representatives that are elected to four-year terms. The tables below show the current and historical composition of the council by political party.

Nord-Fron kommunestyre 2023–2027
Party name (in Nynorsk)	Number of representatives
Labour Party (Arbeidarpartiet)	11
Progress Party (Framstegspartiet)	2
Conservative Party (Høgre)	3
Christian Democratic Party (Kristeleg Folkeparti)	1
Red Party (Raudt)	1
Centre Party (Senterpartiet)	7
Total number of members:	25

Nord-Fron kommunestyre 2019–2023
Party name (in Nynorsk)	Number of representatives
Labour Party (Arbeidarpartiet)	15
Progress Party (Framstegspartiet)	1
Conservative Party (Høgre)	2
Centre Party (Senterpartiet)	7
Total number of members:	25

Nord-Fron kommunestyre 2015–2019
Party name (in Nynorsk)	Number of representatives
Labour Party (Arbeidarpartiet)	13
Progress Party (Framstegspartiet)	1
Conservative Party (Høgre)	2
Centre Party (Senterpartiet)	9
Total number of members:	25

Nord-Fron kommunestyre 2011–2015
Party name (in Nynorsk)	Number of representatives
Labour Party (Arbeidarpartiet)	10
Progress Party (Framstegspartiet)	1
Conservative Party (Høgre)	3
Christian Democratic Party (Kristeleg Folkeparti)	1
Centre Party (Senterpartiet)	7
Liberal Party (Venstre)	3
Total number of members:	25

Nord-Fron kommunestyre 2007–2011
Party name (in Nynorsk)	Number of representatives
Labour Party (Arbeidarpartiet)	12
Conservative Party (Høgre)	2
Christian Democratic Party (Kristeleg Folkeparti)	1
Centre Party (Senterpartiet)	7
Socialist Left Party (Sosialistisk Venstreparti)	1
Liberal Party (Venstre)	2
Total number of members:	25

Nord-Fron kommunestyre 2003–2007
Party name (in Nynorsk)	Number of representatives
Labour Party (Arbeidarpartiet)	14
Conservative Party (Høgre)	2
Christian Democratic Party (Kristeleg Folkeparti)	1
Centre Party (Senterpartiet)	6
Socialist Left Party (Sosialistisk Venstreparti)	2
Total number of members:	25

Nord-Fron kommunestyre 1999–2003
Party name (in Nynorsk)	Number of representatives
Labour Party (Arbeidarpartiet)	20
Conservative Party (Høgre)	2
Christian Democratic Party (Kristeleg Folkeparti)	2
Centre Party (Senterpartiet)	6
Socialist Left Party (Sosialistisk Venstreparti)	1
Total number of members:	31

Nord-Fron kommunestyre 1995–1999
Party name (in Nynorsk)	Number of representatives
Labour Party (Arbeidarpartiet)	19
Conservative Party (Høgre)	2
Christian Democratic Party (Kristeleg Folkeparti)	1
Centre Party (Senterpartiet)	8
Socialist Left Party (Sosialistisk Venstreparti)	1
Total number of members:	31

Nord-Fron kommunestyre 1991–1995
Party name (in Nynorsk)	Number of representatives
Labour Party (Arbeidarpartiet)	17
Conservative Party (Høgre)	2
Christian Democratic Party (Kristeleg Folkeparti)	1
Centre Party (Senterpartiet)	8
Socialist Left Party (Sosialistisk Venstreparti)	3
Total number of members:	31

Nord-Fron kommunestyre 1987–1991
Party name (in Nynorsk)	Number of representatives
Labour Party (Arbeidarpartiet)	20
Conservative Party (Høgre)	3
Christian Democratic Party (Kristeleg Folkeparti)	1
Centre Party (Senterpartiet)	5
Socialist Left Party (Sosialistisk Venstreparti)	2
Total number of members:	31

Nord-Fron kommunestyre 1983–1987
Party name (in Nynorsk)	Number of representatives
Labour Party (Arbeidarpartiet)	21
Conservative Party (Høgre)	3
Christian Democratic Party (Kristeleg Folkeparti)	1
Centre Party (Senterpartiet)	5
Socialist Left Party (Sosialistisk Venstreparti)	1
Total number of members:	31

Nord-Fron kommunestyre 1979–1983
Party name (in Nynorsk)	Number of representatives
Labour Party (Arbeidarpartiet)	18
Conservative Party (Høgre)	4
Christian Democratic Party (Kristeleg Folkeparti)	1
Centre Party (Senterpartiet)	6
Socialist Left Party (Sosialistisk Venstreparti)	1
Liberal Party (Venstre)	1
Total number of members:	31
Note: On 1 January 1977, Fron Municipality was divided into Nord-Fron Municipality and Sør-Fron Municipality (reversing the merger from 1 January 1966). A special election was held in 1976 for a new council that existed from 1977 to 1979.

Nord-Fron kommunestyre 1963–1965
Party name (in Nynorsk)	Number of representatives
Labour Party (Arbeidarpartiet)	16
Conservative Party (Høgre)	1
Christian Democratic Party (Kristeleg Folkeparti)	1
Centre Party (Senterpartiet)	6
List of workers, fishermen, and small farmholders (Arbeidarar, fiskarar, småbrukarar liste)	1
Total number of members:	25
Note: On 1 January 1966, Nord-Fron Municipality and Sør-Fron Municipality were merged into Fron Municipality.

Nord-Fron heradsstyre 1959–1963
Party name (in Nynorsk)	Number of representatives
Labour Party (Arbeidarpartiet)	15
Conservative Party (Høgre)	1
Christian Democratic Party (Kristeleg Folkeparti)	2
Centre Party (Senterpartiet)	7
Total number of members:	25

Nord-Fron heradsstyre 1955–1959
Party name (in Nynorsk)	Number of representatives
Labour Party (Arbeidarpartiet)	16
Conservative Party (Høgre)	1
Christian Democratic Party (Kristeleg Folkeparti)	1
Farmers' Party (Bondepartiet)	7
Total number of members:	25

Nord-Fron heradsstyre 1951–1955
Party name (in Nynorsk)	Number of representatives
Labour Party (Arbeidarpartiet)	15
Joint List(s) of Non-Socialist Parties (Borgarlege Felleslister)	9
Total number of members:	24

Nord-Fron heradsstyre 1947–1951
Party name (in Nynorsk)	Number of representatives
Labour Party (Arbeidarpartiet)	15
Farmers' Party (Bondepartiet)	3
Joint List(s) of Non-Socialist Parties (Borgarlege Felleslister)	6
Total number of members:	24

Nord-Fron heradsstyre 1945–1947
Party name (in Nynorsk)	Number of representatives
Labour Party (Arbeidarpartiet)	15
Farmers' Party (Bondepartiet)	7
Joint list of the Liberal Party (Venstre) and the Radical People's Party (Radikale Folkepartiet)	2
Total number of members:	24

Nord-Fron heradsstyre 1937–1941*
Party name (in Nynorsk)	Number of representatives
Labour Party (Arbeidarpartiet)	14
Farmers' Party (Bondepartiet)	8
Joint list of the Liberal Party (Venstre) and the Radical People's Party (Radikale Folkepartiet)	2
Total number of members:	24
Note: Due to the German occupation of Norway during World War II, no elections were held for new municipal councils until after the war ended in 1945.

=== Mayors ===
The mayor (Nynorsk: ordførar) of Nord-Fron Municipality is the political leader of the municipality and the chairperson of the municipal council. Here is a list of people who have held this position:

- 1851–1853: John J. Harildstad
- 1854–1854: Rev. N.W. Christie
- 1855–1855: John J. Harildstad
- 1862–1862: Peder O. Brandvold
- 1870–1871: Peder O. Brandvold
- 1872–1877: Tjøstel Harildstad
- 1878–1881: Johan A. Bøe
- 1882–1893: Johannes Kongslie
- 1894–1898: Ole Iversen Teige (V)
- 1899–1901: Ole Larsen
- 1902–1907: Ole Iversen Teige (V)
- 1908–1910: Johannes Solbraa
- 1910–1919: Johannes Krukhaug (Ap)
- 1919–1922: O.E. Hagen (Ap)
- 1922–1928: Hans Kjørum (Ap)
- 1928–1931: Albert Kvammen (Ap)
- 1931–1934: Thor Aasmundstad (Bp)
- 1931–1940: Albert Kvammen (Ap)
- 1941–1942: Petter M. Sandbu (NS)
- 1942–1945: Per M. Myrhaugen (NS)
- 1945–1955: Albert Kvammen (Ap)
- 1956–1965: Paul Brenna (Ap)
- (1966–1977: part of Fron Municipality)
- 1977–1983: Tollef Beitrusten (Ap)
- 1983–2007: Gunnar Tore Stenseng (Ap)
- 2007–2011: Tove Haugli (Ap)
- 2011–2015: Olav Røssum (Sp)
- 2015–2021: Rune Støstad (Ap)
- 2021–present: Anne-Marie Olstad (Ap)

== Attractions ==
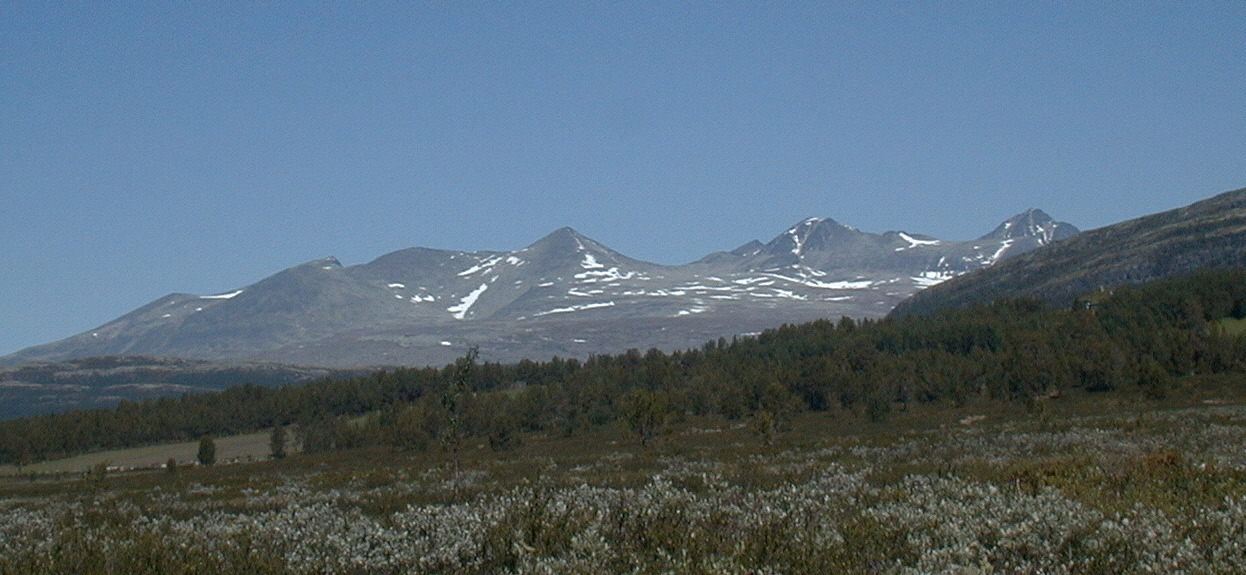
Smiubelgen in Rondane National Park

=== Royal residence ===
The Royal Mountain Chalet, Prinsehytta, is located in the Sikkilsdalen valley in Nord-Fron. It is used as a royal residence by the Norwegian royal family for hunting trips and during the Easter and winter holidays.

=== Eidefoss petroglyphs ===
The rock carvings at Eidefoss are located on the east side of the river south of the white water.

=== National parks ===
- Rondane National Park, which lies partially in Nord-Fron Municipality, was the first Norwegian National Park, established on 21 December 1962. In 2003, Rondane National Park was enlarged, and smaller areas of nature protection were opened or enlarged.
- Jotunheim National Park is not technically in Nord-Fron Municipality, but its southern border brushes Nord-Fron's western border.

== Sister cities ==
Nord-Fron has sister city agreements with the following places:

- - Hedemora, Dalarna County, Sweden
- - Richmond, North Yorkshire, England, United Kingdom

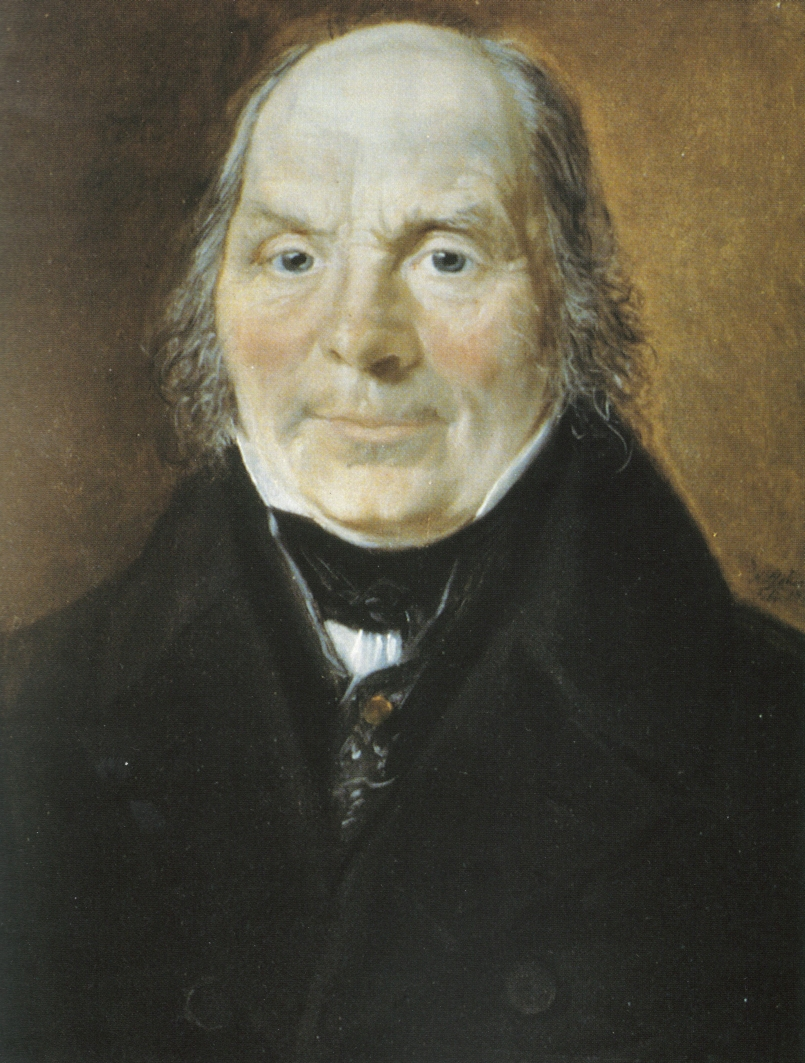
Ole Haagenstad

== Notable people ==
- Peder Per Veggum (1768 in Nord-Fron – 1836), an artist and rose painter, a cabinet carpenter and woodcarver; associated with the decorative folk art of Rosemaling
- Ole Paulssøn Haagenstad (1775 in Fron – 1866), a farmer and Norwegian politician
- Jacob Smith Jarmann (1816 in Nord-Fron – 1894), a firearms designer, invented the Jarmann M1884 rifle
- Hallstein Høgåsen (born 1937 in Nord-Fron), a theoretical physicist, main field elementary particle physics
- Grete Berget (1954 in Vinstra – 2017), a journalist and Norwegian politician
- Geir Helgemo (born 1970 in Vinstra), a professional bridge player and resident of Monaco
- Øystein Skar (born 1985 in Vinstra), a pianist and composer
