= Skåbu =

Village in Nord-Fron Municipality, Norway

Skåbu Skålbu
- Village
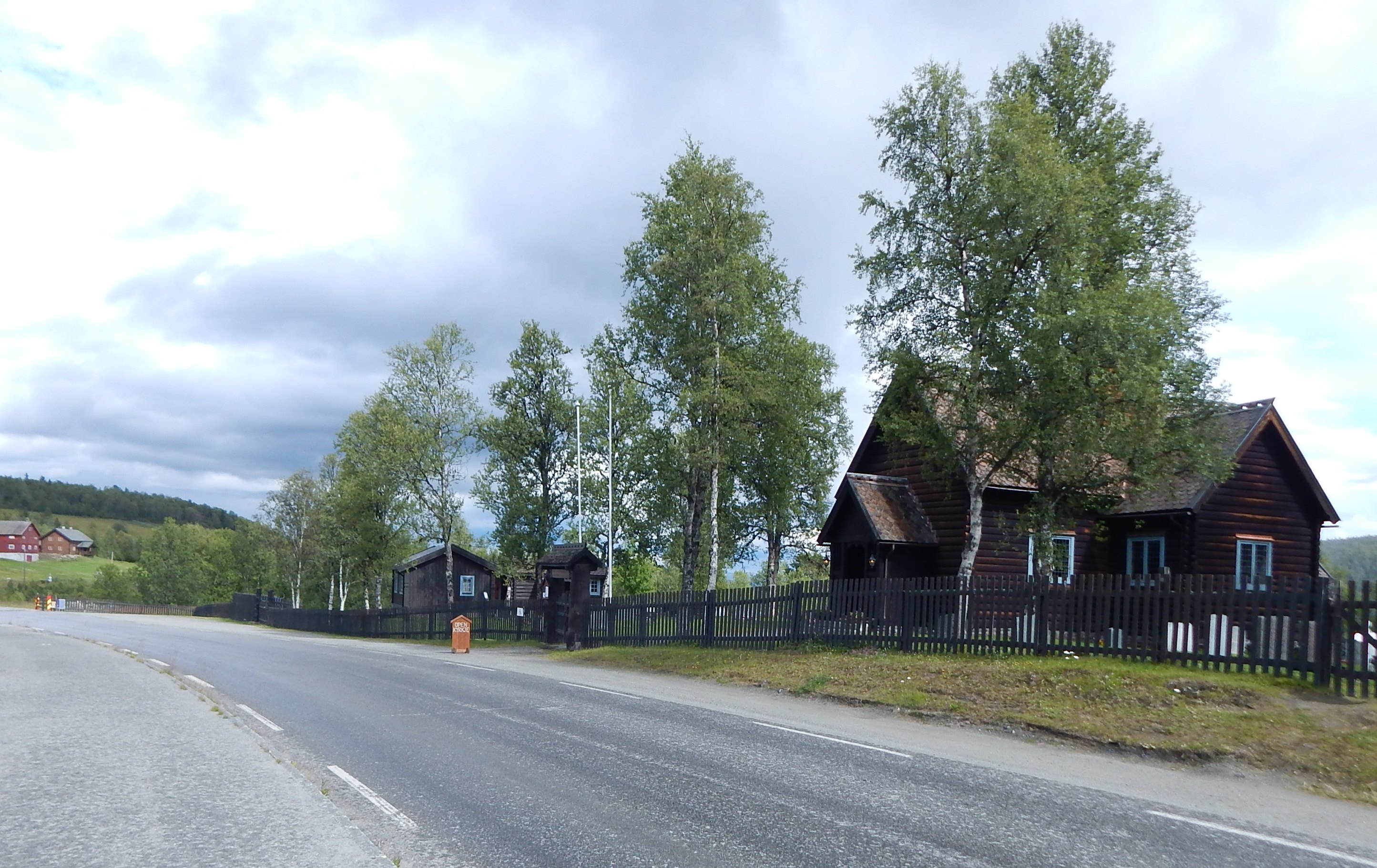
- View of the village church, Skåbu Church
- Interactive map of Skåbu
- Location within Innlandet Location within Norway
- Coordinates: 61.52962°N 9.41628°E
- Country: Norway
- Region: Eastern Norway
- County: Innlandet
- District: Gudbrandsdalen
- Municipality: Nord-Fron Municipality
- Elevation: 870 m (2,850 ft)
- Time zone: UTC+01:00 (CET)
  - Summer (DST): UTC+02:00 (CEST)
- Post Code: 2643 Skåbu

Skåbu is a village in Nord-Fron Municipality in Innlandet county, Norway. The village is located along the river Vinstra, about 20 kilometres (12 mi) southwest of the town of Vinstra. Skåbu has about 600 inhabitants. Skåbu Church is located in the village. Skåbu is situated at an elevation of 870 metres (2,850 ft) above sea level which makes it the highest permanently inhabited village in Norway.

== Name ==
The village is named after the old Skåbu farm (Old Norse: Skaðabú). The first element could come from the genitive case of skaði which means 'damage' or it could come from the male name Skaði. The last element is the word bú which means 'farm'.

== Climate ==
Due to its high altitude, it has a subarctic climate which is even colder than some arctic areas.

Climate data for Skåbu-Storslåen 1961-1990, extremes 1933-2015
Month	Jan	Feb	Mar	Apr	May	Jun	Jul	Aug	Sep	Oct	Nov	Dec	Year
Record high °C (°F)	8.5 (47.3)	10.0 (50.0)	10.5 (50.9)	17.5 (63.5)	23.0 (73.4)	27.2 (81.0)	27.5 (81.5)	27.5 (81.5)	23.0 (73.4)	17.5 (63.5)	11.0 (51.8)	8.0 (46.4)	27.5 (81.5)
Mean daily maximum °C (°F)	−5.7 (21.7)	−4.4 (24.1)	−0.9 (30.4)	3.3 (37.9)	10.2 (50.4)	15.1 (59.2)	16.5 (61.7)	15.1 (59.2)	9.6 (49.3)	4.4 (39.9)	−2.0 (28.4)	−4.0 (24.8)	4.8 (40.6)
Mean daily minimum °C (°F)	−11.9 (10.6)	−11.5 (11.3)	−9.0 (15.8)	−5.0 (23.0)	1.0 (33.8)	4.9 (40.8)	6.4 (43.5)	5.4 (41.7)	1.4 (34.5)	−2.1 (28.2)	−7.7 (18.1)	−10.4 (13.3)	−3.2 (26.2)
Record low °C (°F)	−33.0 (−27.4)	−31.0 (−23.8)	−25.0 (−13.0)	−16.5 (2.3)	−10.5 (13.1)	−4.0 (24.8)	−1.5 (29.3)	−3.0 (26.6)	−9.0 (15.8)	−15.5 (4.1)	−20.5 (−4.9)	−30.2 (−22.4)	−33.0 (−27.4)
Average precipitation mm (inches)	34 (1.3)	21 (0.8)	27 (1.1)	23 (0.9)	44 (1.7)	62 (2.4)	74 (2.9)	70 (2.8)	54 (2.1)	53 (2.1)	45 (1.8)	33 (1.3)	540 (21.2)
Average precipitation days	10.0	6.0	7.4	6.1	7.8	11.4	11.7	11.1	9.1	8.8	8.9	8.3	106.6
Source: Met Norway Eklima
