= Vinstra =

Town in Innlandet, Norway

- Town/City
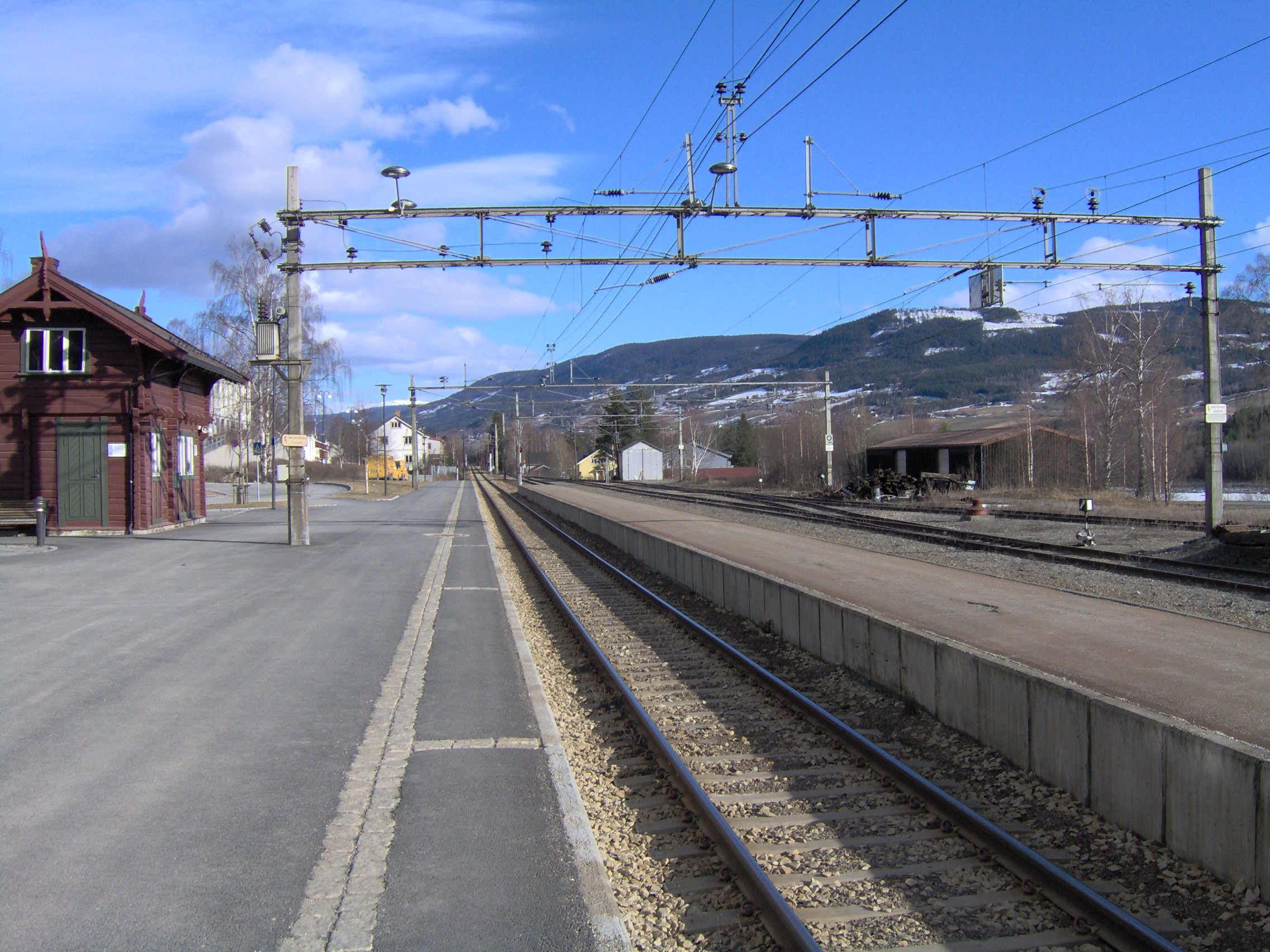
- View of the town train station
- Interactive map of Vinstra
- Location within Innlandet Location within Norway
- Coordinates: 61.59496°N 9.75134°E
- Country: Norway
- Region: Eastern Norway
- County: Innlandet
- District: Gudbrandsdalen
- Municipality: Nord-Fron Municipality
- Established as
- Town (By): 1 Sept 2013

Area
  - Total: 3.13 km^{2} (1.21 sq mi)
- Elevation: 241 m (791 ft)

Population (2024)
  - Total: 2,674
  - Density: 854/km^{2} (2,210/sq mi)
- Demonym: Vinstervær
- Time zone: UTC+01:00 (CET)
  - Summer (DST): UTC+02:00 (CEST)
- Post Code: 2640 Vinstra

Vinstra is a town in Nord-Fron Municipality in Innlandet county, Norway. The town is the administrative centre of the municipality. The town is located in the Gudbrandsdalen valley, at the confluence of the Gudbrandsdalslågen river and the Vinstra river (which flows from the lake Vinstre). The 3.13-square-kilometre (770-acre) town has a population (2024) of 2,674 and a population density of 854 inhabitants per square kilometre (2,210/sq mi).

The European route E6 highway and the Dovrebanen railway line both pass through the town. The Vinstra Upper Secondary School and the Sødorp Church are both located in the town as well. The newspaper Dølen is published in Vinstra.

The village of Vinstra was granted the status of a "town" on 1 September 2013, an event that was celebrated for 3 days.

== Peer Gynt ==
Peder Olsen Hågå from Vinstra was the model for the main character in Henrik Ibsen’s dramatic poem Peer Gynt which was published in 1867. In the old cemetery at Sødorp Chapel, there stands a monument to Peer Gynt, and each year since 1967 the Peer Gynt Festival (Peer Gynt-stemnet) has been held on the Peer Gynt farm, Hågå. The farm consists of 15 old buildings, and the rally includes, among other things, an open-air performance of the play. In addition, the Peer Gynt Road runs from Vinstra through Gålå to Lillehammer and the Peer Gynt Mountain Road via Rondablikk to Kvam.

== See also ==
- List of towns and cities in Norway
