= Fron Municipality =

Former municipality in Oppland, Norway

Fron Municipality Fron herred
- Former municipality
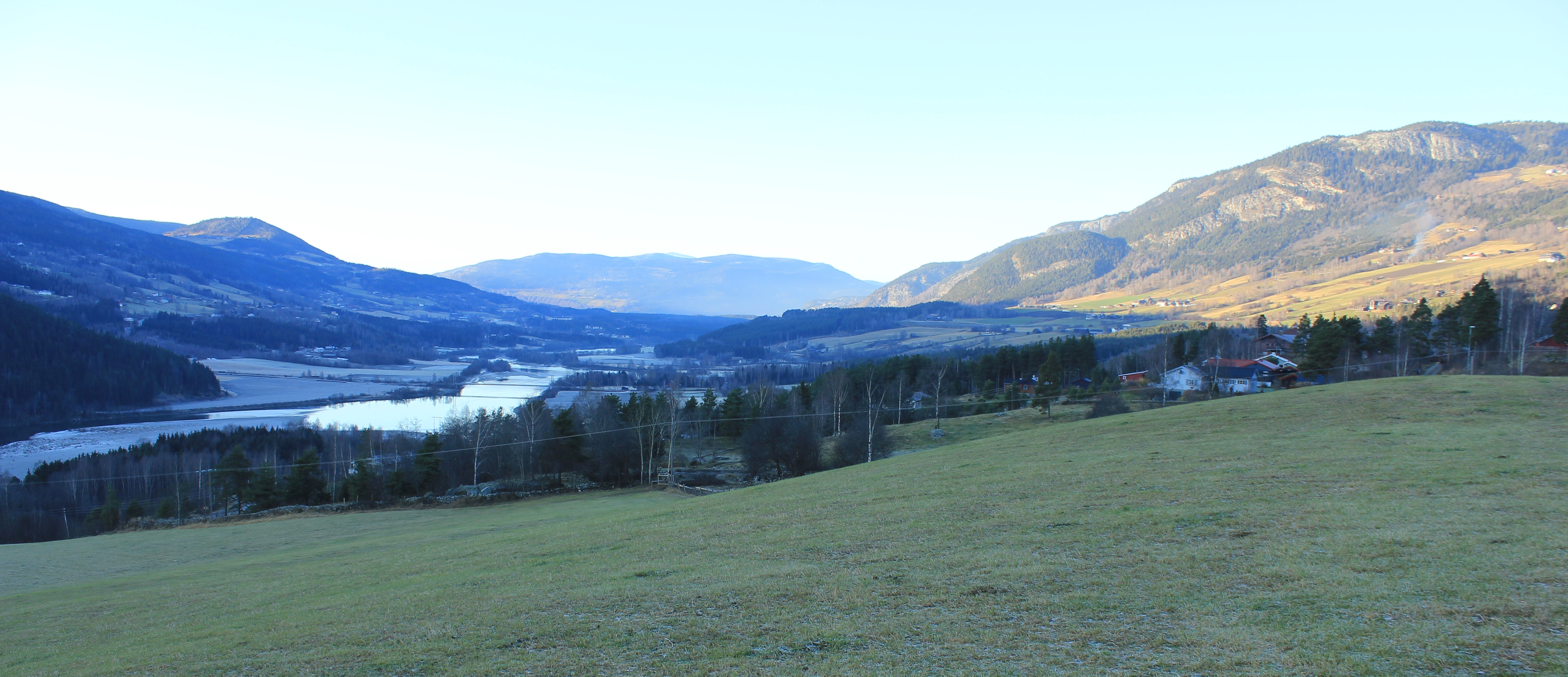
- View of the Fron area

- Oppland within Norway

- Fron within Oppland
- Coordinates: 61°35′24″N 9°46′35″E
- Country: Norway
- County: Oppland
- District: Gudbrandsdal
- Established: 1 Jan 1838
  - Created as: Formannskapsdistrikt
- Disestablished: 1 Jan 1851
  - Succeeded by: Nord-Fron and Sør-Fron municipalities
- Re-established: 1 Jan 1966
  - Preceded by: Nord-Fron and Sør-Fron municipalities
- Disestablished: 1 Jan 1977
  - Succeeded by: Nord-Fron and Sør-Fron municipalities
- Administrative centre: Hundorp

Government
  - Mayor (1976-1977): Asbjørn Myrvang (Ap)

Area (upon dissolution)
  - Total: 1,886.10 km^{2} (728.23 sq mi)
  - Land: 1,806.13 km^{2} (697.35 sq mi)
  - Water: 79.97 km^{2} (30.88 sq mi) 4.2%
  - Rank: #34 in Norway
- Highest elevation: 1,842.85 m (6,046.1 ft)

Population (1976)
  - Total: 9,633
  - Rank: #93 in Norway
  - Density: 5.1/km^{2} (13/sq mi)
  - Change (10 years): ▲ +2.4%
- Demonym: Frøning

Official language
  - Norwegian form: Nynorsk
- Time zone: UTC+01:00 (CET)
  - Summer (DST): UTC+02:00 (CEST)
- ISO 3166 code: NO-0518

Fron is a former municipality in the old Oppland county, Norway. The 1,886-square-kilometre (728 sq mi) municipality was located in the traditional district of Gudbrandsdal. Fron Municipality has existed twice: from 1838 to 1851 and again from 1966 to 1977. The area is now divided between Nord-Fron Municipality and Sør-Fron Municipality in Innlandet county. The administrative centre was the village of Hundorp where the Sør-Fron Church was located. Other villages in the municipality included Gålå, Harpefoss, Kvam, Lia, Skåbu, and Vinstra.

Prior to its dissolution in 1977, the 1,886.1-square-kilometre (728.2 sq mi) municipality was the 34th largest by area out of the 445 municipalities in Norway. Fron Municipality was the 93rd most populous municipality in Norway with a population of about 9,633. The municipality's population density was 5.1 inhabitants per square kilometre (13/sq mi) and its population had increased by 2.4% over the previous 10-year period.

== General information ==
The prestegjeld of Fron was established as a civil municipality on 1 January 1838 when the new formannskapsdistrikt law went into effect. On 1 January 1851, the municipality was divided in two. The northwest portion became Nord-Fron Municipality (population: 4,685) and the southeast portion became Sør-Fron Municipality (population: 3,421).

During the 1960s, there were many municipal mergers across Norway due to the work of the Schei Committee. On 1 January 1965, the Sjoa area (population: 413) was transferred from Nord-Fron Municipality to the neighboring Sel Municipality. Then, on 1 January 1966, Nord-Fron Municipality (population: 5,758) and Sør-Fron Municipality (population: 3,648) were merged to form a new Fron Municipality (with similar borders to the old Fron municipality that existed from 1838 to 1851 minus the Sjoa area which was then part of Sel Municipality).

The 1966 merger was not well-liked among the residents of the new municipality. On 1 January 1977, the merger was reversed and Nord-Fron Municipality (population: 6,131) and Sør-Fron Municipality (population: 3,509) were recreated using their old borders from 1965.

Since that time, there have been talks about reuniting the two municipalities once again, but the plans have not come to pass. In the 2010s, Nord-Fron Municipality, Sør-Fron Municipality, and Ringebu Municipality looked into merging, but this did not happen. Nord-Fron Municipality also made inquiries to merge with Sel Municipality, but this did not happen either.

=== Name ===
The municipality (originally the parish) is named after the old Fron farm (Old Norse: Frón) since the first Fron Church was built there. The meaning of the name is uncertain, but it may come from the word frón which means "earth" or "land".

=== Churches ===
The Church of Norway had four parishes (sokn) within Fron Municipality. At the time of the municipal dissolution, Fron Municipality was divided between the Nord-Fron prestegjeld in the Nord-Gudbrandsdal prosti (deanery) and the Sør-Fron prestegjeld in the Sør-Gudbrandsdal prosti (deanery), both within the Diocese of Hamar.

Churches in Fron Municipality
Prestegjeld	Parish (sokn)	Church name	Location of the church	Year built
Nord-Fron	Kvam	Kvam Church	Kvam	1952
Nord-Fron	Kvikne	Kvikne Church	Kvikne	1764
Nord-Fron	Kvikne	Skåbu Chapel	Skåbu	1927
Nord-Fron	Sødorp	Sødorp Church	Vinstra	1752
Nord-Fron	Sødorp	Sødorp Chapel	Vinstra	1929
Sør-Frøn	Sør-Frøn	Sør-Fron Church	Hundorp	1792
Sør-Frøn	Sør-Frøn	Espedalen Chapel	Espedalen	1974

== Geography ==
Fron Municipality was located in the central part of the Gudbrandsdalen valley. Sel Municipality was to the north, Folldal Municipality and Stor-Elvdal Municipality were to the northeast, Ringebu Municipality was to the southeast, Gausdal Municipality was to the south, Øystre Slidre Municipality was to the southwest, and Vågå Municipality was to the west. The highest point in the municipality was the 1,842.85-metre (6,046.1 ft) tall mountain Heimdalshøe, located on the border with Vågå Municipality.

== Government ==
While it existed, Fron Municipality was responsible for primary education (through 10th grade), outpatient health services, senior citizen services, welfare and other social services, zoning, economic development, and municipal roads and utilities. The municipality was governed by a municipal council of directly elected representatives. The mayor was indirectly elected by a vote of the municipal council. The municipality was under the jurisdiction of the Eidsivating Court of Appeal.

=== Municipal council ===
The municipal council (Herredsstyre) of Fron Municipality was made up of representatives that were elected to four year terms. The tables below show the historical composition of the council by political party.

Fron kommunestyre 1975–1976
Party name (in Nynorsk)	Number of representatives
Labour Party (Arbeidarpartiet)	21
Conservative Party (Høgre)	1
Christian Democratic Party (Kristeleg Folkeparti)	1
Centre Party (Senterpartiet)	8
Socialist Left Party (Sosialistisk Venstreparti)	1
Sør-Fron Cross-politics party (Sør-Fron Tverrpolitiske parti)	3
Total number of members:	35
Note: On 1 January 1977, Fron Municipality was divided into Sør-Fron Municipality and Nord-Fron Municipality.

Fron kommunestyre 1971–1975
Party name (in Nynorsk)	Number of representatives
Labour Party (Arbeidarpartiet)	22
Conservative Party (Høgre)	1
Christian Democratic Party (Kristeleg Folkeparti)	1
Centre Party (Senterpartiet)	10
Liberal Party (Venstre)	1
Total number of members:	35

Fron kommunestyre 1967–1971
Party name (in Nynorsk)	Number of representatives
Labour Party (Arbeidarpartiet)	22
Conservative Party (Høgre)	1
Christian Democratic Party (Kristeleg Folkeparti)	1
Centre Party (Senterpartiet)	9
Socialist People's Party (Sosialistisk Folkeparti)	1
Liberal Party (Venstre)	1
Total number of members:	35

Fron kommunestyre 1966–1967
Party name (in Nynorsk)	Number of representatives
Labour Party (Arbeidarpartiet)	27
Conservative Party (Høgre)	1
Christian Democratic Party (Kristeleg Folkeparti)	1
Centre Party (Senterpartiet)	12
List of workers, fishermen, and small farmholders (Arbeidarar, fiskarar, småbrukarar liste)	1
Total number of members:	42
Note: On 1 January 1966, Sør-Fron Municipality and Nord-Fron Municipality were merged into Fron Municipality. The first council was the merger of the two old councils for Sør-Fron Municipality and Nord-Fron Municipality.

=== Mayors ===
The mayor (Nynorsk: ordførar) of Fron Municipality was the political leader of the municipality and the chairperson of the municipal council. The following people have held this position

- 1966–1968: Paul Brenna (Ap)
- 1969–1975: Tollef Beitrusten (Ap)
- 1975–1977: Asbjørn Myrvang (Ap)

== See also ==
- List of former municipalities of Norway
