= Sør-Gudbrandsdal District Court =

Former district court in Norway

- Sør-Gudbrandsdal tingrett
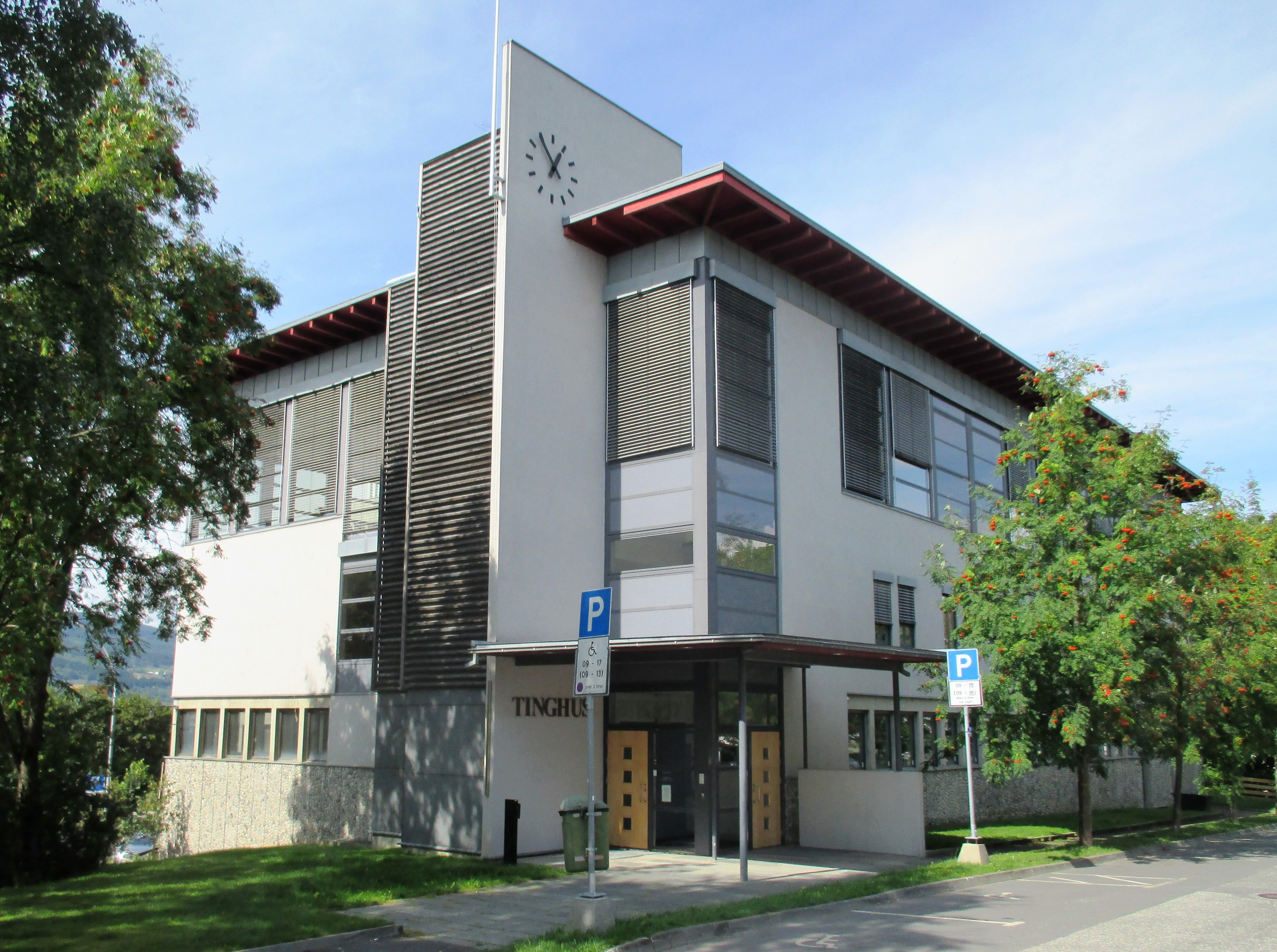
- The Courthouse of Lillehammer
- 61°07′01″N 10°28′00″E
- Established: 1731
- Dissolved: 2021
- Jurisdiction: Southern Gudbrandsdalen
- Location: Innlandet, Norway
- Coordinates: 61°07′01″N 10°28′00″E
- Appeals to: Eidsivating; Court of Appeal

Division map
- Oppland county and its court districts; Sør-Gudbrandsdal is in yellow.

Sør-Gudbrandsdal District Court (Norwegian: Sør-Gudbrandsdal tingrett) was a district court in Innlandet county, Norway. The court was based in Lillehammer. The court existed from 1731 until 2021. It served the municipalities of Gausdal, Lillehammer, Øyer, Ringebu and Sør-Fron. Cases from this court could be appealed to Eidsivating Court of Appeal.

The court was a court of first instance. Its judicial duties were mainly to settle criminal cases and to resolve civil litigation as well as bankruptcy. The administration and registration tasks of the court included death registration, issuing certain certificates, performing duties of a notary public, and officiating civil wedding ceremonies. Cases from this court were heard by a combination of professional judges and lay judges.

== History ==
The Sør-Gudbrandsdal district court was established in 1731 when the Gudbrandsdal District Court was divided into Sør-Gudbrandsdal District Court and Nord-Gudbrandsdal District Court. This court originally included Gausdal, Lillehammer, Øyer, Ringebu, and Sollia. In 1734, the court's jurisdictional area was enlarged when Fron was transferred from Nord-Gudbrandsdal District Court to this court. In 1841, a new Mellom-Gudbrandsdal District Court was established which served the municipalities of Nord-Fron, Sør-Fron, Ringebu, Sollia, and Øyer. This new court meant that Sør-Gudbrandsdal District Court would only include Lillehammer Municipality and Gausdal Municipality. In 1909, the Mellom-Gudbrandsdal District Court was abolished and the municipalities of Sør-Fron, Ringebu and Øyer returned to Sør-Gudbrandsdal District Court (Nord-Fron Municipality joined Nord-Gudbrandsdal District Court. From 1966-1977, Nord-Fron Municipality was part this court, but in 1977 it moved back to Nord-Gudbrandsdal. On 26 April 2021, this court was merged with the Nord-Gudbrandsdal District Court, Gjøvik District Court, and Valdres District Court to create the new Vestre Innlandet District Court.
