= Nord-Gudbrandsdal District Court =

Former district court in Norway

- Nord-Gudbrandsdal tingrett
- Interactive map of Nord-Gudbrandsdal; District Court
- 61°52′37″N 9°05′39″E
- Established: 1731
- Dissolved: 2021
- Jurisdiction: Northern Gudbrandsdalen
- Location: Vågåmo, Innlandet, Norway
- Coordinates: 61°52′37″N 9°05′39″E
- Appeals to: Eidsivating; Court of Appeal

Division map
- Oppland county and its court districts; Nord-Gudbrandsdal was in red.

Nord-Gudbrandsdal District Court (Norwegian: Nord-Gudbrandsdal tingrett) was a district court in Innlandet county, Norway. The court was based in Vågåmo. The court existed from 1731 until 2021. It served the municipalities of Dovre, Lesja, Lom, Nord-Fron, Sel, Skjåk, and Vågå. Cases from this court could be appealed to Eidsivating Court of Appeal.

The court was a court of first instance. Its judicial duties were mainly to settle criminal cases and to resolve civil litigation as well as bankruptcy. The administration and registration tasks of the court included death registration, issuing certain certificates, performing duties of a notary public, and officiating civil wedding ceremonies. Cases from this court were heard by a combination of professional judges and lay judges.

== History ==
The Nord-Gudbrandsdal district court was established in 1731 when the Gudbrandsdal District Court was divided into Nord-Gudbrandsdal District Court and Sør-Gudbrandsdal District Court. This court originally included cases from Lesja, Lom, Fron, and Vågå. In 1734, the court's jurisdictional area was reduced when Fron was transferred from this court to the Sør-Gudbrandsdal District Court. In 1909, the Mellom-Gudbrandsdal District Court was abolished and Nord-Fron Municipality was merged back into this court's jurisdiction. From 1966-1977, Nord-Fron Municipality was part of the Sør-Gudbrandsdal District Court, but in 1977 it was moved back (due to a municipal merger and subsequent division). On 26 April 2021, the court was merged with the Gjøvik District Court, Sør-Gudbrandsdal District Court, and Valdres District Court to create the new Vestre Innlandet District Court.
