= Vestre Innlandet District Court =

First-instance law court in Norway

- Vestre Innlandet tingrett
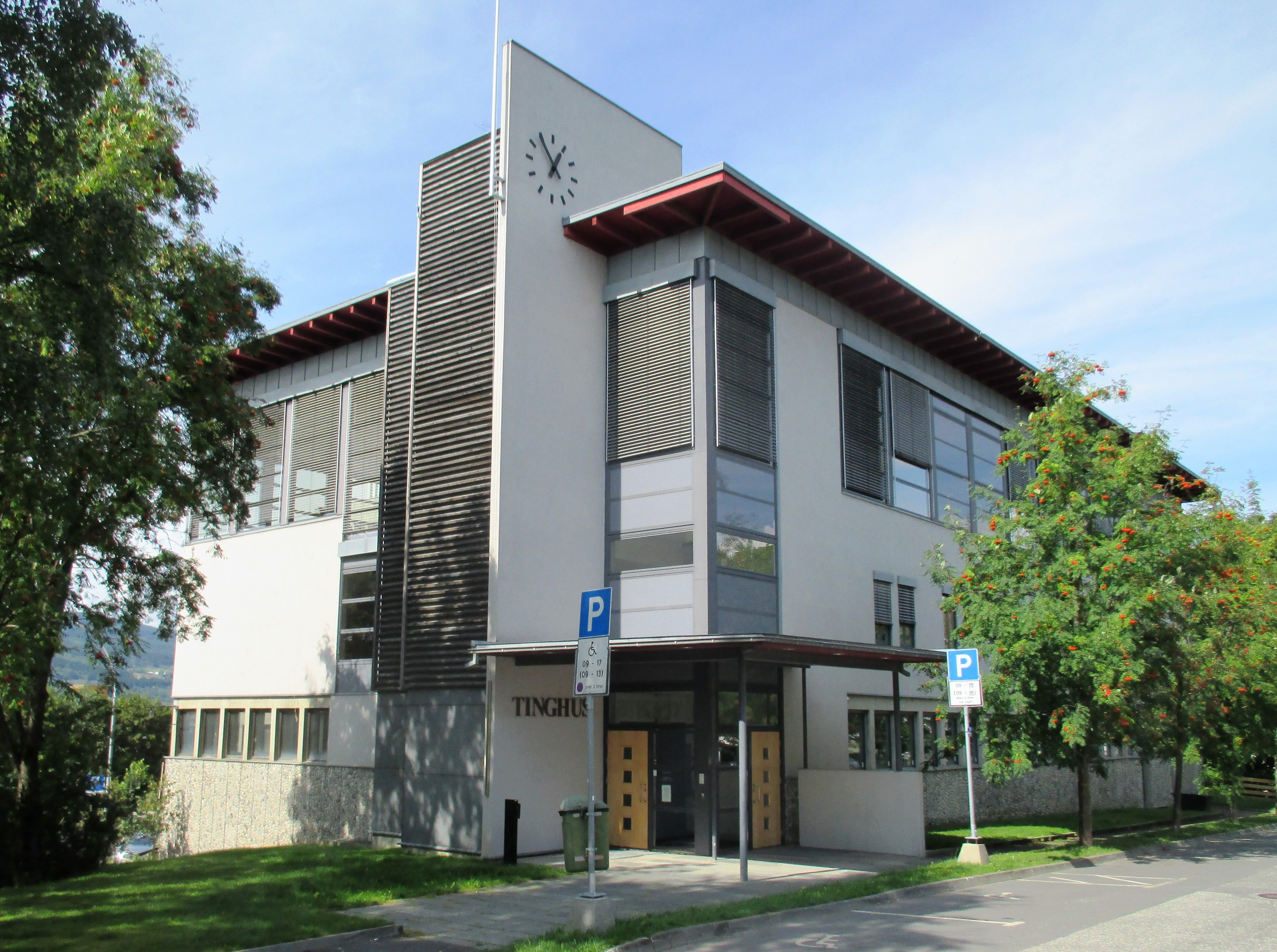
- View of the courthouse in Lillehammer
- 60°47′49″N 10°41′34″E
- Established: 26 April 2021
- Dissolved: 9 June 2025
- Jurisdiction: West Innlandet, Norway
- Location: Fagernes, Lillehammer, Gjøvik, and Vågåmo
- Coordinates: 60°47′49″N 10°41′34″E
- Appeals to: Eidsivating Court of Appeal

Vestre Innlandet District Court (Norwegian: Vestre Innlandet tingrett) was a district court located in Innlandet county, Norway. This court was based at four different courthouses which are located in Gjøvik, Fagernes, Lillehammer, and Vågåmo. The court is subordinate to the Eidsivating Court of Appeal. The court served the western part of the county which included cases from 24 municipalities as follows.

- The courthouse in Gjøvik accepted cases from the municipalities of Gjøvik, Gran, Nordre Land, Søndre Land, Vestre Toten, and Østre Toten.
- The courthouse in Lillehammer accepted cases from the municipalities of Gausdal, Lillehammer, Ringebu, Sør-Fron, and Øyer.
- The courthouse in Fagernes accepted cases from the municipalities of Etnedal, Nord-Aurdal, Sør-Aurdal, Vestre Slidre, Vang, and Øystre Slidre.
- The courthouse in Vågåmo accepted cases from the municipalities of Dovre, Lesja, Lom, Nord-Fron, Sel, Skjåk, and Vågå.

The court was led by a chief judge (sorenskriver) and several other judges. The court was a court of first instance. Its judicial duties were mainly to settle criminal cases and to resolve civil litigation as well as bankruptcy. The administration and registration tasks of the court included death registration, issuing certain certificates, performing duties of a notary public, and officiating civil wedding ceremonies. Cases from this court were heard by a combination of professional judges and lay judges. Cases from this district court could be appealed to the Eidsivating Court of Appeal.

== History ==
This court was established on 26 April 2021 after the old Gjøvik District Court, Nord-Gudbrandsdal District Court, Sør-Gudbrandsdal District Court, and Valdres District Court were all merged into one court. At the same time, Lunner Municipality which was previously under the jurisdiction of the Gjøvik District Court, was transferred to the newly established Ringerike, Asker og Bærum District Court. The new district court system continued to use the courthouses from the predecessor courts. On 9 June 2025, this court was dissolved and divided into two new courts: Gudbrandsdal District Court and Vestoppland og Valdres District Court.
