= Gjøvik District Court =

Former district court in Norway

- Gjøvik tingrett
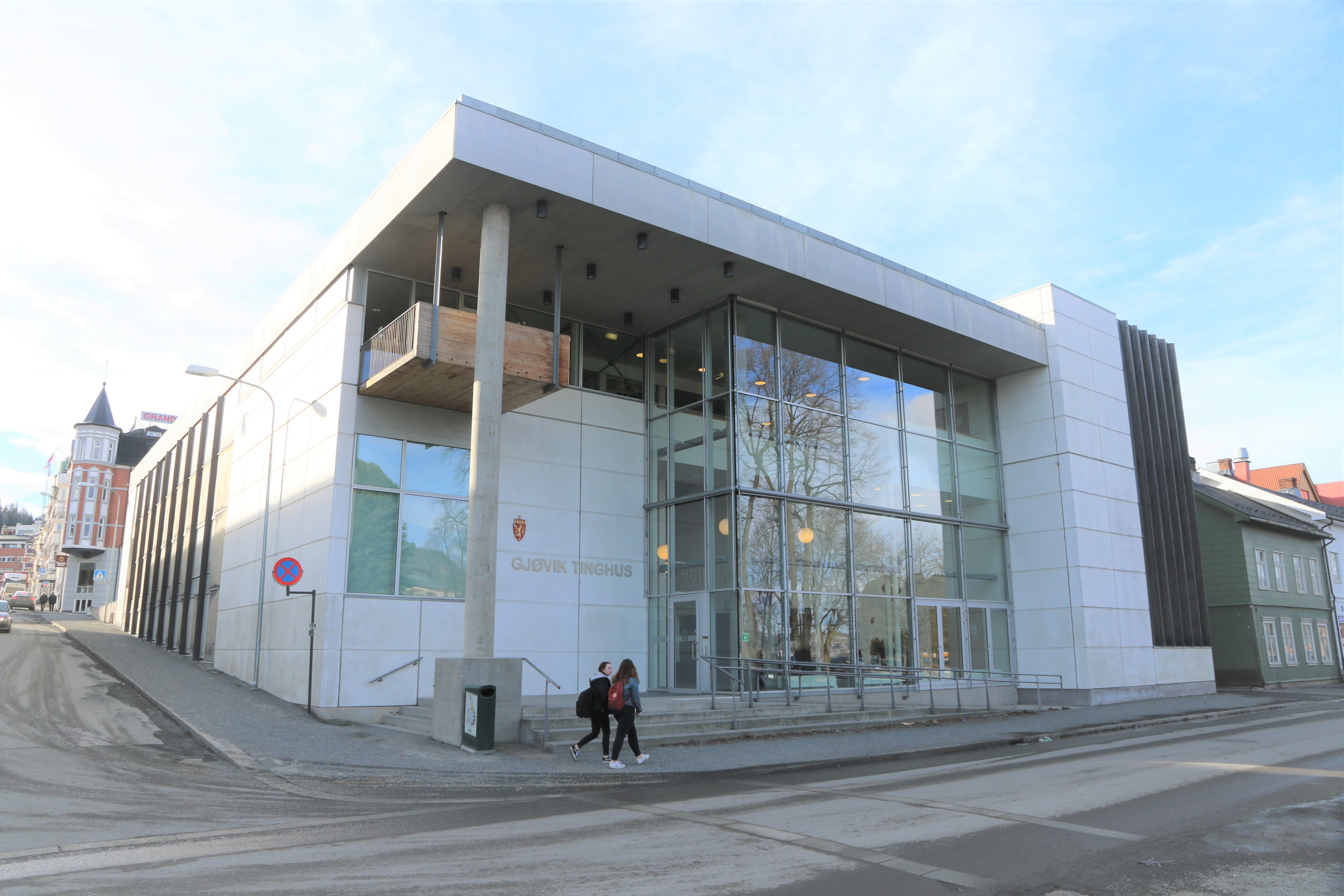
- The courthouse in Gjøvik
- 60°59′07″N 9°14′12″E
- Established: 1 Jan 2009
- Dissolved: 26 Apr 2021
- Jurisdiction: Southern Oppland
- Location: Gjøvik, Innlandet, Norway
- Coordinates: 60°59′07″N 9°14′12″E
- Appeals to: Eidsivating; Court of Appeal

Gjøvik District Court (Norwegian: Gjøvik tingrett) was a district court in Innlandet county, Norway. The court was based in Gjøvik. The court existed from 2009 until 2021. It served the municipalities of Gjøvik, Lunner, Gran, Søndre Land, Nordre Land, Østre Toten, and Vestre Toten. Cases from this court could be appealed to Eidsivating Court of Appeal.

The court was a court of first instance. Its judicial duties were mainly to settle criminal cases and to resolve civil litigation as well as bankruptcy. The administration and registration tasks of the court included death registration, issuing certain certificates, performing duties of a notary public, and officiating civil wedding ceremonies. Cases from this court were heard by a combination of professional judges and lay judges.

== History ==
The court was created on 1 January 2009, when the old Toten District Court and Hadeland og Land District Court were merged. Jevnaker Municipality was a part of the Hadeland og Land District Court prior to 2009, but on that date it was moved to the jurisdiction of the Ringerike District Court rather than joining the new Gjøvik District Court. On 26 April 2021, Gjøvik District Court was merged with the Nord-Gudbrandsdal District Court, Sør-Gudbrandsdal District Court, and Valdres District Court to create the new Vestre Innlandet District Court.
