= Hernæs =

Hernæs is a Norwegian surname. Notable people with the surname include:

- Bjørn Hernæs (1936–2024), Norwegian politician
- Egil Hernæs (1901–1961), Norwegian politician
- Kåre Hernæs (1932–2008), Norwegian table tennis player
