= Gålå =

Village in Sør-Fron Municipality, Norway

- Village
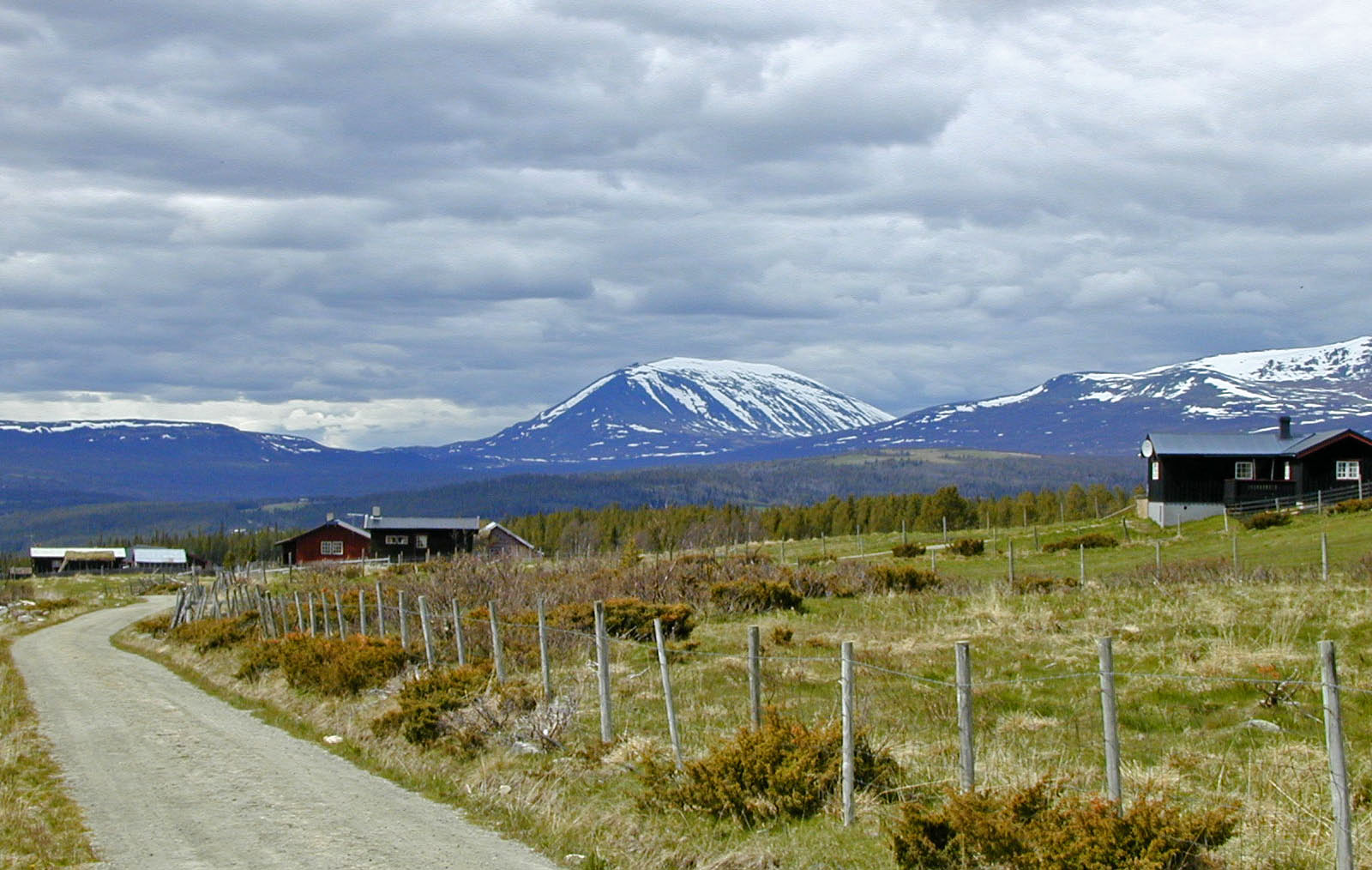
- View of the village (June 2005)
- Interactive map of Gålå
- Location within Innlandet Location within Norway
- Coordinates: 61.50571°N 9.78481°E
- Country: Norway
- Region: Eastern Norway
- County: Innlandet
- District: Gudbrandsdalen
- Municipality: Sør-Fron Municipality
- Elevation: 910 m (2,990 ft)
- Time zone: UTC+01:00 (CET)
  - Summer (DST): UTC+02:00 (CEST)
- Post Code: 2646 Gålå

Gålå is a village in Sør-Fron Municipality in Innlandet county, Norway. The village is located in the Gudbrandsdal valley, about 12 kilometres (7.5 mi) to the southwest of the village of Hundorp. Gålå is located on the eastern shore of the lake Gålåvatnet.

== Transportation ==
Gålå is located on a mountain plateau that sits about 930 metres (3,050 ft) above sea level. There are two main roads that connect Gålå to the rest of the municipality. The main road is a fully maintained road that heads north to Harpefoss. The other road is the Peer Gynt Road (Peer Gyntveien). That mountain road is only open in the summer months. The village also has a small airport, Wadahl flyplass.

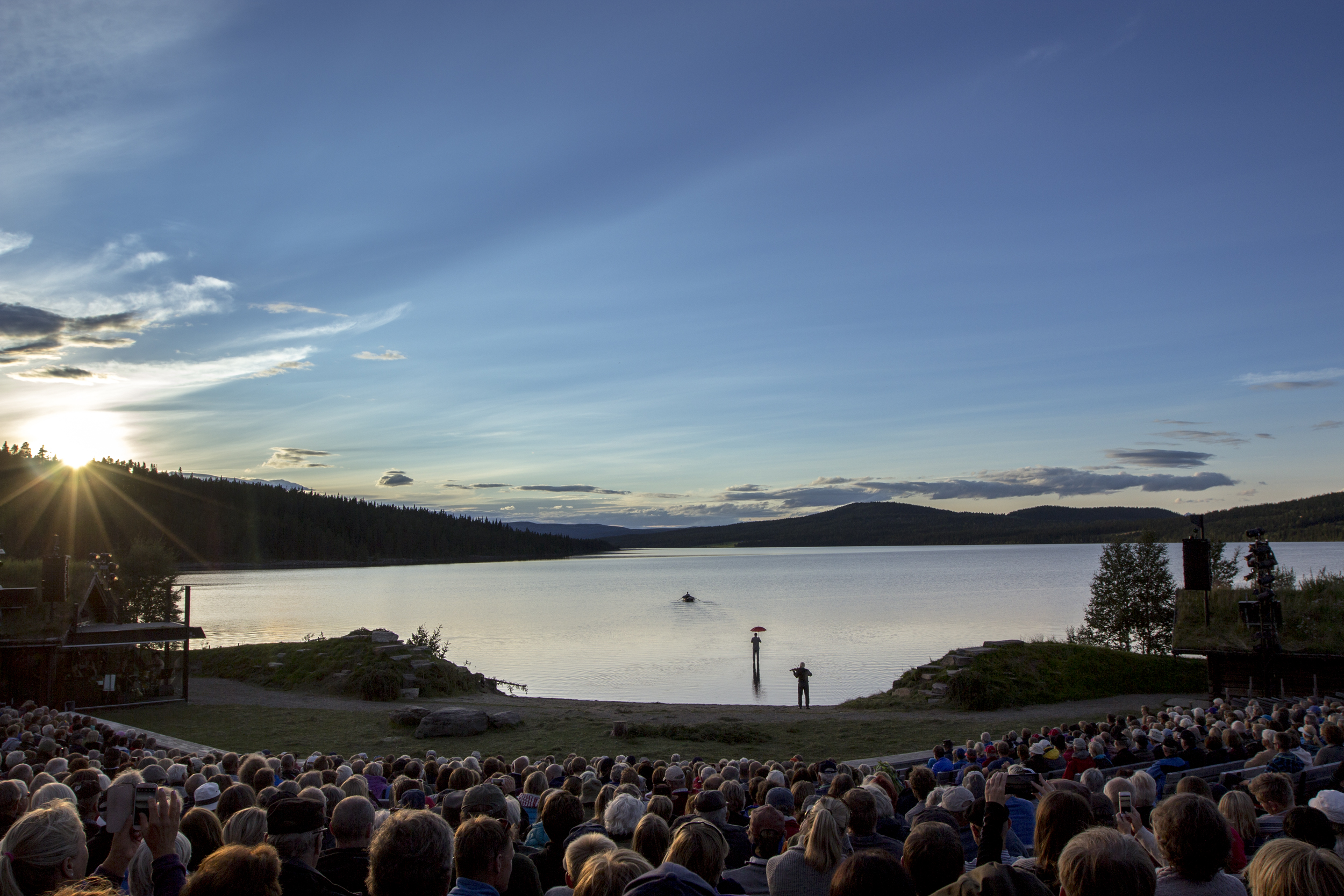
Peer Gynt Festival at Gålåvatnet

== Attractions ==
Gålå is the site of the hotels Wadahl Høgfjellshotel and Gålå Høgfjellshotell. It is also the location of Gålå Fjellgrend, a ski resort catering for both winter and summer leisure activities.

Gålå is the location of a ten-day summer cultural festival known as the Peer Gynt Festival (Peer Gynt Stemnet) set against the background of Lake Gålå (Gålåvatnet). The festival includes performances of Peer Gynt, a five-act play by the Norwegian dramatist Henrik Ibsen.

== Etymology ==
The village is named after the old Gaalaa mountain farm (the modern Norwegian spelling is Gålå). The mountain farm is named after the nearby lake Gålåvatnet. The lake is named after the river Golo. The Old Norse form of the river name was probably Gola and is then derived from the verb gola meaning "howl", "yell", or "scream". The river has a steep fall, and makes a lot of noise.
