= Egil Hernæs =

Norwegian politician (1901-1961)

Egil Ran Hernæs (17 September 1901 – 12 April 1961) was a Norwegian politician for the Labour Party.

== Career ==
Born in Fåberg Municipality as a son of an NSB stationmaster, Hernæs started his career as a deliveryman in the State Railways in 1917. He took telegraph training and worked as such from 1921 to 1946. He was also allowed to attend the Nordic folk high school in Geneva in 1935.

Hernæs was elected mayor of Sør-Fron Municipality in 1928, as Norway's youngest mayor at the time, and was re-elected as such three times before the Second World War. In 1941 he was deposed due to the German occupation of Norway. Being active in Milorg, he was subsequently imprisoned in Bredtveit concentration camp from May to September 1942, and upon release the authorities banished him from his homecounty Oppland as well as Hedmark. He therefore took up his work as a railway telegrapher at the Hedmark border, at Morskogen in Eidsvoll. Returning to Sør-Fron and the mayoral position in 1945, Hernæs was re-elected several times until his death in 1961. Having served as Sør-Fron's legitimate mayor for 33 years, Hernæs was awarded the King's Medal of Merit in gold. He also chaired Oppland county council, at the time comprising all the mayors in the county, from 1945 to 1947. Within his party, Hernæs chaired Harpefoss Labour Association and Sør-Fron Labour Party, followed by Gudbrandsdalen Labour Party from 1949 to 1953; from 1936 to 1953 he was a Labour Party national board member.

He served as a deputy representative to the Parliament of Norway from Oppland during the terms 1934–1936, 1937–1945 and 1950–1953. During the entirety of Hernæs third term, the MP Lars Magnus Moen was a part of Gerhardsen's Second Cabinet and Torp's Cabinet, causing Hernæs to move up as a regular MP. He sat on the Standing Committee on the Military. In total he met during 3 year and 334 days of parliamentary session.

After the Second World War, Hernæs was also promoted to manager in the State Railways in 1946, and finally to stationmaster at Harpefoss in 1955. He retired in 1958. He also held various public board memberships, most notably serving on the Schei Committee, for drafting a new municipal structure, from 1947 to 1960. He was also a council member of Vinmonopolet in 1950–51 and supervisory council member of Opplandskraft from 1952 to his death in 1961. He died at the age of 59 following a short-term "hopeless disease". After his death, a local fundraiser coupled with a municipal grant led to a bust of Hernæs being sculpted by Kåre Orud. It was displayed at the Autumn Exhibition in Oslo and unveiled in Hundorp in 1971.
