= Valdres District Court =

Former district court in Norway

- Valdres tingrett
- 60°59′07″N 9°14′12″E
- Established: 1786
- Dissolved: 2021
- Jurisdiction: Valdres
- Location: Fagernes, Innlandet, Norway
- Coordinates: 60°59′07″N 9°14′12″E
- Appeals to: Eidsivating; Court of Appeal

Division map
- Oppland county and its court districts; Valdres is in purple.

Valdres District Court (Norwegian: Valdres tingrett) was a district court in Innlandet county, Norway. The court was based in Fagernes. The court existed from 1786 until 2021. It served the municipalities of Etnedal, Nord-Aurdal, Sør-Aurdal, Vang, Vestre Slidre and Øystre Slidre. Cases from this court could be appealed to Eidsivating Court of Appeal.

The court was a court of first instance. Its judicial duties were mainly to settle criminal cases and to resolve civil litigation as well as bankruptcy. The administration and registration tasks of the court included death registration, issuing certain certificates, performing duties of a notary public, and officiating civil wedding ceremonies. Cases from this court were heard by a combination of professional judges and lay judges.

== History ==
On 27 January 1786, the old Hadeland, Land og Valdres District Court was divided into two: Valdres District Court and Hadeland og Land District Court. On 26 April 2021, the court was merged with the Nord-Gudbrandsdal District Court, Sør-Gudbrandsdal District Court, and Gjøvik District Court to create the new Vestre Innlandet District Court.
