= Harald Nikolai Heggen =

Norwegian judge

Harald Nikolai Heggen (23 April 1867 – 19 January 1926) was a Norwegian judge.

He was born in Aamot as a son of timber floating inspector Hans Heggen and Dorothea Sætre. In 1911 he married Mary Archer from Larvik, a daughter of the known industrialist Colin Archer. She became a notable art painter.

He finished his secondary education in 1884 and graduated from the Royal Frederick University with the cand.jur. degree in 1889. After working as a junior solicitor and deputy judge he was a secretary in the Ministry of Justice from 1894. After a period as a judge in the Congo Free State from 1897 to 1899, he returned to the Ministry of Justice where he worked until 1903. He was then appointed as an arbitrator in British Egypt. From 1913 he served for five years as a counsellor to the Supreme Court of Norway. Out of a desire of being promoted, he was appointed as district stipendiary magistrate in Sør-Gudbrandsdal District Court. In 1922 he was selected by the government to a new international tribunal in Egypt.

He died in January, 1926 in Cairo. He was decorated as a Knight, First Class of the Order of St. Olav (1910).
