= Dale-Gudbrand's farm =

Archaeological site in Norway

Coordinates: 61°32′56″N 9°57′58″E

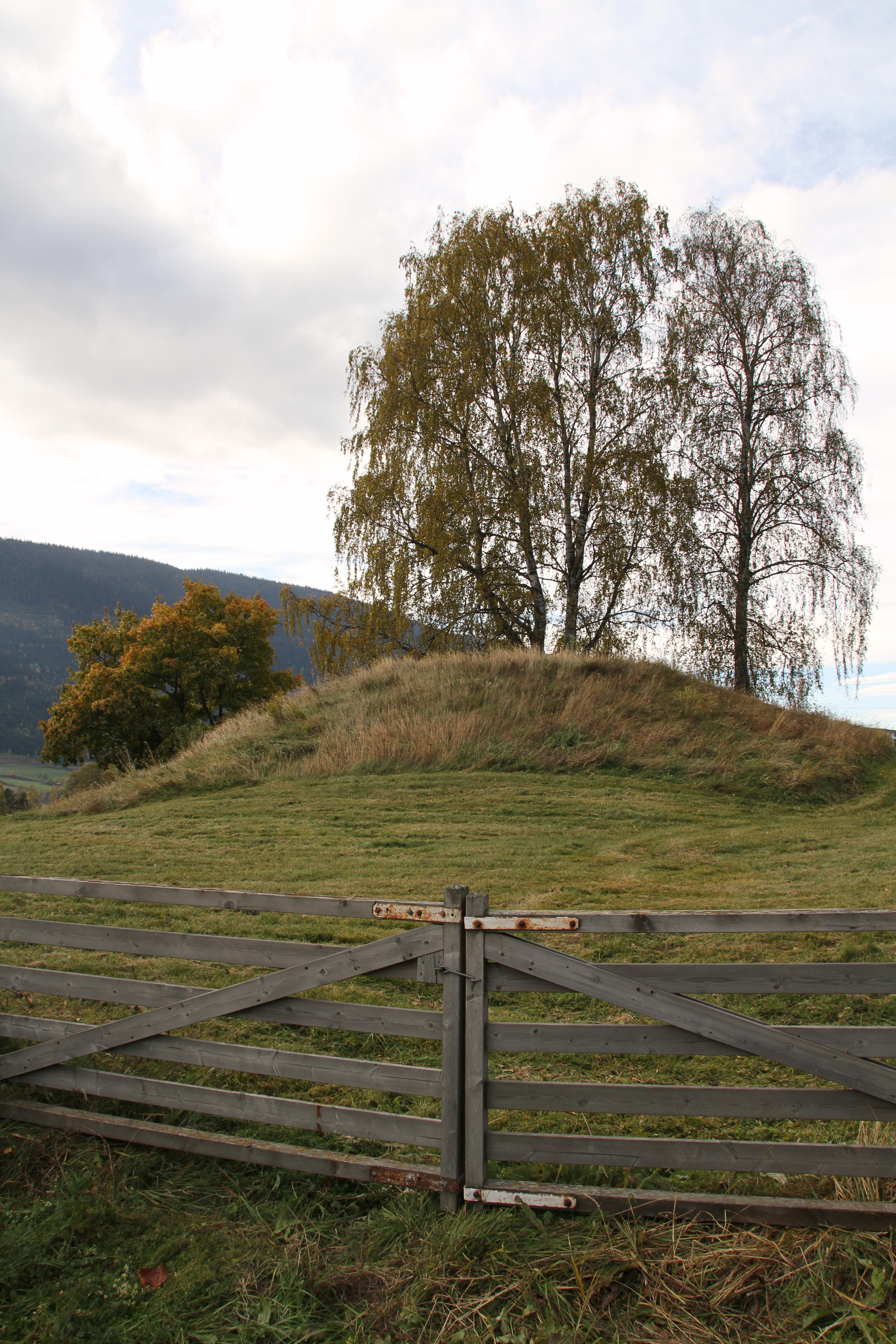
One of the grave mounds at Hundorp

Dale-Gudbrand's farm (Norwegian: Dale-Gudbrands gard) is a historical site in Hundorp in Sør-Fron Municipality in the Gudbrandsdalen valley of Eastern Norway. It was selected as the millennium site (see Millennium site) for Oppland county and for Sør-Fron Municipality in 1999. The farm lies in the middle of a major tumulus area dating back to the Iron Age. In 1755 Gerhard Schøning described five large grave mounds there as one of them was being removed. Now four of them remain; with diameters between 23 and 32 meters (75 and 105 ft), they are undoubtedly the largest in the Gudbrand Valley. In addition to the mounds, there is a square ring of stones and the remains of a round ring of stones at the site. There are also two medium-sized tumuli at the neighboring Hjetlund farm associated with the large tumuli at Hundorp.

Heimskringla, Snorri Sturluson's collection of sagas about the Norwegian kings, describes a meeting between Olaf II of Norway and the hersir Dale-Gudbrand on the farm in 1021 in chapter 113 of the Separate Saga of St. Olaf. Olaf II tricked Dale-Gudbrand and his peasant army into looking away from the idol of Thor by saying, "See, our God comes with great light!" while pointing to the sunrise in the east. At the same time, one of Olaf II's men, Kolbein the Strong, broke the statue of Thor with his club. This was the start of the introduction of Christianity into the Gudbrand Valley, and Dale-Gudbrand was later forced to build a church on his farm. The club of Kolbein the Strong is also depicted in the coat of arms of Sør-Fron.

== See also ==
- Dale-Gudbrand
