= Lia, Norway =

Village in Sør-Fron Municipality, Norway

Lia
- Village
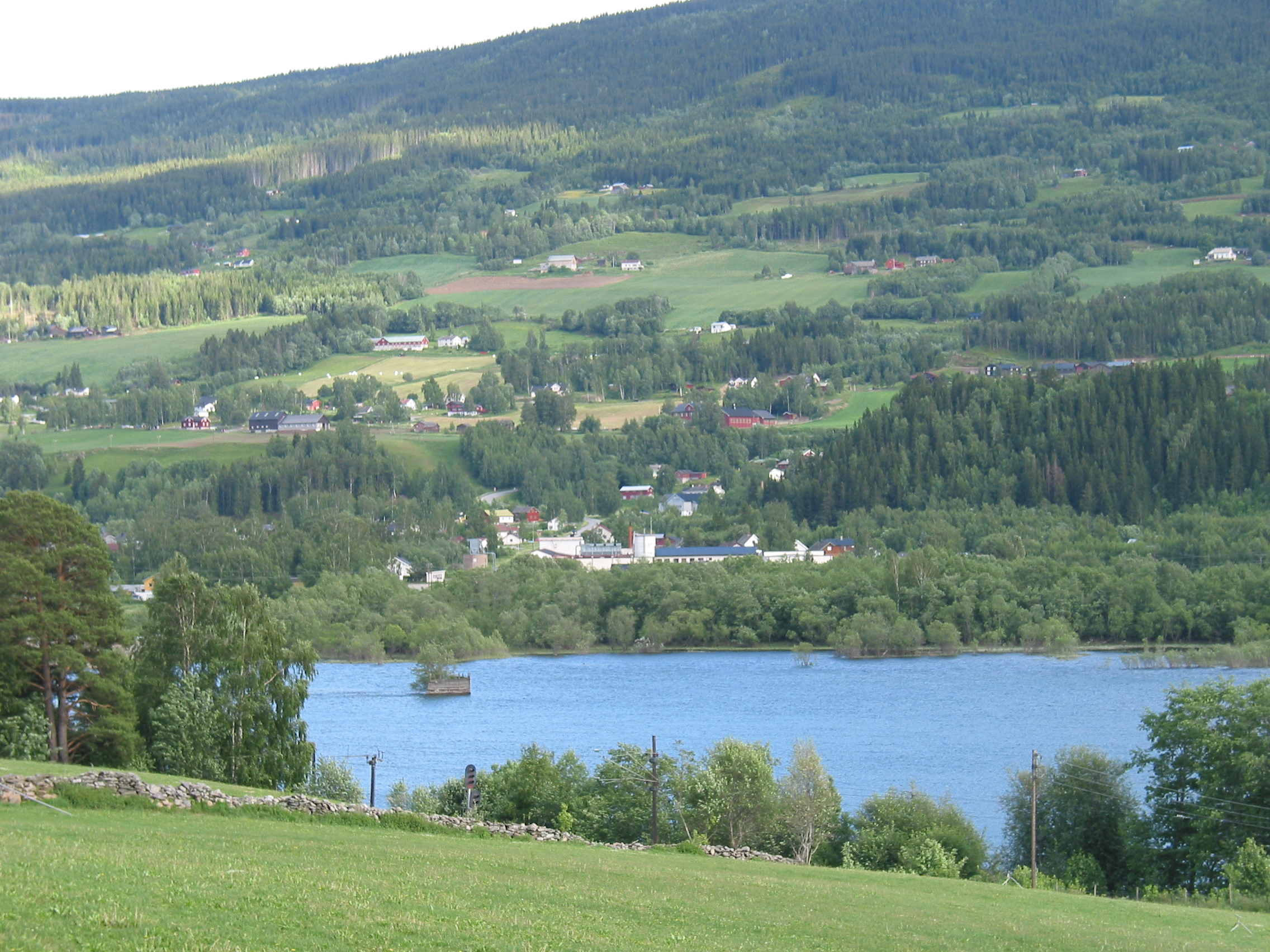
- View of the village, seen from Hundorp
- Interactive map of Lia
- Location within Innlandet Location within Norway
- Coordinates: 61.53259°N 9.94181°E
- Country: Norway
- Region: Eastern Norway
- County: Innlandet
- District: Gudbrandsdalen
- Municipality: Sør-Fron Municipality

Area
  - Total: 0.41 km^{2} (0.16 sq mi)
- Elevation: 445 m (1,460 ft)

Population (2024)
  - Total: 266
  - Density: 649/km^{2} (1,680/sq mi)
- Time zone: UTC+01:00 (CET)
  - Summer (DST): UTC+02:00 (CEST)
- Post Code: 2647 Sør-Fron

Lia is a village in Sør-Fron Municipality in Innlandet county, Norway. The village is located in the Gudbrandsdal valley along the south shore of the Gudbrandsdalslågen river, about 2 kilometres (1.2 mi) to the southeast of the village of Hundorp which lies on the other side of the river. The 0.41-square-kilometre (100-acre) village has a population (2024) of 266 and a population density of 649 inhabitants per square kilometre (1,680/sq mi).
