= Wilhelm Omsted =

Norwegian lawyer and judge (born 1939)

Wilhelm Omsted (born 24 May 1939) is a Norwegian lawyer and judge.

He graduated with the cand.jur. degree in 1967, and worked as a deputy judge in Hardanger and a secretary in the Ministry of Justice. From 1971 he was a lawyer, since 1973 in his own lawyer's firm. In 1976 he received his barrister's license, with permission to work with Supreme Court cases. From 1985 to 1988 he was a board member of the Norwegian Bar Association. In 1988 he became a presiding judge in Eidsivating Court of Appeal. When Borgarting Court of Appeal was created out of Eidsivating in 1995, he became a presiding judge there. He has also held lectures at the University of Oslo.

He resides in Frogner.
