= Sør-Fron Municipality =

Municipality in Innlandet, Norway

Sør-Fron Municipality Sør-Fron kommune
- Municipality
- Søndre Fron herred (historic name)
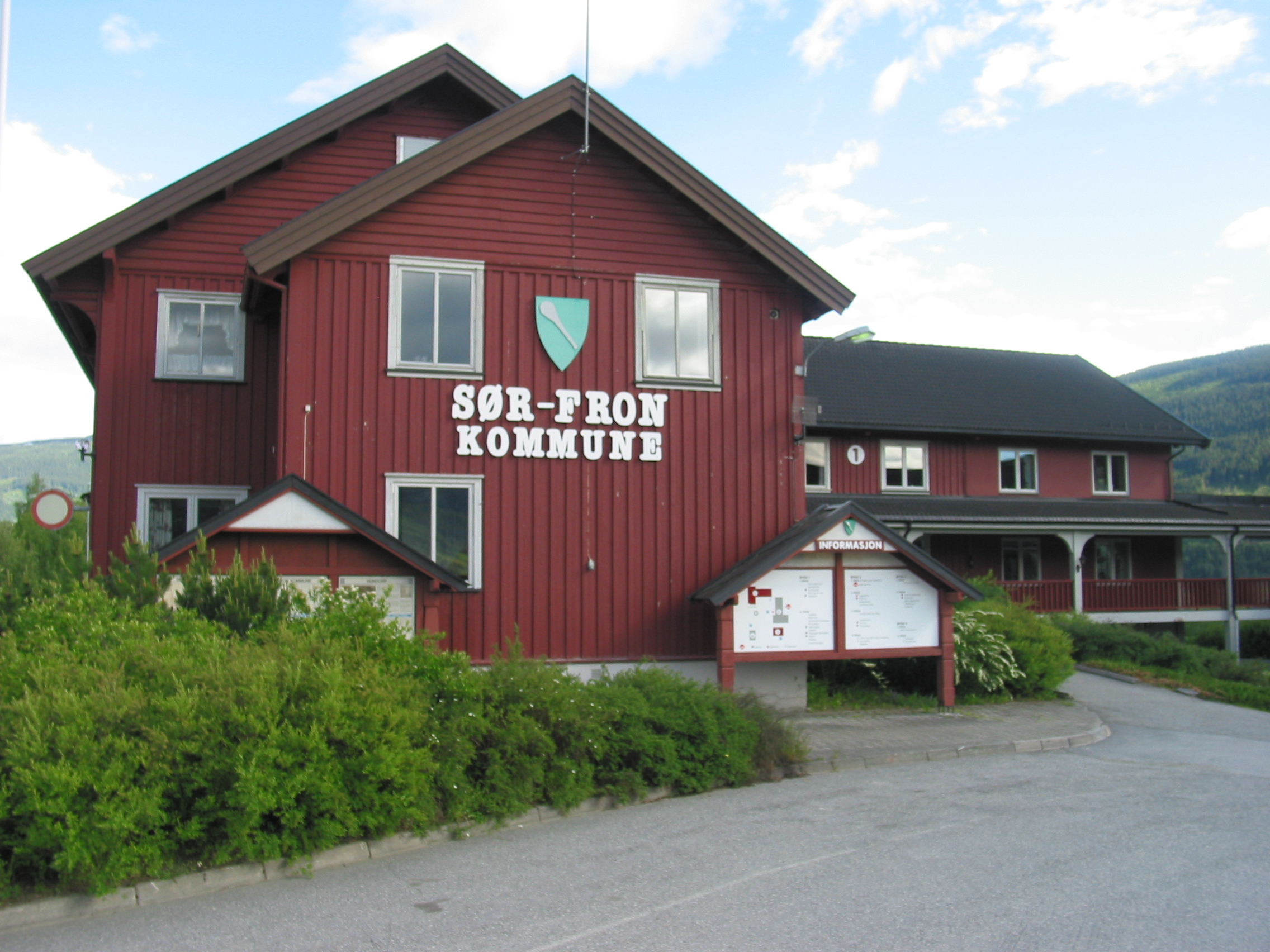
- View of the municipal building in Hundorp

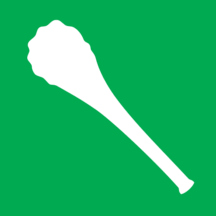
- Flag Coat of arms

- Innlandet within Norway

- Sør-Fron within Innlandet
- Coordinates: 61°34′8″N 9°55′24″E
- Country: Norway
- County: Innlandet
- District: Gudbrandsdal
- Established: 1 Jan 1851
  - Preceded by: Fron Municipality
- Disestablished: 1 Jan 1966
  - Succeeded by: Fron Municipality
- Re-established: 1 Jan 1977
  - Preceded by: Fron Municipality
- Administrative centre: Hundorp

Government
  - Mayor (2011): Ole Tvete Muriteigen (Sp)

Area
  - Total: 742.2 km^{2} (286.6 sq mi)
  - Land: 711.56 km^{2} (274.73 sq mi)
  - Water: 30.65 km^{2} (11.83 sq mi) 4.1%
  - Rank: #153 in Norway
- Highest elevation: 1,580.28 m (5,184.6 ft)

Population (2025)
  - Total: 3,128
  - Rank: #225 in Norway
  - Density: 4.2/km^{2} (11/sq mi)
  - Change (10 years): ▼ −2.3%
- Demonym: Frøning

Official language
  - Norwegian form: Neutral
- Time zone: UTC+01:00 (CET)
  - Summer (DST): UTC+02:00 (CEST)
- ISO 3166 code: NO-3438
- Website: Official website

Sør-Fron is a municipality in Innlandet county, Norway. It is located in the traditional district of Gudbrandsdal. The administrative centre of the municipality is the village of Hundorp. Other villages in the municipality include Gålå, Harpefoss, and Lia.

The 742-square-kilometre (286 sq mi) municipality is the 153rd largest by area out of the 357 municipalities in Norway. Sør-Fron Municipality is the 225th most populous municipality in Norway with a population of 3,128. The municipality's population density is 4.2 inhabitants per square kilometre (11/sq mi) and its population has decreased by 2.3% over the previous 10-year period.

== General information ==
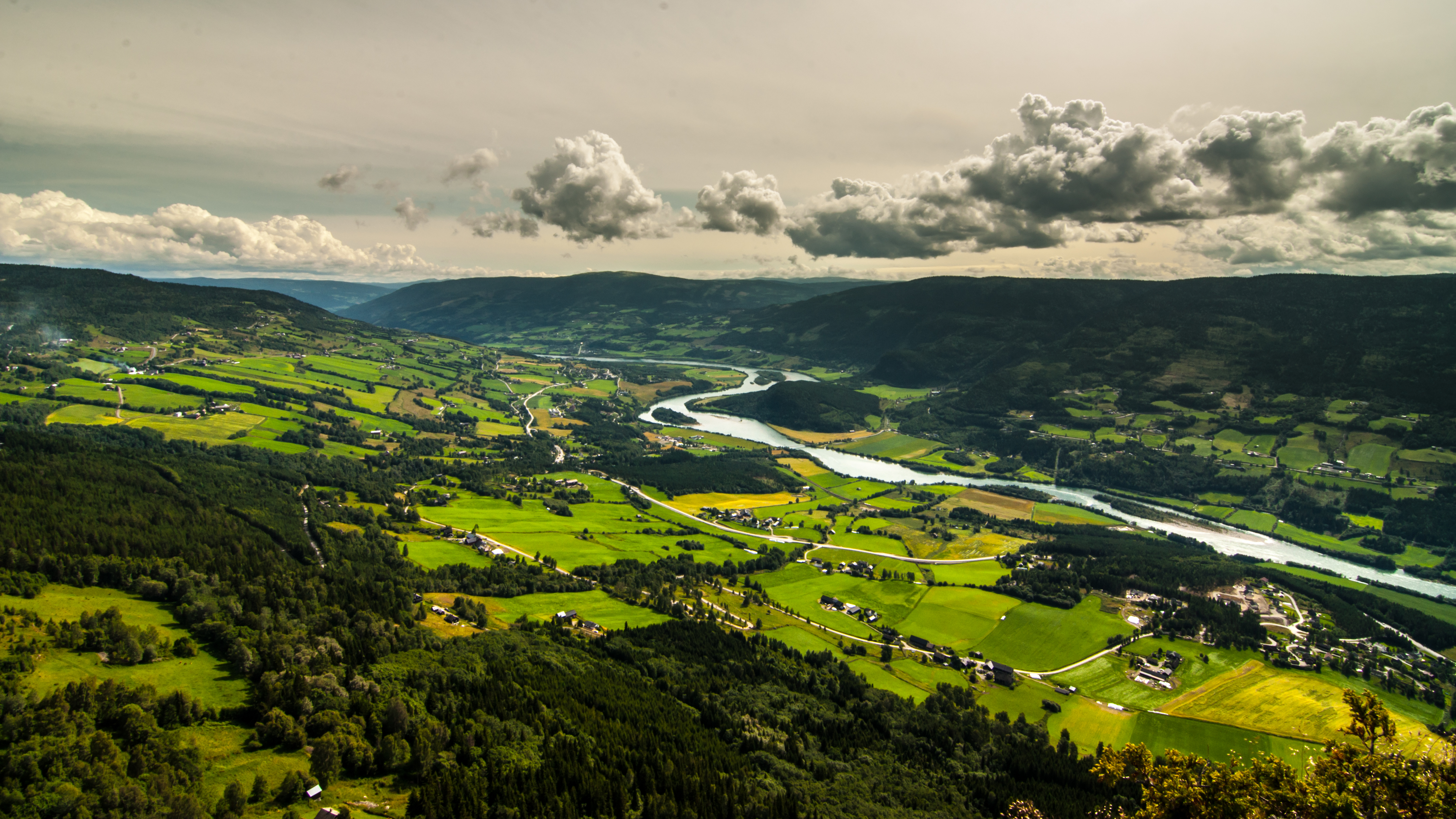
Panoramic view over Sør-Fron from Skutelen

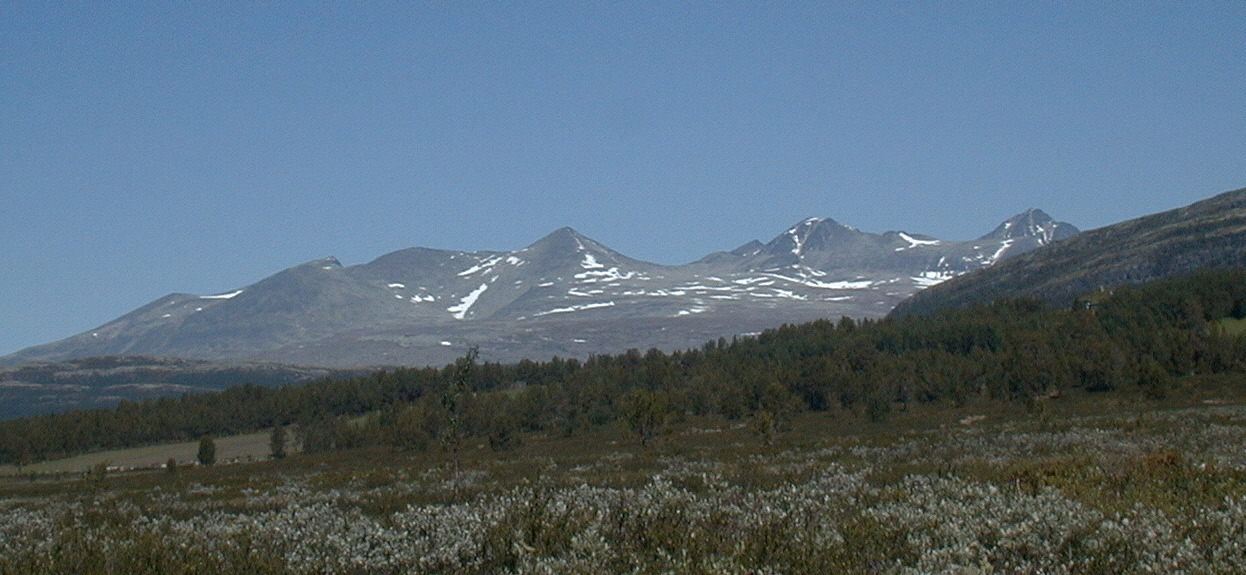
Smiubelgen in Rondane National Park

Fron Municipality was established on 1 January 1838, when the new formannskapsdistrikt law came into force. On 1 January 1851, the municipality was divided in two: the northwestern part became Nord-Fron Municipality, with a population of 4,685, while the southeastern part became Sør-Fron Municipality, with a population of 3,421. On 27 July 1956, a small area of Sør-Fron Municipality, with seven residents, was transferred to the neighbouring Vestre Gausdal Municipality.

During the 1960s, many municipal mergers took place across Norway as a result of the work of the Schei Committee. On 1 January 1966, Nord-Fron Municipality, with 5,758 inhabitants, and Sør-Fron Municipality, with 3,648 inhabitants, were merged to form a new Fron Municipality. Its borders were broadly similar to those of the old Fron Municipality that had existed from 1838 to 1851, except that the Sjoa area had been transferred from Nord-Fron Municipality to Sel Municipality.

The 1966 merger was not widely supported among residents of the new municipality. On 1 January 1977, the merger was reversed, and Nord-Fron Municipality, with a population of 6,131, and Sør-Fron Municipality, with a population of 3,509, were re-established along their 1965 borders.

Historically, Sør-Fron belonged to the former Oppland county. On 1 January 2020, the municipality became part of the newly created Innlandet county, formed through the merger of Hedmark and Oppland.

=== Name ===
The municipality, originally the parish, is named after the old Fron farm, recorded in Old Norse as Frón, since the first Fron Church was built there. The first element is sør, meaning "southern". The final element is uncertain, but may derive from frón, meaning "earth" or "land". The name therefore refers to the southern part of Fron, after the parish was divided in 1851 into northern and southern sections. Historically, the municipality was called Søndre Fron, using another word meaning "south". The name was also spelled Søndre Fron until 3 November 1917, when a royal resolution changed the official spelling to Sør-Fron.

=== Coat of arms ===
The coat of arms was granted on 4 March 1988. The official blazon is "Vert, a club argent in bend" (Norwegian: På grøn grunn ei skråstilt sølv klubbe). This means that the arms have a green field, or background, and that the charge is a club placed diagonally. The club has a tincture of argent, which is usually shown as white, or as silver when metal is used.

The club refers to the weapon associated with Kolbein Sterke in the account of the meeting between King Olav Haraldsson, the people of Fron and Dale-Gudbrand at Hundorp in 1021. The episode is recorded by Snorre Sturlusson. According to the saga account, King Olav directed attention to the rising sun while saying that their god was coming with light. As Dale-Gudbrand and the farmers looked toward the sun, Kolbein used the club to break the statue of Thor that stood at Hundorp. Snorre presents the event as leading to the Christianisation of the local population. The arms were designed by Amund Rudi. The municipal flag has the same design as the coat of arms.

=== Churches ===
The Church of Norway has one parish, or sokn, within Sør-Fron Municipality. It is part of the Sør-Gudbrandsdal prosti, or deanery, in the Diocese of Hamar.

Churches in Sør-Fron Municipality
Parish (sokn)	Church name	Location of the church	Year built
Sør-Frøn	Sør-Fron Church	Hundorp	1792
Sør-Frøn	Espedalen Chapel	Espedalen	1974

== Government ==
Sør-Fron Municipality is responsible for primary education (through 10th grade), outpatient health services, senior citizen services, welfare and other social services, zoning, economic development, and municipal roads and utilities. The municipality is governed by a municipal council of directly elected representatives. The mayor is indirectly elected by a vote of the municipal council. The municipality is under the jurisdiction of the Gudbrandsdal District Court and the Eidsivating Court of Appeal.

=== Municipal council ===
The municipal council (Kommunestyre) of Sør-Fron Municipality is made up of 19 representatives that are elected to four year terms. The tables below show the current and historical composition of the council by political party.

Sør-Fron kommunestyre 2023–2027
Party name (in Norwegian)	Number of representatives
Labour Party (Arbeiderpartiet)	6
Conservative Party (Høyre)	2
Centre Party (Senterpartiet)	9
Sør-Fron Local List (Sør-Fron Bygdaliste)	2
Total number of members:	19

Sør-Fron kommunestyre 2019–2023
Party name (in Norwegian)	Number of representatives
Labour Party (Arbeiderpartiet)	6
Conservative Party (Høyre)	1
Centre Party (Senterpartiet)	10
Sør-Fron Local List (Sør-Fron Bygdaliste)	2
Total number of members:	19

Sør-Fron kommunestyre 2015–2019
Party name (in Norwegian)	Number of representatives
Labour Party (Arbeiderpartiet)	9
Centre Party (Senterpartiet)	8
Sør-Fron Local List (Sør-Fron Bygdeliste)	2
Total number of members:	19

Sør-Fron kommunestyre 2011–2015
Party name (in Norwegian)	Number of representatives
Labour Party (Arbeiderpartiet)	9
Conservative Party (Høyre)	1
Centre Party (Senterpartiet)	5
Sør-Fron Local List (Sør-Fron Bygdeliste)	4
Total number of members:	19

Sør-Fron kommunestyre 2007–2011
Party name (in Norwegian)	Number of representatives
Labour Party (Arbeiderpartiet)	12
Conservative Party (Høyre)	1
Centre Party (Senterpartiet)	6
Total number of members:	19

Sør-Fron kommunestyre 2003–2007
Party name (in Norwegian)	Number of representatives
Labour Party (Arbeiderpartiet)	11
Conservative Party (Høyre)	2
Centre Party (Senterpartiet)	6
Total number of members:	19

Sør-Fron kommunestyre 1999–2003
Party name (in Norwegian)	Number of representatives
Labour Party (Arbeiderpartiet)	10
Conservative Party (Høyre)	1
Centre Party (Senterpartiet)	7
Sør-Fron Local List (Sør-Fron Bygdeliste)	1
Total number of members:	19

Sør-Fron kommunestyre 1995–1999
Party name (in Norwegian)	Number of representatives
Labour Party (Arbeiderpartiet)	11
Conservative Party (Høyre)	1
Centre Party (Senterpartiet)	6
Local list for Sør-Fron (Bygdalista i Sør-Fron)	1
Total number of members:	19

Sør-Fron kommunestyre 1991–1995
Party name (in Norwegian)	Number of representatives
Labour Party (Arbeiderpartiet)	11
Conservative Party (Høyre)	1
Centre Party (Senterpartiet)	5
Local list for Sør-Fron (Bygdalista i Sør-Fron)	2
Total number of members:	19

Sør-Fron kommunestyre 1987–1991
Party name (in Norwegian)	Number of representatives
Labour Party (Arbeiderpartiet)	12
Conservative Party (Høyre)	1
Centre Party (Senterpartiet)	3
Local list for Sør-Fron (Bygdalista i Sør-Fron)	3
Total number of members:	19

Sør-Fron kommunestyre 1983–1987
Party name (in Norwegian)	Number of representatives
Labour Party (Arbeiderpartiet)	13
Conservative Party (Høyre)	2
Centre Party (Senterpartiet)	4
Total number of members:	19

Sør-Fron kommunestyre 1979–1983
Party name (in Norwegian)	Number of representatives
Labour Party (Arbeiderpartiet)	13
Conservative Party (Høyre)	2
Centre Party (Senterpartiet)	4
Total number of members:	19

Sør-Fron kommunestyre 1963–1965
Party name (in Norwegian)	Number of representatives
Labour Party (Arbeiderpartiet)	11
Centre Party (Senterpartiet)	6
Total number of members:	17
Note: On 1 January 1966, Nord-Fron Municipality and Sør-Fron Municipality were merged into Fron Municipality. This merger only lasted until 1 January 1977 when the merger was reversed.

Sør-Fron herredsstyre 1959–1963
Party name (in Norwegian)	Number of representatives
Labour Party (Arbeiderpartiet)	11
Centre Party (Senterpartiet)	6
Total number of members:	17

Sør-Fron herredsstyre 1955–1959
Party name (in Norwegian)	Number of representatives
Labour Party (Arbeiderpartiet)	11
Farmers' Party (Bondepartiet)	5
Liberal Party (Venstre)	1
Total number of members:	17

Sør-Fron herredsstyre 1951–1955
Party name (in Norwegian)	Number of representatives
Labour Party (Arbeiderpartiet)	11
Farmers' Party (Bondepartiet)	4
Liberal Party (Venstre)	1
Total number of members:	16

Sør-Fron herredsstyre 1947–1951
Party name (in Norwegian)	Number of representatives
Labour Party (Arbeiderpartiet)	11
Farmers' Party (Bondepartiet)	4
Joint list of the Liberal Party (Venstre) and the Radical People's Party (Radikale Folkepartiet)	1
Total number of members:	16

Sør-Fron herredsstyre 1945–1947
Party name (in Norwegian)	Number of representatives
Labour Party (Arbeiderpartiet)	10
Farmers' Party (Bondepartiet)	3
Local List(s) (Lokale lister)	3
Total number of members:	16

Sør-Fron herredsstyre 1937–1940*
Party name (in Norwegian)	Number of representatives
Labour Party (Arbeiderpartiet)	11
Farmers' Party (Bondepartiet)	5
Total number of members:	16
Note: Due to the German occupation of Norway during World War II, no elections were held for new municipal councils until after the war ended in 1945.

=== Mayors ===
The mayor (Norwegian: ordfører) of Sør-Fron Municipality is the political leader of the municipality and the chairperson of the municipal council. Here is a list of people who have held this position († denotes dying in office):

- 1851–1851: Peder Nilsen
- 1852–1853: Østen Nørstegaard
- 1853–1856: Niels Forseth
- 1857–1865: Peder Nilsen
- 1866–1870: Knud B. Forr
- 1870–1870: Johan Bø
- 1871–1877: Knud B. Forr
- 1878–1883: Iver Isum
- 1884–1885: J. Bjerke
- 1886–1894: Anton Kongsli
- 1894–1895: Ivar Steig
- 1896–1897: Anton Kongsli
- 1898–1901: Thorvald Isum
- 1902–1904: Anton Kongsli
- 1905–1910: Ivar Steig
- 1911–1913: Even Sveipe (V)
- 1914–1919: Ivar Ivarsen Fosse
- 1920–1922: Ole Kjorstad
- 1923–1925: Anton O. Ringdal
- 1926–1928: Olaf Listad (Bp)
- 1929–1941: Egil Hernæs (Ap)
- 1942–1945: Aksel Bjerke (NS)
- 1945–1961: Egil Hernæs (Ap)†
- 1962–1963: Asbjørn Fevolden (Ap)
- 1964–1965: Iver Malerbakken (Ap)
- (1966–1977: part of Fron Municipality)
- 1977–1983: Jon Tofte (Ap)
- 1983–1991: Arne Hernæs (Ap)
- 1991–1995: Torstein Rudihagen (Ap)
- 1995–1999: Willy Heimstad (Ap)
- 1999–2011: Aksel Eng (Ap)†
- 2011–2011: Laila Nyhus Toppen (Ap)
- 2011–present: Ole Tvete Muriteigen (Sp)

== Geography ==
Number of minorities (1st and 2nd generation) in Sør-Fron by country of origin in 2017
Ancestry	Number
Lithuania	85
Poland	37
Bosnia-Herzegovina	32
Denmark	18
Netherlands	16

Sør-Fron Municipality is bordered to the west by Nord-Fron Municipality, to the southwest by Øystre Slidre Municipality, to the south by Gausdal Municipality, to the east by Ringebu Municipality and Stor-Elvdal Municipality, and to the north by Folldal Municipality. The river Gudbrandsdalslågen runs through the central part of the municipality.

The lakes Atnsjøen, Olstappen, and Vinstervatna are located in the municipality. The municipality includes parts of the Gudbrandsdalen and Espedalen valleys. The highest point in the municipality is the 1,580.28-metre (5,184.6 ft) tall mountain Blåkollen.

=== Rondane National Park ===
Rondane National Park, which lies partially in Sør-Fron, was the first Norwegian National Park, established in 1962. In 2003, Rondane National Park was enlarged and smaller areas of nature protection were opened or enlarged adjacent to the park.

== Culture ==
The famous play Peer Gynt is staged annually at Lake Gålå in a mountainous region of Sør-Fron as part of a festival. The play itself is supposed to have been set in a Norwegian location such as Gålå.

== Notable people ==
- Dale-Gudbrand (1100s), a historical Norwegian Hersir who lived at a farm in Hundorp
- Ludvig Holberg, Baron of Holberg (1684–1754), a writer, philosopher, historian, and playwright who was brought up in Sør-Fron
- Andreas Brandrud (1868 in Sør-Fron – 1957), a professor, theologian, and church historian
- Oddvar Nygaard (1919 in Hundorp – 1985), an accordionist and composer
