= Vestoppland and Valdres District Court =

First-instance law court in Norway

- Vestoppland og Valdres tingrett
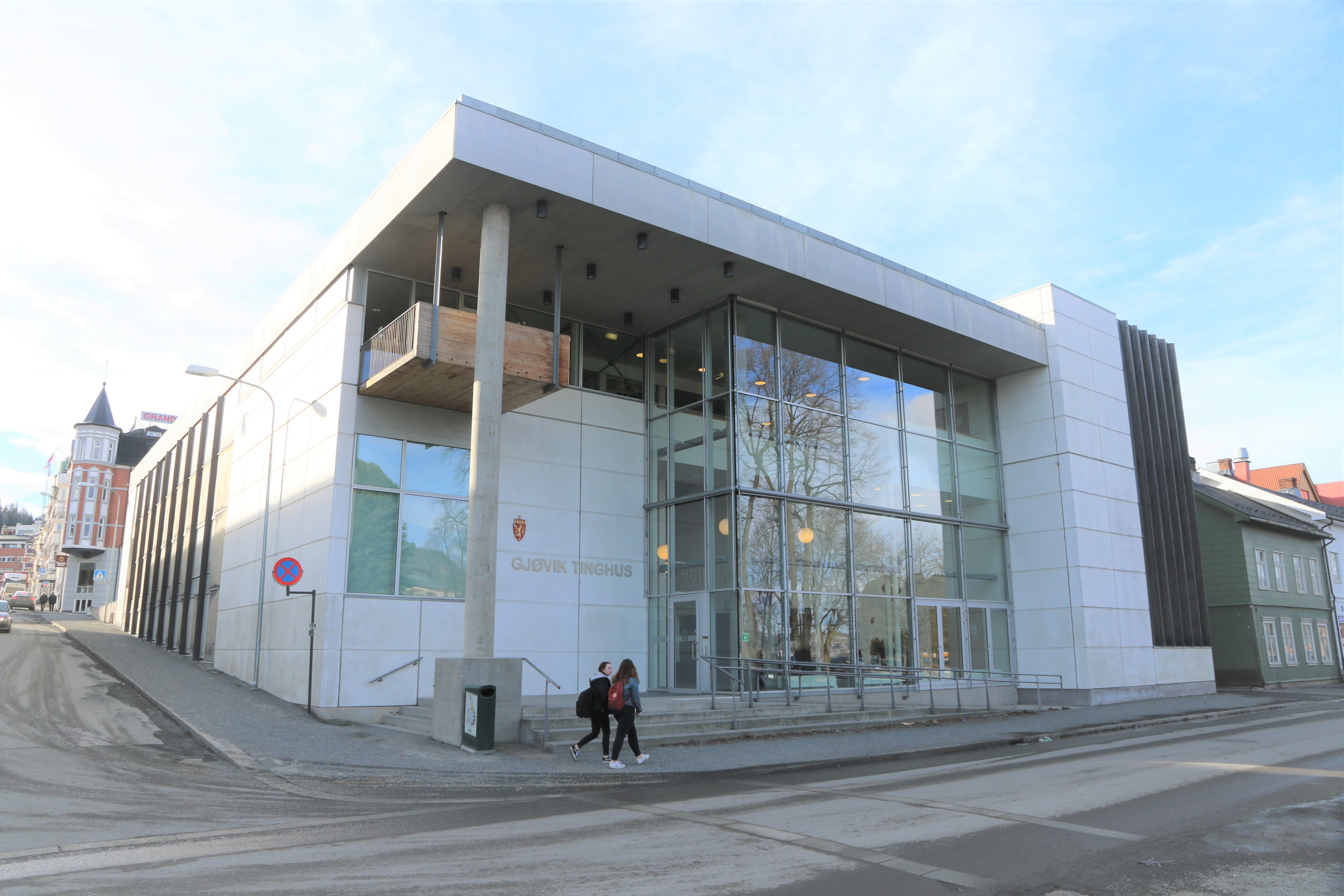
- View of the courthouse in Gjøvik
- Interactive map of Vestoppland and Valdres; District Court
- 60°47′49″N 10°41′34″E
- Established: 10 June 2025
- Jurisdiction: Vestoppland and Valdres, Norway
- Location: Fagernes and Gjøvik
- Coordinates: 60°47′49″N 10°41′34″E
- Appeals to: Eidsivating Court of Appeal
- Website: Official website

Vestoppland and Valdres District Court (Norwegian: Vestoppland og Valdres tingrett) is a district court located in Innlandet county, Norway. This court is based at two different courthouses which are located in Gjøvik and Fagernes. The court is subordinate to the Eidsivating Court of Appeal. The court serves the Vestoppland and Valdres parts of the county which includes cases from 12 municipalities as follows.

- The courthouse in Gjøvik accepts cases from the municipalities of Gjøvik, Gran, Nordre Land, Søndre Land, Vestre Toten, and Østre Toten.
- The courthouse in Fagernes accepts cases from the municipalities of Etnedal, Nord-Aurdal, Sør-Aurdal, Vang, Vestre Slidre, and Øystre Slidre.

The court is led by a chief judge (sorenskriver) and several other judges. The court is a court of first instance. Its judicial duties are mainly to settle criminal cases and to resolve civil litigation as well as bankruptcy. The administration and registration tasks of the court include death registration, issuing certain certificates, performing duties of a notary public, and officiating civil wedding ceremonies. Cases from this court are heard by a combination of professional judges and lay judges. Cases from this district court can be appealed to the Eidsivating Court of Appeal.

== History ==
This court was established on 10 June 2025 after the old Vestre Innlandet District Court was divided into two courts: Vestoppland og Valdres District Court and Gudbrandsdal District Court. The new district courts continued to use the courthouses from the predecessor court.
