= Espedalen Church =

Church in Innlandet, Norway

- Espedalen fjellkirke
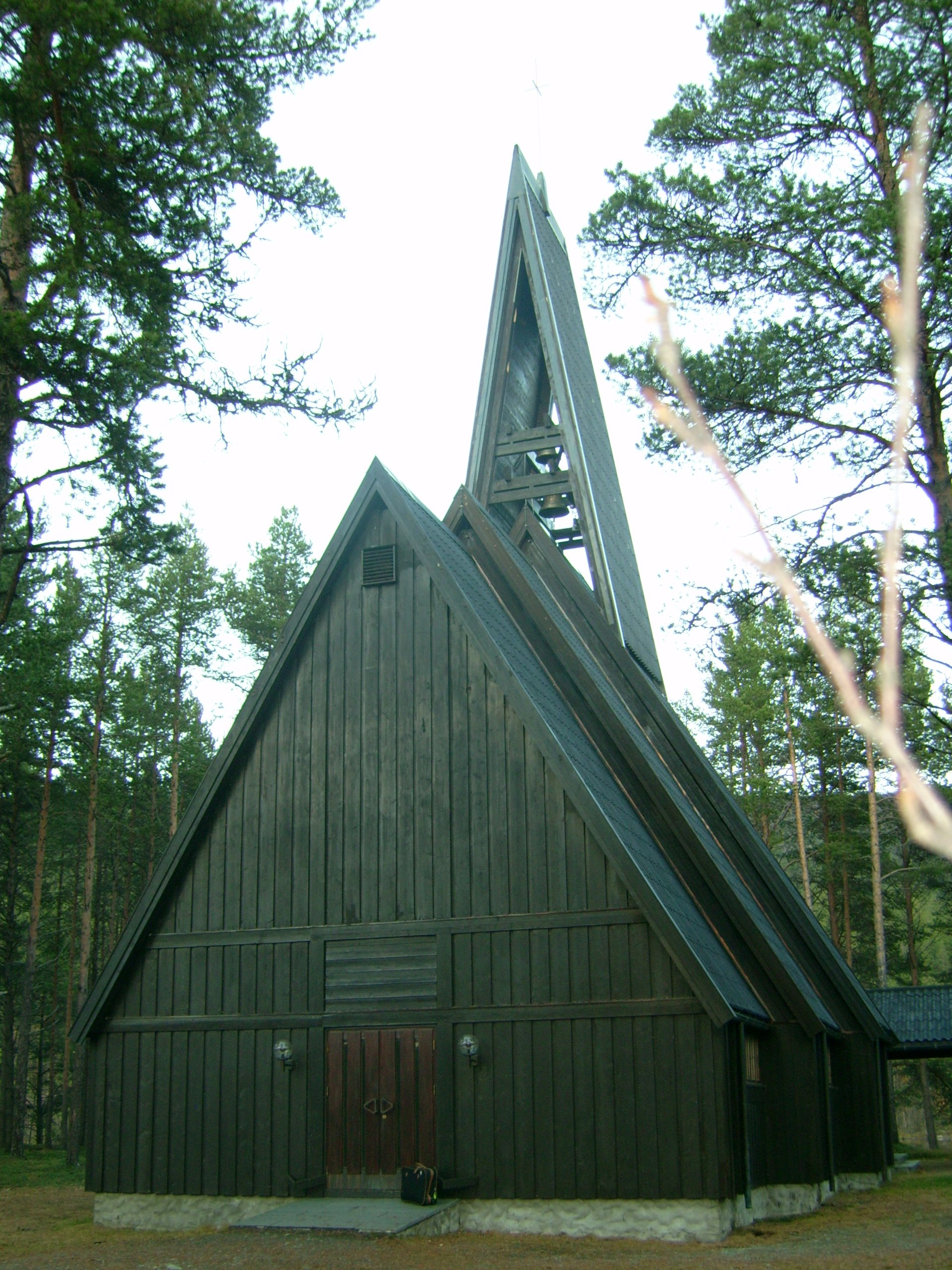
- View of the church
- Espedalen Church
- 61°26′08″N 9°29′43″E
- Location: Sør-Fron Municipality, Innlandet
- Country: Norway
- Denomination: Church of Norway
- Churchmanship: Evangelical Lutheran

History
- Status: Parish church
- Founded: 1974
- Consecrated: 1974

Architecture
- Functional status: Active
- Architect: Bjarne Bystad Ellefsen
- Architectural type: Long church
- Completed: 1974 (52 years ago)

Specifications
- Capacity: 130
- Materials: Wood

Administration
- Diocese: Hamar bispedømme
- Deanery: Sør-Gudbrandsdal prosti
- Parish: Sør-Fron

Espedalen Church (Norwegian: Espedalen fjellkirke) is a parish church of the Church of Norway in Sør-Fron Municipality in Innlandet county, Norway. It is located in the Espedalen valley, at Verksodden. It is one of the churches for the Sør-Fron parish which is part of the Sør-Gudbrandsdal prosti (deanery) in the Diocese of Hamar. The brown, wooden church was built in a long church design in 1974 using plans drawn up by the architect Bjarne Bystad Ellefsen. The church seats about 130 people.

== See also ==
- List of churches in Hamar
