= Espedalen =

Valley in Innlandet, Norway

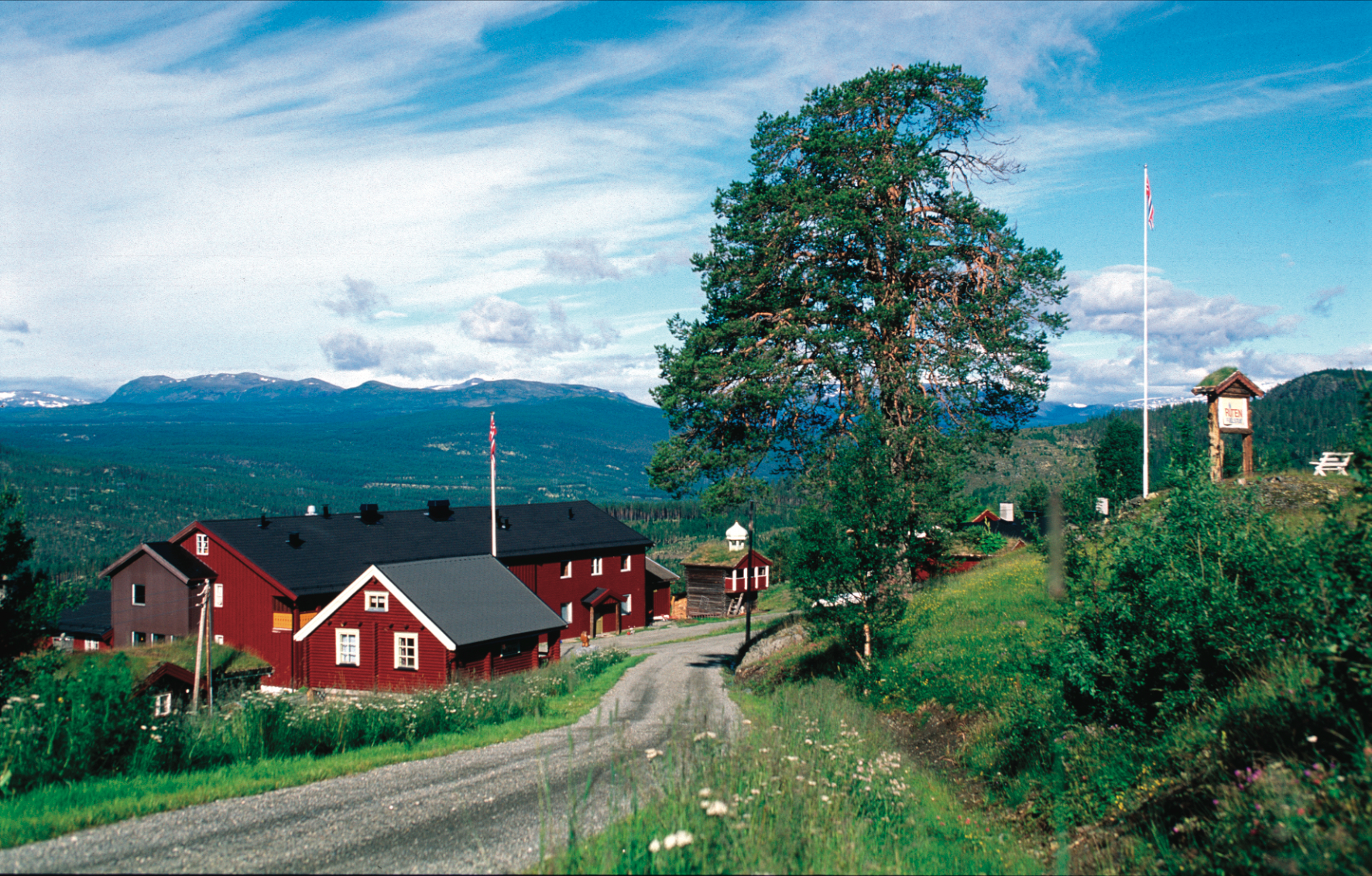
- Ruten Fjellstue in the Espedalen valley
- Length: 18 kilometres (11 mi)

Geology
- Type: River valley

Geography
- Location: Innlandet, Norway
- Coordinates: 61.4263°N 9.4944°E

Location
- Interactive map of the valley

Espedalen is a valley in the Sør-Fron Municipality and Gausdal Municipality in Innlandet county, Norway. The 18-kilometre (11 mi) long valley is a continuation of the Gausdalen valley, which itself is a side valley that branches off of the main Gudbrandsdal valley in Eastern Norway.

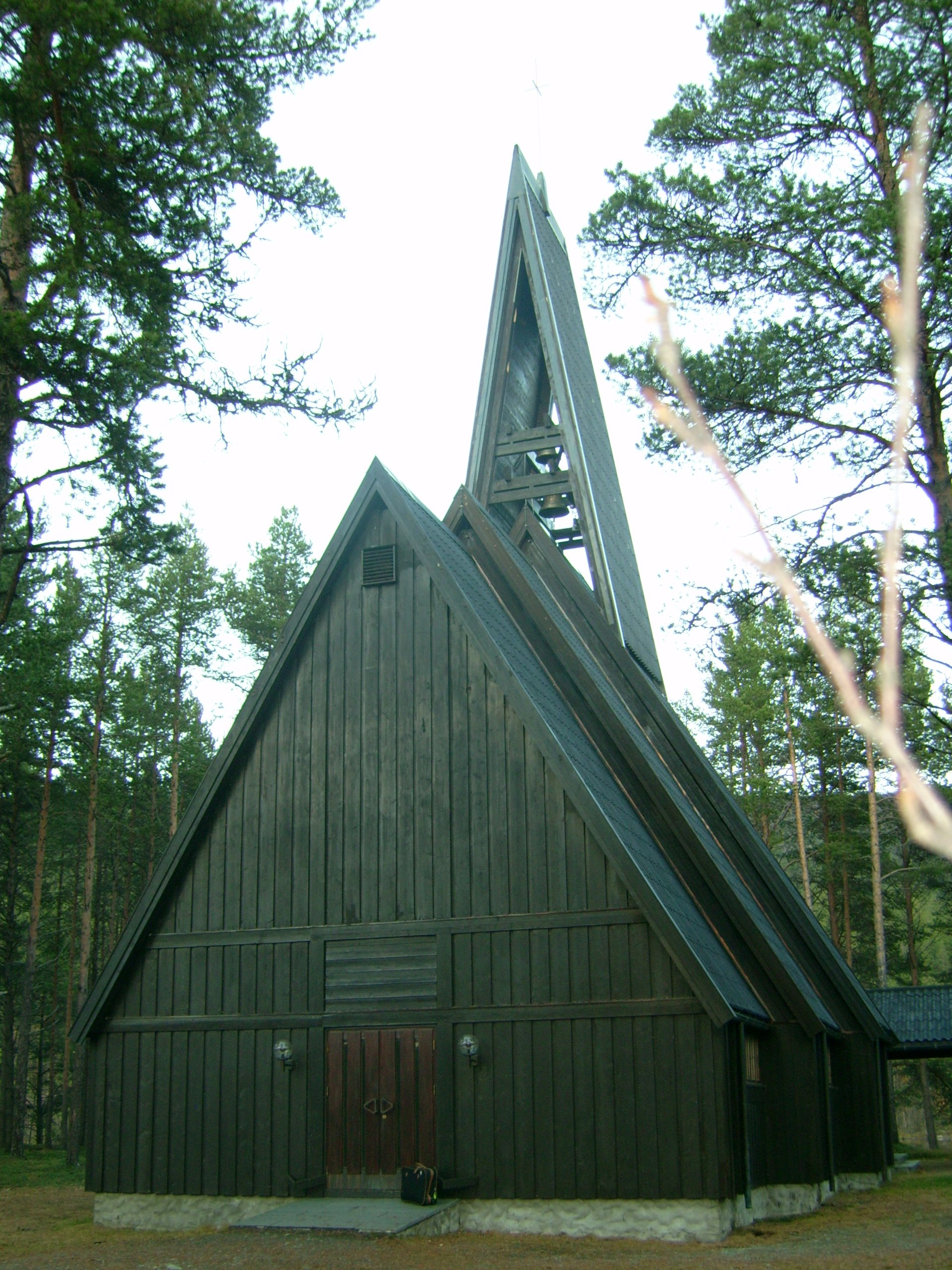
Espedalen Chapel

Espedalen was a mining region for copper dating to the 1600s with nickel mining introduced in the 1880s. At the north end of the lake Espedalsvatnet are the remains of smelting and mining settlements from that time.

Espedalen Chapel was built in 1974 to serve the local population. Peer Gynt Road (Peer Gyntveien) is a 60 kilometres (37 mi) long private tourist road that runs from Svingvoll in Gausdal to Ruten in Espedalen.
