= Gudbrandsdal District Court =

First-instance law court in Norway

- Gudbrandsdal tingrett
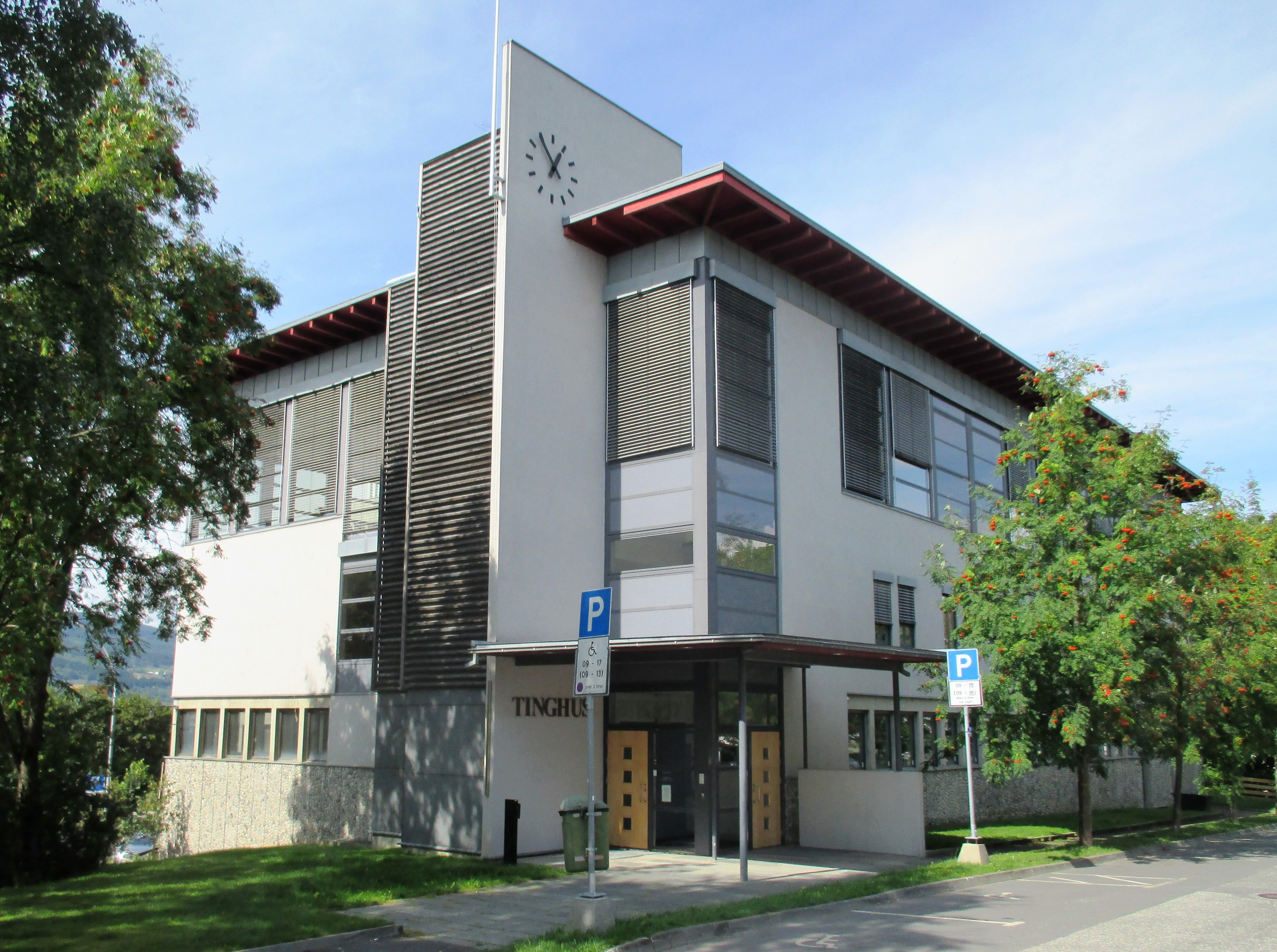
- View of the courthouse in Lillehammer
- 61°07′04″N 10°27′46″E
- Established: 10 June 2025
- Jurisdiction: Gudbrandsdal, Norway
- Location: Lillehammer and Vågåmo
- Coordinates: 61°07′04″N 10°27′46″E
- Appeals to: Eidsivating Court of Appeal
- Website: Official website

Gudbrandsdal District Court (Norwegian: Gudbrandsdal tingrett) is a district court located in Innlandet county, Norway. This court is based at two different courthouses which are located in Lillehammer and Vågåmo. The court is subordinate to the Eidsivating Court of Appeal. The court serves the Gudbrandsdalen region of the county which included cases from 12 municipalities as follows.

- The courthouse in Lillehammer accepts cases from the municipalities of Gausdal, Lillehammer, Ringebu, Sør-Fron, and Øyer.
- The courthouse in Vågåmo accepts cases from the municipalities of Dovre, Lesja, Lom, Nord-Fron, Sel, Skjåk, and Vågå.

The court is led by a chief judge (sorenskriver) and several other judges. The court is a court of first instance. Its judicial duties are mainly to settle criminal cases and to resolve civil litigation as well as bankruptcy. The administration and registration tasks of the court include death registration, issuing certain certificates, performing duties of a notary public, and officiating civil wedding ceremonies. Cases from this court are heard by a combination of professional judges and lay judges. Cases from this district court can be appealed to the Eidsivating Court of Appeal.

== History ==
This court was established on 10 June 2025 after the old Vestre Innlandet District Court was divided into two courts: Gudbrandsdal District Court and Vestoppland og Valdres District Court. The new district courts continued to use the courthouses from the predecessor court.
