= Dale-Gudbrand =

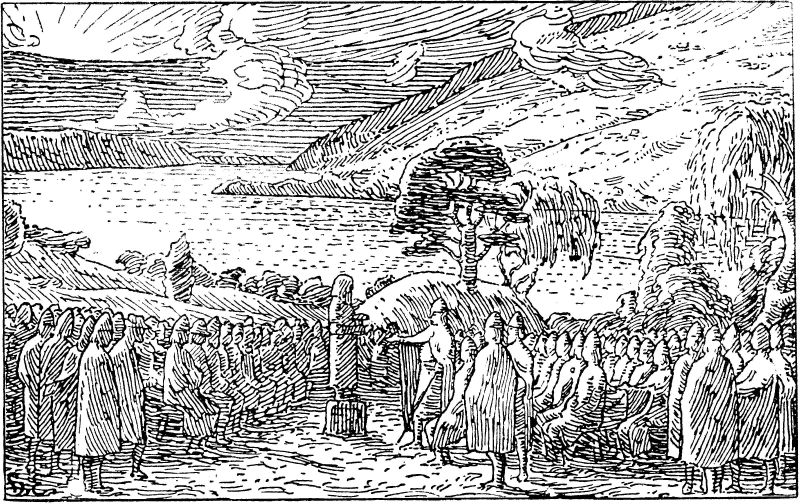
"Olaf II of Norway talks to farmers at the Thing at Hundorp." Illustration by Halfdan Egedius for the Separate Saga of St. Olaf in Heimskringla (J. M. Stenersen's deluxe edition of 1899).

Dale-Gudbrand is a historical Norwegian person that appears in the Separate Saga of St. Olaf in Snorri Sturluson's Heimskringla. He is said to have lived at the farm in Hundorp in the Gudbrand Valley around the year 1000, and to have been the most powerful man in the Gudbrand Valley at that time, with the status of a hersir. He is named in Haakon Jarl's Saga as being allied with Haakon Jarl in his conflict with King Harald Greycloak.

The Separate Saga of St. Olaf describes a meeting between Olaf II of Norway and Dale-Gudbrand in 1021 that was the start of the introduction of Christianity into the Gudbrand Valley.

King Olav agreed to meet the farmers early the next morning, and then the idol of Thor should be borne out. When the meeting was set, Dale-Gudbrand asked the king where his god was. At the same time the sun rose and the king replied, "There comes my God with great light." When the farmers turned to look at the sunrise, Kolbein struck the idol so that it burst and out came mice, lizards, and worms. When they saw this, Dale-Gudbrand and the peasants accepted Christianity.

The story of an idol that is broken is a motif found in many legends and stories about Christianization around Europe. When the hero breaks the idol, the devil comes out in the form of a worm or a dragon. The story is well known in Norway because it was reproduced in Nordahl Rolfsen's Lesebok for Folkeskolen (Elementary School Reader), and then in a retelling by Alexander Bugge.

== See also ==
- Dale-Gudbrand's farm
