= Harpefoss =

Village in Sør-Fron Municipality, Norway

- Village
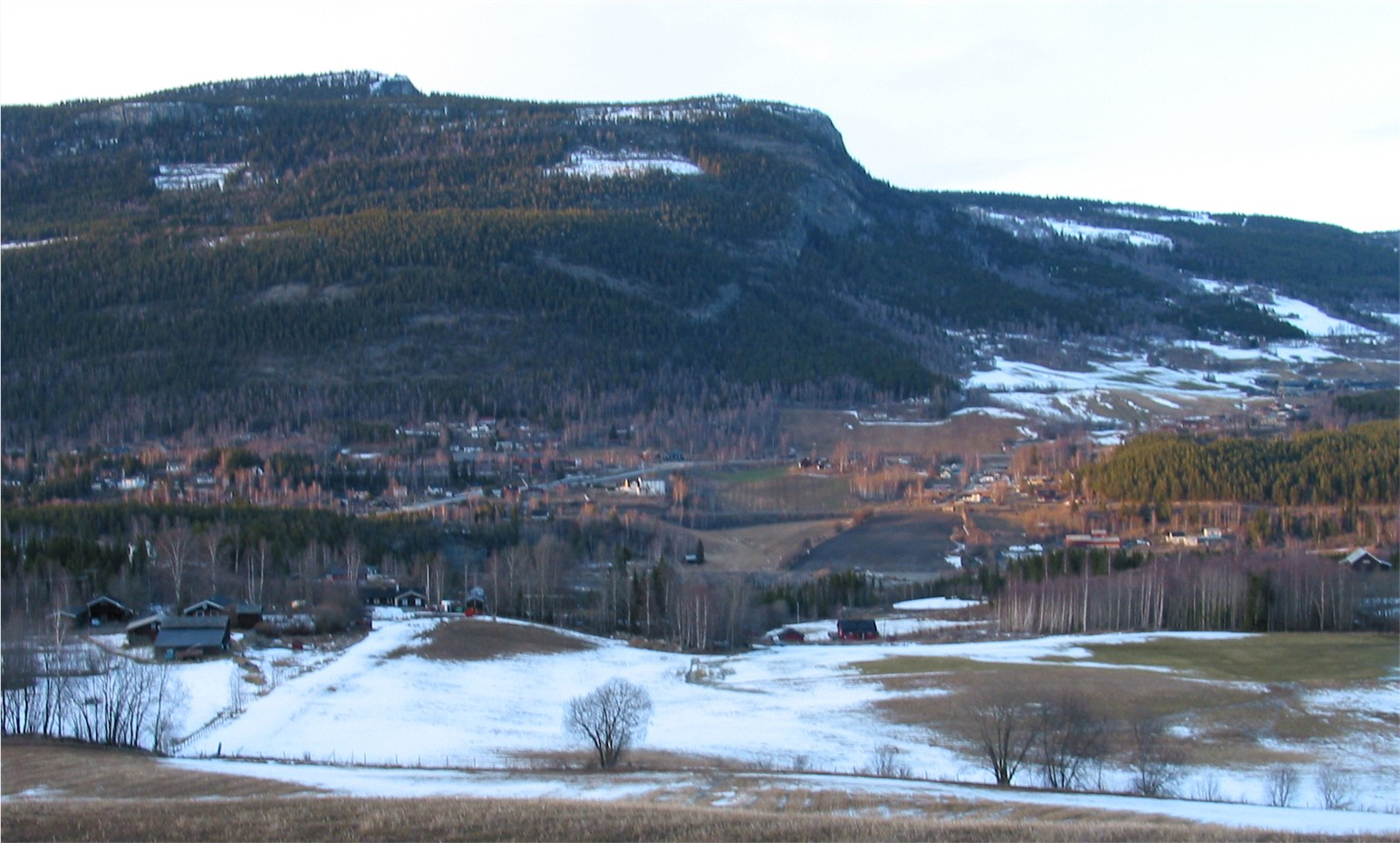
- View of the village
- Interactive map of Harpefoss
- Location within Innlandet Location within Norway
- Coordinates: 61.57798°N 9.86117°E
- Country: Norway
- Region: Eastern Norway
- County: Innlandet
- District: Gudbrandsdalen
- Municipality: Sør-Fron Municipality

Area
  - Total: 0.52 km^{2} (0.20 sq mi)
- Elevation: 252 m (827 ft)

Population (2024)
  - Total: 314
  - Density: 604/km^{2} (1,560/sq mi)
- Time zone: UTC+01:00 (CET)
  - Summer (DST): UTC+02:00 (CEST)
- Post Code: 2647 Sør-Fron

Harpefoss is a village in Sør-Fron Municipality in Innlandet county, Norway. The village is located in the Gudbrandsdal valley on the north shore of the Gudbrandsdalslågen river, about 5 kilometres (3.1 mi) northwest of the village of Hundorp. The 0.52-square-kilometre (130-acre) village has a population (2024) of 314 and a population density of 604 inhabitants per square kilometre (1,560/sq mi). The Dovrebanen railway line runs through the village.

== Education ==
The municipal council in Sør-Fron Municipality began planning for a restructuring of the local schools in 2009. In December 2010, a decision was made which included one new kindergarten in Harpefoss. Both the deputy mayor and the chair of the living conditions committee (Nynorsk: levekårsutvalet), both from the Labour Party, said that the process had not been optimal in that all information that would be necessary for an informed decision had not been gathered.

== History ==
On the night before Christmas 2010, a fire at a cattle barn killed between 20 and 30 cows. Temperatures close to −30 °C (−22 °F) and the closeness of farmhouse made the job of saving the animals difficult for the fire brigade.
