= Hundorp =

Village in Sør-Fron Municipality, Norway

- Village
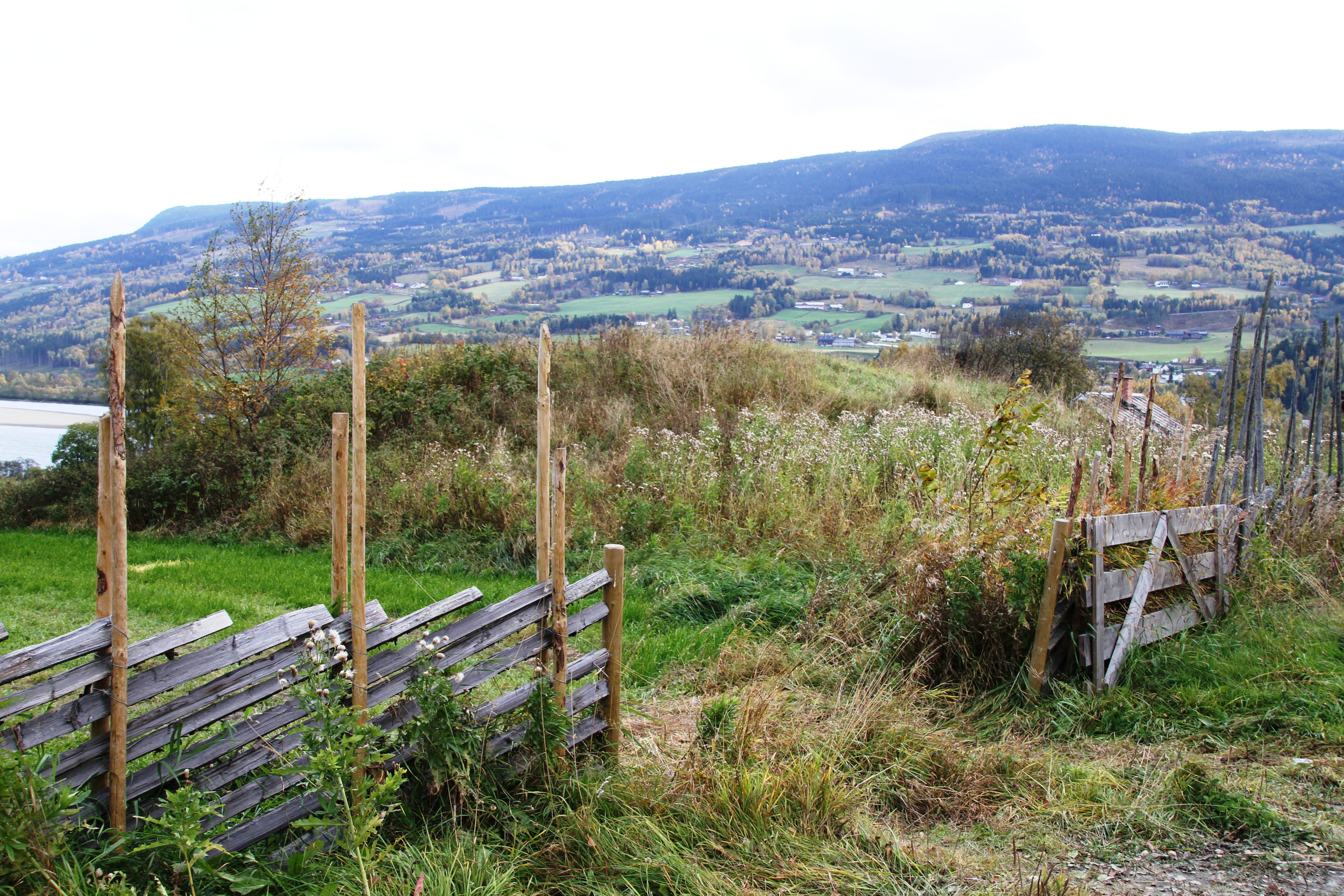
- View of the village in the distance
- Interactive map of Hundorp
- Location within Innlandet Location within Norway
- Coordinates: 61.55527°N 9.94072°E
- Country: Norway
- Region: Eastern Norway
- County: Innlandet
- District: Gudbrandsdalen
- Municipality: Sør-Fron Municipality

Area
  - Total: 0.84 km^{2} (0.32 sq mi)
- Elevation: 262 m (860 ft)

Population (2024)
  - Total: 584
  - Density: 695/km^{2} (1,800/sq mi)
- Time zone: UTC+01:00 (CET)
  - Summer (DST): UTC+02:00 (CEST)
- Post Code: 2647 Sør-Fron

Hundorp is the administrative centre of Sør-Fron Municipality in Innlandet county, Norway. The village is located in the Gudbrandsdal valley along the north shore of the Gudbrandsdalslågen river, about 10 kilometres (6.2 mi) west of the village of Ringebu. The European route E6 highway and the Dovrebanen railway line both pass through the village. The 0.84-square-kilometre (210-acre) village has a population (2024) of 584 and a population density of 695 inhabitants per square kilometre (1,800/sq mi).

Hundorp was also the centre of the petty kingdom of Gudbrandsdalen and was an important place for religion and politics. Dale-Gudbrand's farm, the farm once populated by the ancient ruler Dale-Gudbrand, was chosen as the millennium site of Oppland county.

== Name ==
The village is named after the old Hundorp farm (Old Norse: Hundþorp). The first element is hundr which means 'dog' or 'hound'. The last element is þorp which means 'village'. The name is probably reflecting the fact that at one time this was a village of dog-breeding.
