= Eidsivating Court of Appeal =

Norwegian Court of Appeals

- Eidsivating lagmannsrett
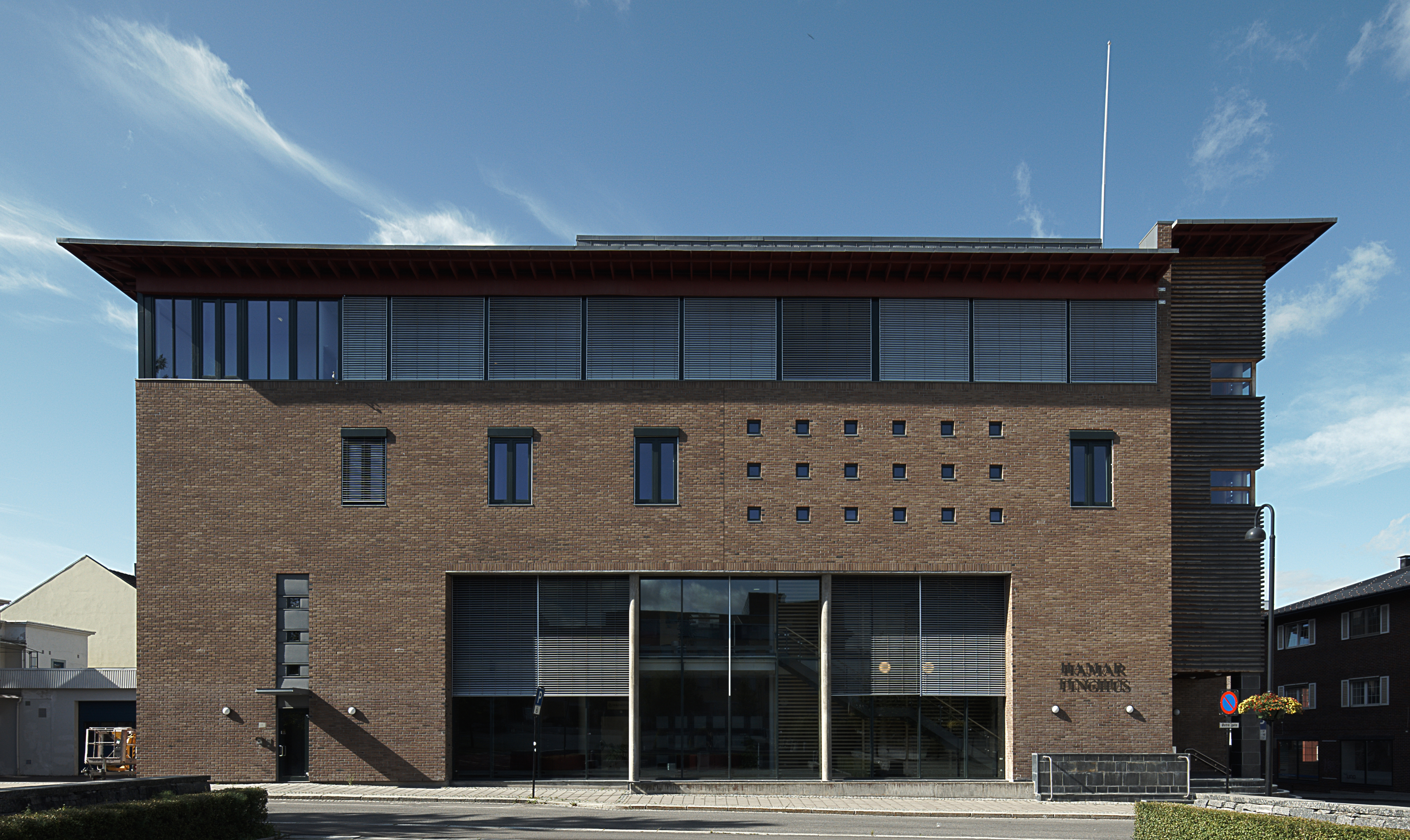
- Eidsivating Court of Appeal sits at the Hamar Courthouse
- 60°47′36″N 11°04′39″E
- Established: 1 July 1936 (1 Jan 1995)
- Jurisdiction: Akershus, Innlandet, and Østfold
- Location: Hamar, Norway
- Coordinates: 60°47′36″N 11°04′39″E
- Composition method: Court of Appeal
- Appeals to: Supreme Court of Norway
- Appeals from: District courts
- Website: Official website

Chief Judge (Førstelagmann)
- Currently: Nina Sollie

The Eidsivating Court of Appeal (Norwegian: Eidsivating lagmannsrett) is one of six courts of appeal in the Kingdom of Norway. The Court is located in the city of Hamar, with jurisdiction over the Eidsivating judicial district (Norwegian: Eidsivating lagdømme), comprising the counties of Innlandet, Østfold, and most of Akershus (except for Lunner Municipality and Jevnaker Municipality). It can rule on both civil and criminal cases that are appealed from one of its subordinate district courts. Court decisions can, with limitations, be appealed to the Supreme Court of Norway. The chief judicial officer of the court (Norwegian: førstelagmann) is Nina Sollie. The court is administered by the Norwegian National Courts Administration.

== Location ==
The Court has its seat in the town of Hamar, and also permanently sits in the towns of Gjøvik, Lillehammer, and Eidsvoll. The Court may also sit in other places within its jurisdiction as needed.

== Jurisdiction ==
This court accepts appeals from all of the district courts from its geographic jurisdiction. This court is divided into judicial regions (Norwegian: lagsogn) and one or more district courts (Norwegian: tingrett) belong to each of these regions.

Judicial Regions (lagsogner)	District courts (tingretter)
Innlandet	Gudbrandsdal District Court; Hedmarken og Østerdal District Court; Vestoppland og Valdres District Court
Romerike og Glåmdal	Romerike og Glåmdal District Court
Follo og Nordre Østfold	Follo og Nordre Østfold District Court

== History ==
In the Middle Ages, the old Eidsivating was a thing for Eastern Norway. The Eidsivating was the court system used for centuries in Norway. In 1797, the court system was changed and the old things were dissolved. In 1890, the court system was changed again to the modern version. A new Eidsivating Court of Appeal was established on 1 January 1890, but it only lasted for two years. In 1892, it was merged into the Eidsiva- og Frostating Court of Appeal. Then on 1 July 1936, a new Eidsivating Court of Appeal was established for most of Eastern Norway. On 1 January 1995, the Eidsivating Court of Appeal was divided. The southwestern part of the old court's jurisdictional area became the new Borgarting Court of Appeal and the northeastern part retained the old Eidsivating Court of Appeal name. On 26 April 2021, the Storting approved moving the areas of eastern Viken county from the Borgarting court to the Eidsivating court.

=== Judges ===
Wilhelm Omsted was the court's presiding judge from 1988 until 1995, then became the presiding judge of the Borgarting Court of Appeal.
