= Millennium site =

Site of cultural and historical significance in Norway

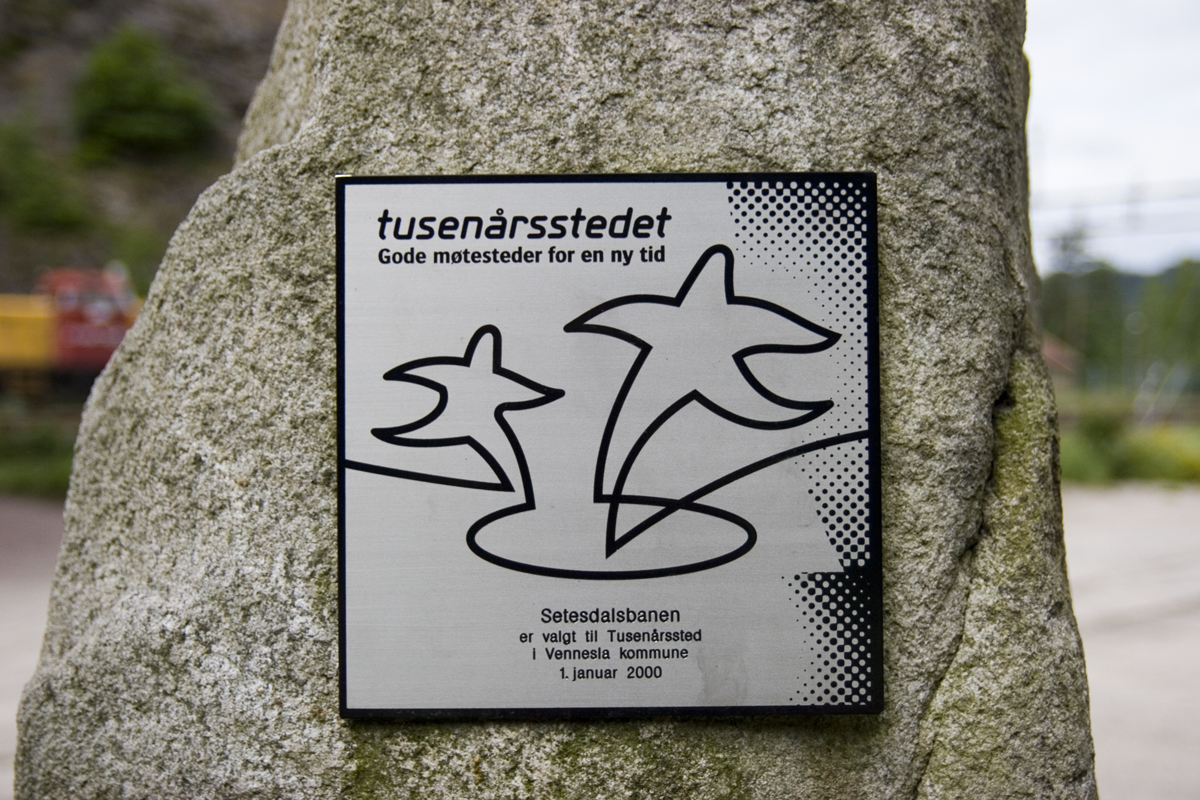
Millennium site marker in Vennesla Municipality

A millennium site (Norwegian: tusenårssted) is a site selected by a Norwegian municipality or county municipality to mark the transition to the 2000s. In Norway it was decided that the counties and municipalities would choose one millennium site for each county and municipality.

== County millennium sites ==
The point of departure for the Ministry of Culture, which was behind the concept of the millennium sites, was that there should be a millennium site in each county, and that these should be designated by 2005. The millennium sites were also seen as connected with the centennial of the 1905 dissolution of the union between Norway and Sweden.

The goal of the county millennium sites is to contribute to taking care of edifices, institutions, cultural environments, natural areas, and so on of great historical, cultural, and environmental value and marking them in a special way. The millennium sites were to have a national cultural and environmental significance that goes beyond the individual county. This goal was to say something about what makes a place a millennium site in the county, and why it was desired to give this place that status. The guidelines for selecting the county millennium sites were determined by the Ministry of Culture, and government support was provided for the millennium sites.

It was a condition for the county millennium sites that they should have some significance for the entire nation. For example, the royal seat of Avaldsnes in Rogaland county at the Nordvegen History Center marks Harald Fairhair's gathering of the smaller chiefdoms and petty kingdoms into one kingdom. The Eidsvoll 1814 Political Center in Eidsvoll Municipality in Akershus county marks democratic governance in the country. Sites such as Avaldsnes, Eidsvoll, and the Petter Dass Museum in Alstahaug Municipality are county millennium sites because they have significance beyond the local community and the county where they are located. People from all parts of the country recall details from historical times that create associations of something in common transcending the individual county when such places are mentioned.

The state emphasized two main measures in its goal for the millennium sites: conservation and marking. Conservation involves setting up buildings and cultural landscapes, making improvements, and making the site easily accessible to the public. The millennium sites should also be physically marked, such as with a plaque, sculpture, or building. Other marking methods could include activities and events.

=== List of county millennium sites ===
| County | Millennium site | Homepage |
|---|---|---|
| Akershus | Eidsvoll 1814, Eidsvoll Manor | Center homepage |
| Aust-Agder | Næs ironworks | Ironworks museum's homepahe |
| Buskerud | Veien Cultural Heritage Park | Veien Cultural Heritage Park website |
| Finnmark | The town of Vardø | |
| Hedmark | Cathedral Ruins in Hamar | Hedmark Museum homepage |
| Hordaland | The Hardanger district | |
| Møre og Romsdal | Art Nouveau Center | Center homepage |
| Nord-Trøndelag | Norveg Coastal Culture and Industry Center | Center homepage |
| Nordland | Petter Dass Museum in Alstahaug | |
| Oppland | Dale-Gudbrand's farm in Hundorp | |
| Oslo | Medieval Oslo | Information page at the Medieval Oslo Association |
| Østfold | Fredriksten Fortress | Millennium site homepage |
| Rogaland | The village of Avaldsnes | |
| Sogn og Fjordane | Gulating | Homepage |
| Sør-Trøndelag | Trøndelag Folk Museum | |
| Telemark | Telemark Canal | Homepage |
| Troms | Hålogaland Theater | Homepage |
| Vest-Agder | Lindesnes Lighthouse | Homepage |
| Vestfold | Midgard Historical Center and Borre Park | Homepage |

== Municipal millennium sites ==
At the municipal level, the millennium sites were to be a physical manifestation the turn of the millennium and were to be chosen through a local selection process. The place could be a busy square used for trade, a promenade along a river, a well-known bridge or ferry quay, a monumental space, or a quiet place off the beaten track.

In an information circular from the Ministry of Culture from May 1999, Minister Anne Enger wrote that "the millennium sites will be a meeting place for various user groups linked to a new or existing building, facility, square, cultural environment, nature area, and so on. The funds should preferably be used to establish a new 'location', possibly upgrading an existing one beyond its usual maintenance. For those municipalities that for various reasons do not find it appropriate to establish a special millennium site, the subsidy may be used to improve public spaces in the municipality."

Financial support amounting to NOK 119,500 was given to the municipalities by the organizing company Tusenårsskiftet-Norge 2000 AS. The organizing company was a fully state-owned company whose purpose was to prepare and carry out marking the new millennium and the centenary of the dissolution of the union between Norway and Sweden in 1905.

=== List of municipal millennium sites ===
| Municipality | County | Millennium site | Website |
|---|---|---|---|
| Åfjord | Sør-Trøndelag | Dragseid prehistoric burial site | Website |
| Agdenes | Sør-Trøndelag | Fjølåsen settlement | Municipal website |
| Ål | Buskerud | Hallingtunet stage in Ål Public Park | |
| Ålesund | Møre og Romsdal | Molja Lighthouse and Molovegen (Mole Street) | |
| Alstahaug | Nordland | Old Sandnes | |
| Alta | Finnmark | No site | |
| Alvdal | Hedmark | Aukrust Center | Center homepage |
| Åmli | Aust-Agder | Elvarheim Museum | Municipal website |
| Åmot | Hedmark | Nesvangen, a plain | |
| Andebu | Vestfold | Downtown park | |
| Andøy | Nordland | The harbor | |
| Årdal | Sogn og Fjordane | Squares in Årdalstangen and Øvre Årdal | |
| Aremark | Østfold | The Furulund area | |
| Arendal | Aust-Agder | Arendal Square | |
| Ås | Akershus | Town hall neighborhood | |
| Åseral | Vest-Agder | No site | |
| Asker | Akershus | Semsvannet and vicinity | |
| Askim | Østfold | Østfold Pool at the Cultural Center | Pool website |
| Askøy | Hordaland | Cultural center in Hetlevik | Center website |
| Askvoll | Sogn og Fjordane | Askvoll parsonage garden | |
| Åsnes | Hedmark | Utsikten Park | |
| Audnedal | Vest-Agder | No site | |
| Aukra | Møre og Romsdal | Square in downtown Falkhytten near the municipal office | |
| Aure | Møre og Romsdal | Aure Church and town | Municipal website |
| Aurland | Sogn og Fjordane | Site where the old stave church stood | |
| Aurskog-Høland | Akershus | Millennium Site Park | |
| Austevoll | Hordaland | Storebø | |
| Austrheim | Hordaland | Ambient street and central area in Årås/Sætre | |
| Averøy | Møre og Romsdal | Kvernes cultural area | |
| Bærum | Akershus | Høvikodden, a headland | |
| Balestrand | Sogn og Fjordane | Balehaugen, a Viking burial site | |
| Ballangen | Nordland | Husvannet, a lake | |
| Balsfjord | Troms | Fjord Museum in Storsteinnes | |
| Bamble | Telemark | Krogshavn, a park | |
| Bardu | Troms | Bardu Church, church park and river park | |
| Båtsfjord | Finnmark | Båtsfjord Recreation Center | |
| Beiarn | Nordland | Beiarn Open-Air Museum | |
| Berg | Troms | Geitskar Tunnel | |
| Bergen | Hordaland | Fana Church and surrounding landscape | |
| Bindal | Nordland | Kjeldeide, an isthmus | |
| Birkenes | Aust-Agder | Tobias Jorde, a performance venue | |
| Bjarkøy | Troms | Folkvang, Fredvang, and Trudvang (youth clubs) | |
| Bjerkreim | Rogaland | Central square in Bjerkreim | |
| Bjugn | Sør-Trøndelag | Mølnargården, an open-air museum | Homepage |
| Berlevåg | Finnmark | Park by the Second World War monument | |
| Bø | Nordland | Area near the primary schools | |
| Bø | Telemark | Kvennøya, an open-air museum | |
| Bodø | Nordland | Nyholmen Sconce | |
| Bokn | Rogaland | Site with a stream driving a horizontal mill | |
| Bømlo | Hordaland | Moster Amfi (an amphitheater) and church history center | Moster Amfi homepage |
| Bremanger | Sogn og Fjordane | The Gloføyke Farm, a Stone Age site | |
| Brønnøy | Nordland | Brønnøy Church and Brønnøysund's old church site | |
| Bygland | Aust-Agder | Byglandsfjord Station | |
| Bykle | Aust-Agder | Hegni, a former settlement and recreation area | |
| Dønna | Nordland | Old Nordvik Trading Post | |
| Dovre | Oppland | Dombås Cinema and Cultural Center | |
| Drammen | Buskerud | Bragernes Square | |
| Drangedal | Telemark | A beach on Lake Toke | |
| Dyrøy | Troms | The Elvetun Farm | |
| Eid | Sogn og Fjordane | Malakoff, a former military drilling ground in Nordfjordeid | Homepage |
| Eide | Møre og Romsdal | Solvang youth center in Lyngstad with outdoor facilities | |
| Eidfjord | Hordaland | Park near the municipal office | |
| Eidsberg | Østfold | The northern part of David Blid Street (David Blidsgate) | |
| Eidskog | Hedmark | Peace monument at Morokulien | |
| Eidsvoll | Akershus | Eidsvoll Manor | |
| Eigersund | Rogaland | Culture School | Homepage |
| Elverum | Hedmark | Rådhusplassen (Town Hall Square) | |
| Enebakk | Akershus | Enebakk Church | |
| Engerdal | Hedmark | Outdoor area at Engerdal Hall | Municipal website |
| Etne | Hordaland | Farm and church at Stødle | |
| Etnedal | Oppland | Bruflat | |
| Evenes | Nordland | Evenes Church | |
| Evje og Hornnes | Aust-Agder | A place at Hornnes Auxiliary Prison and one at Verksmoen | |
| Farsund | Vest-Agder | Farsund Square with a pavilion | |
| Fauske | Nordland | Fauske Museum | Museum website |
| Fedje | Hordaland | Waiting room at the ferry station | |
| Fet | Akershus | Flood mark at Fetsund Booms | |
| Finnøy | Rogaland | Teigen Amphitheater | |
| Fitjar | Hordaland | Håkon Park in central Fitjar | |
| Fjaler | Sogn og Fjordane | Millennium Park, sexton's farm | |
| Fjell | Hordaland | Langøy Coastal Cultural Center | Center homepage |
| Flakstad | Nordland | Flakstad Church | |
| Flatanger | Nord-Trøndelag | Meeting place at Stranda | |
| Flekkefjord | Vest-Agder | Cultural center in the cinema block | |
| Flesberg | Buskerud | Stevningsmogen Recreation Park | Municipal website |
| Flora | Sogn og Fjordane | Square | |
| Flå | Buskerud | Home of the actor Kolbjørn Buøen at Grønvold | |
| Folldal | Hedmark | Folldal Mines | Mine website |
| Førde | Sogn og Fjordane | Area in the town park | |
| Forsand | Rogaland | Square in front of the Forsand Cultural Center | |
| Fosnes | Nord-Trøndelag | Three separate sites | |
| Fræna | Møre og Romsdal | Multipurpose center in Elnesvågen | |
| Fredrikstad | Østfold | Site in the park near the town hall | |
| Frei | Møre og Romsdal | Rastarkalv, a medieval battle site | |
| Frogn | Akershus | Swimming park | |
| Froland | Aust-Agder | Frolands Verk Cultural Center | Center homepage |
| Frosta | Nord-Trøndelag | No site | |
| Frøya | Sør-Trøndelag | Kya, a former fishing village | |
| Fusa | Hordaland | Central Leiro area in Eikelandsosen | |
| Fyresdal | Telemark | Fyresdal Open Air Museum | Museum website |
| Gamvik | Finnmark | No site | |
| Gaular | Sogn og Fjordane | The Osen Farm | |
| Gausdal | Oppland | Gausdal Cultural Center | |
| Gildeskål | Nordland | Gildeskål Church | |
| Giske | Møre og Romsdal | Giske Church and surrounding area | |
| Gjemnes | Møre og Romsdal | Rådhusplassen (Town Hall Square) | |
| Gjerdrum | Akershus | Square outside the cultural center | |
| Gjerstad | Aust-Agder | Surrounding area | |
| Gjesdal | Rogaland | Veveritorget (Weaver Square) | |
| Gjøvik | Oppland | The Gjøvik Farm | Museum website |
| Gloppen | Sogn og Fjordane | Heradsplassen (Village Square) | |
| Gol | Buskerud | Gol Community Center, with outdoor area by school and Sentrumsparken (Central Park) | |
| Gran | Oppland | The village of Granavollen | |
| Grane | Nordland | Grane Open Air Museum | Museum website |
| Granvin | Hordaland | Trudvang Youth Center | |
| Gratangen | Troms | Addition to parish hall at Gratangen Church | |
| Grimstad | Aust-Agder | Fjære Church | |
| Grong | Nord-Trøndelag | Fiskum Falls, Formo Falls, and Tømmerås Falls | |
| Grue | Hedmark | Downtown Kirkenær | |
| Gulen | Sogn og Fjordane | Gulating (shared with the county) | Homepage |
| Hå | Rogaland | Square at the harbor in Obrestad | |
| Hadsel | Nordland | Richard Withs plass (Richard With Square) and Coastal Express Building | |
| Hægebostad | Vest-Agder | Snartemo Stone Monument Park | |
| Halden | Østfold | Fredriksten fortress | |
| Halsa | Møre og Romsdal | Halsa Center | Municipal website |
| Hamar | Hedmark | Cathedral Ruins in Hamar | Museum homepage |
| Hamarøy | Nordland | The Skogheim Farm | |
| Hammerfest | Finnmark | Museum of Reconstruction for Finnmark and North Troms | Museum homepage |
| Haram | Møre og Romsdal | Old site of Haram Church | |
| Hareid | Møre og Romsdal | Central square | |
| Harstad | Troms | The parish of Trondenes | |
| Hasvik | Finnmark | Sandvika recreation area | Municipal website |
| Hattfjelldal | Nordland | Fjellfolkets hus, a multipurpose community center | Homepage |
| Haugesund | Rogaland | Harald's Mound | |
| Hemne | Sør-Trøndelag | Nerøra, square in front of the town hall | |
| Hemnes | Nordland | Lapphella neighborhood in Hemnesberget | |
| Hemsedal | Buskerud | Klokkarsteinen, a rock formation | |
| Herøy | Møre og Romsdal | The Herøy Farm | |
| Herøy | Nordland | Herøy Church and Open Air Museum | |
| Hitra | Sør-Trøndelag | Sør-Trøndelag Coastal Museum | Museum website |
| Hjartdal | Telemark | Heddal Mill | |
| Hjelmeland | Rogaland | Outdoor stage in Hjelmelandsvågen | |
| Hobøl | Østfold | Vestre Bråte Open Air Museum | Municipal website |
| Hof | Vestfold | Solvang, a park | |
| Hol | Buskerud | Hallingskarvet Mountains | |
| Hole | Buskerud | Vik Square | |
| Holmestrand | Vestfold | Dr. Graaruds plass (Dr. Graarud Square) with extension of Nysgjerrig Square | Homepage |
| Holtålen | Sør-Trøndelag | Old farm with Haltdalen Stave Church | |
| Hornindal | Sogn og Fjordane | Laurapromenaden (Laura Promenade) | |
| Horten | Vestfold | Cultural center at Storgata 37 | Website |
| Høyanger | Sogn og Fjordane | Town square in Høyanger | Municipal website |
| Høylandet | Nord-Trøndelag | Humoristen, a stone monument | |
| Hurdal | Akershus | Dahle Center | |
| Hurum | Buskerud | Hovtun municipal building, Hurum Church, and surrounding area | |
| Hvaler | Østfold | Hvaler Church and surrounding area | |
| Hyllestad | Sogn og Fjordane | Millstone Park | Homepage |
| Ibestad | Troms | Ibestad Church | |
| Inderøy | Nord-Trøndelag | Muustrø Park | Website |
| Iveland | Aust-Agder | The area around Birketveittjønna, a lake | |
| Jevnaker | Oppland | Hadeland Glass Works | Glass works homepage |
| Jølster | Sogn og Fjordane | The village of Ålhus | |
| Jondal | Hordaland | Hereiane, a natural mountain area | |
| Kåfjord | Troms | Pavilion in Kongeparken (King Park) in Olderdalen | |
| Karasjok | Finnmark | Oalgevárri (a hill) and the Old Karasjok Church | |
| Karlsøy | Troms | Square and park at the ferry port in Hansnes | |
| Karmøy | Rogaland | Nordvegen History Center at Avaldsnes | Website |
| Kautokeino | Finnmark | Durkkihanvárri (a hill) | |
| Klæbu | Sør-Trøndelag | Old festival hall at Seminarplassen | |
| Klepp | Rogaland | Kleppevarden (a hill) | |
| Kongsberg | Buskerud | Church Square | |
| Kongsvinger | Hedmark | Kongsvinger Fortress | |
| Kragerø | Telemark | Beach promenade along Blindtarmen Marina | |
| Kristiansand | Vest-Agder | Tresse Park along the Kristiansand Boardwalk | |
| Kristiansund | Møre og Romsdal | Reconstructed town | Website |
| Krødsherad | Buskerud | Bjørøya, an islet | |
| Kvæfjord | Troms | Hemmestad wharf and Trastad Collections | Museum wharf, Museum collection |
| Kvænangen | Troms | Vapsgieddi/Noaidegieddi cultural landscape | |
| Kvalsund | Finnmark | No site | |
| Kvam | Hordaland | Hardanger Maritime Museum | Museum website |
| Kvinesdal | Vest-Agder | Fjotland Open Air Museum | Museum website |
| Kvinnherad | Hordaland | The villages of Husnes and Rosendal | |
| Kviteseid | Telemark | The village of Kviteseid | |
| Kvitsøy | Rogaland | The Kvitsøy bascule light | |
| Lærdal | Sogn og Fjordane | Old Lærdalsøyri, a heritage village | Website |
| Lardal | Vestfold | Kjærra Bridge | Kjærra Park website |
| Larvik | Vestfold | inner harbor | |
| Lavangen | Troms | Soløy archaeological site | |
| Lebesby | Finnmark | The village of Kunes | |
| Leikanger | Sogn og Fjordane | No site | |
| Leirfjord | Nordland | Cultural center in Leland | |
| Leka | Nord-Trøndelag | Herlaughallen cultural center and sports hall | |
| Leksvik | Nord-Trøndelag | Square next to the Leksvik municipal office | |
| Lenvik | Troms | Lake Finnsnes and Arvid Hanssens plass (Arvid Hanssen Square) | |
| Lesja | Oppland | Lesja Open Air Museum | Museum website |
| Levanger | Nord-Trøndelag | The village of Stiklestad | |
| Lier | Buskerud | Lier Open Air Museum | |
| Lierne | Nord-Trøndelag | Sørli museum | Museum website |
| Lillehammer | Oppland | Stortorget (Big Square) | |
| Lillesand | Aust-Agder | Havnetomta park and recreation center | |
| Lindås | Hordaland | Haakon the Good's burial mound (Håkonshaugen) at Seim | Website |
| Lindesnes | Vest-Agder | Kråkevika beach and theater | |
| Lødingen | Nordland | Hjertholmen, an islet | |
| Lom | Oppland | Old Lom parsonage (now Lom library) and Lom Stave Church | |
| Loppa | Finnmark | Multipurpose center in Øksfjord | |
| Lørenskog | Akershus | Square in the new Lørenskog downtown | |
| Løten | Hedmark | Løten Arena | |
| Lund | Rogaland | Moi Station | |
| Lunner | Oppland | Frøystad School | |
| Lurøy | Nordland | Lurøy Church | |
| Luster | Sogn og Fjordane | Park in Gaupne | |
| Lyngdal | Vest-Agder | Lyngdal cultural center | |
| Lyngen | Troms | No site | |
| Målselv | Troms | Mål River watercourse | |
| Malvik | Sør-Trøndelag | Church lodge at Malvik Church | |
| Mandal | Vest-Agder | Vigeland House | Museum website |
| Marker | Østfold | Tangen recreational area | |
| Marnardal | Vest-Agder | Høgtun cultural center | |
| Masfjorden | Hordaland | The fjord | |
| Måsøy | Finnmark | Havøysund Square | |
| Meland | Hordaland | Frekhaug Torg (Frekhaug Square) | |
| Meldal | Sør-Trøndelag | No site | |
| Melhus | Sør-Trøndelag | Gimse, Rimol, and Sagastien history park | |
| Meløy | Nordland | The Meløy Farm, Meløy Church and memorial stones next to the church | Municipal website |
| Meråker | Nord-Trøndelag | Internet café | |
| Midsund | Møre og Romsdal | Area around Krabbevikbua, the marina in the downtown area | |
| Midtre Gauldal | Sør-Trøndelag | Buosen, a recreation area | |
| Modalen | Hordaland | Mo Church | |
| Modum | Buskerud | Stasjonsevja, a park area in Geithus | |
| Molde | Møre og Romsdal | Rådhustaket: the area west of the cathedral, town hall square, and square with canal front | |
| Moskenes | Nordland | Amphitheater | Website |
| Moss | Østfold | Mosse Falls and Convention Farm | |
| Mosvik | Nord-Trøndelag | Petroglyphs at Kvennavika | Directorate for Cultural Heritage website |
| Nærøy | Nord-Trøndelag | Nærøya, an island | |
| Namdalseid | Nord-Trøndelag | Sjøåsen recreation area | |
| Namsos | Nord-Trøndelag | Spillum Steam Sawmill & Planing Mill | Museum website |
| Namsskogan | Nord-Trøndelag | No site | |
| Nannestad | Akershus | No site | |
| Narvik | Nordland | Geology Museum | |
| Naustdal | Sogn og Fjordane | Outdoor swimming area at Sanden | |
| Nedre Eiker | Buskerud | Former soccer field in Krokstadelva | |
| Nes | Akershus | Nes Church ruins | |
| Nes | Buskerud | Eidal General Store in the Rukke Valley | Eidal General Store at DigitaltMuseum |
| Nesna | Nordland | Zahl Bridge | |
| Nesodden | Akershus | Vanntårnet Gallery and the surrounding area | Gallery website |
| Nesseby | Finnmark | Varanger Sami Museum | Museum website |
| Nesset | Møre og Romsdal | Nesset Parsonage | |
| Nissedal | Telemark | Old engine shed with surrounding area, known as "Sommarsletta" | |
| Nittedal | Akershus | Site on the north side of the town hall | |
| Nome | Telemark | Nome beach | |
| Nord-Aurdal | Oppland | Skiferplassen (Slate Square) in Fagernes | |
| Norddal | Møre og Romsdal | Sylte, the municipal center in Valldal | |
| Nord-Fron | Oppland | Vinstra coaching inn | |
| Nordkapp | Finnmark | Steps | |
| Nord-Odal | Hedmark | Sandfossen, an old industrial area | |
| Nordreisa | Troms | Halti Kven Cultural and National Park Center | |
| Nordre Land | Oppland | Theater building at Lands Museum | Museum homepage |
| Nore og Uvdal | Buskerud | Square between the Nore Power Plant and Rødberg Train Station | |
| Nøtterøy | Vestfold | Fagertun lensmann's farm | Website |
| Notodden | Telemark | Bok- og Blueshuset cultural center | Center website |
| Odda | Hordaland | Tyssedal Hydroelectric Power Station | |
| Øksnes | Nordland | Harbor in Myre | |
| Ølen | Hordaland and Rogaland | Joa-Kari park in downtown Ølen | |
| Oppdal | Sør-Trøndelag | Outdoor area at the cultural center | |
| Oppegård | Akershus | The Østre Greverud Farm | Municipal website |
| Orkdal | Sør-Trøndelag | Station area at Fannrem | Website |
| Ørland | Sør-Trøndelag | The Austrått Farm | |
| Ørskog | Møre og Romsdal | Lerkelunden, a moor | |
| Ørsta | Møre og Romsdal | The Svendsen Farm (Svendsengarden), a property in downtown Ørsta | |
| Os | Hedmark | Os community center | |
| Os | Hordaland | Kyrkjeflaten, a park | |
| Osen | Sør-Trøndelag | Pavilion in the downtown area | |
| Oslo | Oslo | Medieval Oslo | |
| Osterøy | Hordaland | Hamre Church and the area around the town hall and sports hall | |
| Østre Toten | Oppland | Hoff Field (Hoffsvangen) | |
| Overhalla | Nord-Trøndelag | Ranem Church | |
| Øvre Eiker | Buskerud | Old district judge's residence and park in Hokksund | |
| Øyer | Oppland | Stav, a marketplace | |
| Øygarden | Hordaland | Øygarden Coastal Museum area | Museum website |
| Øystre Slidre | Oppland | Public library | |
| Porsanger | Finnmark | Børselv and Kven culture and language center | |
| Porsgrunn | Telemark | Area between the town hall and the river with Rådhusplass (Town Hall Square) and parts of the Østre Brygge area | |
| Råde | Østfold | Karlshusbakken recreation area | |
| Radøy | Hordaland | Radøy cultural landscape | |
| Rælingen | Akershus | Bjønnåsen, a hill | |
| Rakkestad | Østfold | Rakkestad Open Air Museum | Municipal website |
| Ramnes | Vestfold | Millpond and surrounding area | |
| Rana | Nordland | Old square in front of Moholmen | |
| Randaberg | Rogaland | Center | |
| Rauma | Møre og Romsdal | Square at the train station | |
| Rendalen | Hedmark | The Pilgrim Stone (or Åkre Stone) at Fagertun School in Åkre | |
| Rennebu | Sør-Trøndelag | Outdoor stage between Berkåk School and Rennebu Hall | |
| Rennesøy | Rogaland | Site associated with a gravestone near downtown Vikevåg | |
| Re | Vestfold | Millpond and surrounding area and Våle Parsonage | |
| Rindal | Møre og Romsdal | Rindal Open Air Museum and new ski museum | Museum website |
| Ringebu | Oppland | Ringebu Stave Church with surrounding area, Ringebu Parsonage, and Gildesvolden (a former rampart) | |
| Ringerike | Buskerud | Hringariki Heritage Park | |
| Ringsaker | Hedmark | The Mo Farm | Municipal website |
| Rissa | Sør-Trøndelag | Amphitheater between the Stadsbygd Parsonage garden and Coastal Heritage Museum in Stadsbygd | |
| Risør | Aust-Agder | Square | |
| Roan | Sør-Trøndelag | Roan Church, a.k.a. Fosen cathedral | |
| Rødøy | Nordland | Selsøyvik Trading Post | |
| Rollag | Buskerud | Area around Rollag Stave Church | |
| Rømskog | Østfold | The Kurøen Farm | |
| Røros | Sør-Trøndelag | Malmplassen (Malm Square) | |
| Røst | Nordland | Brygga Trading Post | |
| Røyken | Buskerud | Old road | |
| Røyrvik | Nord-Trøndelag | Two assembly buildings: Gudøyvangen and the municipal building in Røyrvik | |
| Rygge | Østfold | Rygge Open Air Museum | |
| Salangen | Troms | Lundbrygga Museum | Museum website |
| Saltdal | Nordland | Rognan wharves | |
| Samnanger | Hordaland | Ytre Tysse activity trail | |
| Sandefjord | Vestfold | Jernbanealleen (Railroad Street) | |
| Sande | Møre og Romsdal | Kongsvollen, an open-air recreation area on Sandsøya | |
| Sande | Vestfold | Sande Square | |
| Sandnes | Rogaland | Millennium logo at the train station and Millennium Park | |
| Sandøy | Møre og Romsdal | Center development project, not carried out | |
| Sarpsborg | Østfold | Sarpsborg torg (Sarpsborg Square) | |
| Sauda | Rogaland | Rådhusplassen (Town Hall Square) | |
| Sauherad | Telemark | Patmos Sculpture Park | Website |
| Selbu | Sør-Trøndelag | Music pavilion and square in downtown Selbu | |
| Selje | Sogn og Fjordane | Selje Abbey | Website |
| Seljord | Telemark | Seljord Church | |
| Sel | Oppland | Station Park | |
| Sigdal | Buskerud | Sigdal Museum | Museum homepage |
| Siljan | Telemark | Former coal depot (now a performance venue) at Moholt Ironworks | |
| Sirdal | Vest-Agder | Dorga Falls | |
| Skånland | Troms | Skånland Multipurpose Center | |
| Skaun | Sør-Trøndelag | Church ruins at Husaby | Directorate for Cultural Heritage website |
| Skedsmo | Akershus | Sag Park | |
| Ski | Akershus | Park area next to the town hall | |
| Skien | Telemark | The Morild project: lighting and fountains along the Skien River | |
| Skiptvet | Østfold | Local history archive | |
| Skjåk | Oppland | Old drying house at Skamsar Bridge | |
| Skjerstad | Nordland | Graddholm, an islet | |
| Skjervøy | Troms | Site connected with the dog musher Leonhard Seppala | |
| Skodje | Møre og Romsdal | Millennium Park around Jentekolonien, a girls' camp | Website |
| Smøla | Møre og Romsdal | Center and area on Edøya | |
| Snåsa | Nord-Trøndelag | Snåsa Church and surrounding area | |
| Snillfjord | Sør-Trøndelag | Square between the town hall and Coop store in Krokstadøra | |
| Sogndal | Sogn og Fjordane | Square in front of the Sogndal Cultural Center | |
| Søgne | Vest-Agder | Old Søgne Parsonage Cultural Center | |
| Sokndal | Rogaland | Old Hauge School Cultural Center | |
| Sola | Rogaland | Tananger Church and park at the cultural center | |
| Solund | Sogn og Fjordane | Coastal arboretum at Hardbakke | |
| Sømna | Nordland | Kirkehaugen, a hill in Vik | |
| Søndre Land | Oppland | Fall River | |
| Sogndalen | Vest-Agder | Paal-Helge Haugen Park | |
| Sør-Aurdal | Oppland | Bagnsmoen trading post with Vangen (a mountain farm) and Ulekyrkjetomta (a former stave church site) | Website |
| Sør-Fron | Oppland | Dale-Gudbrand's farm in Hundorp | |
| Sør-Odal | Hedmark | Lyshuset Gallery | |
| Sør-Varanger | Finnmark | Malmklang Cultural Center | |
| Sørfold | Nordland | No site | |
| Sørreisa | Troms | Kramvig Wharf, a former commercial building | |
| Sortland | Nordland | Minnelunden (the old cemetery site) | |
| Sørum | Akershus | Urskog–Høland Line | |
| Spydeberg | Østfold | Nesparken (Headland Park) | |
| Stange | Hedmark | Stange Church | |
| Stavanger | Rogaland | Square, Blue Promenade, and city park | |
| Steigen | Nordland | Allhus (a sports hall) | |
| Steinkjer | Nord-Trøndelag | Steinkjer Torg (Steinkjer Square) | |
| Stjørdal | Nord-Trøndelag | Square | |
| Stokke | Vestfold | Bokemoa, a moor | |
| Stordal | Møre og Romsdal | Ytste Skotet, a historical farm | Museum website |
| Stord | Hordaland | Leirvik Torg (Leirvik Square) | |
| Stor-Elvdal | Hedmark | Center, marked with sculpture | |
| Storfjord | Troms | Old marketplace in Skibotn | |
| Stranda | Møre og Romsdal | Four sites selected by the district councils | |
| Strand | Rogaland | Park in Grahamshagen | |
| Stryn | Sogn og Fjordane | Per Bolstad plass (Per Bolstad Square) | |
| Sula | Møre og Romsdal | Downtown park | |
| Suldal | Rogaland | Square and amphitheater behind the cultural center | |
| Sund | Hordaland | Glesvær Trading Post | |
| Sunndal | Møre og Romsdal | Øratorget (Øra Square) | |
| Surnadal | Møre og Romsdal | Surnadal Cultural Center | Homepage |
| Sveio | Hordaland | Ryvarden Lighthouse | |
| Svelvik | Vestfold | Northern part of Batteriøya, an island | |
| Sykkylven | Møre og Romsdal | Auremarka, a museum site | |
| Tana | Finnmark | No site | |
| Time | Rogaland | Bryne Mill | |
| Tingvoll | Møre og Romsdal | Tingvoll Church and surrounding area | |
| Tinn | Telemark | Vemork hydroelectric plant | |
| Tjeldsund | Nordland | Tjeldsund Museum | |
| Tjøme | Vestfold | Square at Verdens Ende | |
| Tokke | Telemark | Vest-Telemark Museum in Eidsborg | |
| Tolga | Hedmark | Tolgen cabin site | |
| Tønsberg | Vestfold | Slottsfjellet, a hill | |
| Torsken | Troms | Grunnfarnes Inlet | |
| Tranøy | Troms | Tranøya, an island | |
| Træna | Nordland | Træna Hall | |
| Trøgstad | Østfold | Skjønhaug torv (Skjønhaug Square) | |
| Tromsø | Troms | Skansen, a redoubt | |
| Trondheim | Sør-Trøndelag | Five different sites in the town | |
| Trysil | Hedmark | Royal Park (Kongeparken) in Nybergsund | |
| Tustna | Møre og Romsdal | Kråksund Fishing Museum | |
| Tvedestrand | Aust-Agder | Town hall and pier | |
| Tydal | Sør-Trøndelag | Brekka Open Air Museum | |
| Tynset | Hedmark | Rambu leisure club | |
| Tysfjord | Nordland | Korsnes historical site | |
| Tysnes | Hordaland | Olav Society settlement at Onarheim | |
| Tysvær | Rogaland | Lars Hertervig Plass (Lars Hertervig Square) next to Aksdal Church | |
| Ullensaker | Akershus | Protected landscape around Nordby Pond | |
| Ullensvang | Hordaland | Utne, a village | |
| Ulstein | Møre og Romsdal | Town hall lawn | |
| Ulvik | Hordaland | The commons | |
| Utsira | Rogaland | The commons in Nordevågen | |
| Vadsø | Finnmark | No site | |
| Værøy | Nordland | Schoolyard at Værøy School | |
| Vågå | Oppland | Vågå Cultural Center | |
| Vågan | Nordland | Vágamot/Storvågan project | Museum homepage |
| Vågsøy | Sogn og Fjordane | Moldøen, an island | |
| Vaksdal | Hordaland | Skipshelleren, a rock overhang | |
| Våle | Vestfold | Våle Parsonage | |
| Våler | Hedmark | Meeting place at the Sparebanken Hedmark premises | |
| Våler | Østfold | The village of Kirkebygden | |
| Valle | Aust-Agder | School area | |
| Vang | Oppland | Høre Stave Church and surrounding area | |
| Vanylven | Møre og Romsdal | No site | |
| Vardø | Finnmark | No site | |
| Vefsn | Nordland | Dolstad Open Air Museum | |
| Vega | Nordland | Vega Open Air Museum | |
| Vegårshei | Aust-Agder | Myra Park | |
| Vennesla | Vest-Agder | Setesdal Line | |
| Verdal | Nord-Trøndelag | Stiklestad | National Cultural Center website |
| Verran | Nord-Trøndelag | No site | |
| Vestby | Akershus | Vestby Parsonage | Municipal website |
| Vestnes | Møre og Romsdal | Area between Kataholmen (a former islet) and the Lars Hammeraas statue on Sjøgata in the village of Helland | |
| Vestre Slidre | Oppland | The Gardberg site with the Einang stone | |
| Vestre Toten Municipality | Oppland | Church stables at Ås Church | |
| Vestvågøy | Nordland | Lofotr Viking Museum in Borg | Museum website |
| Vevelstad | Nordland | Open air museum with surrounding area | |
| Vikna | Nord-Trøndelag | Norveg coastal culture center | Museum website |
| Vik | Sogn og Fjordane | Fridtjofparken (Frithiof Park) in Vangsnes | |
| Vindafjord | Rogaland | Park facility in Sandeid and Joa-Kari Park in Ølen | |
| Vinje | Telemark | Mjonøy cabins | Website |
| Volda | Møre og Romsdal | Uppheimsplassen (Uppheim Park) in downtown Volda | |
| Voss | Hordaland | Voss Church and Prestegardslandet, the adjacent parsonage farm | |
