= Dense Time =

Studio album by Guðlaugur Kristinn Óttarsson
- Released: December 9, 2005
- Recorded: October 19 – November 19, 2005
- Genre: World music
- Length: 47:15
- Label: Pronil Holdings
- Producer: Arnar Guðjónsson, Guðmundur Pétursson and Guðlaugur Kristinn Óttarsson

Guðlaugur Kristinn Óttarsson chronology
Misc. Music (2002)	Dense Time (2005)	Posthumous Art Values

Dense Time is an album released on December 9, 2005 by Icelandic guitar player Guðlaugur Kristinn Óttarsson.

This album contains Guðlaugur's compositions and features some of the most important Icelandic performers, such as Magnús Þór Jónsson (Megas), Björk, Ragnhildur Gísladóttir, among others.

The music ranges from jazz to post-punk and contains references to Bach and ambient music.

== Songs ==
"Zontal" and "Patre" were songs originally recorded when Guðlaugur was playing with singer Björk in a parallel project to their band Kukl known as the Elgar Sisters. Here both songs are performed by Megas. The lyrics of "Patré" were drawn from a poem by Þór Eldon Jónsson plus additional words by Guðlaugur about magic numbers and Platonic polyhedrons. The lyrics for "Zontal" came from a poem by Þór Eldon titled "Horizontal Position" and additional lyrics by Guðlaugur which were derived from a paper about sub-nuclear structures, Platonic numbers and magic numbers.

"The Seventh Seals" was written by Guðlaugur based on the Book of Revelation towards mid-1983 when the band Þeyr dissolved and this work was arranged to be performed in Kukl. The song changed over the years and on this version, healer Brynjólfur Snorrason reads the New Testament.

"Sirius" contains the text from a work by poet Einar Benediktsson and read by Guðlaugur's stepfather Guðmundur Jónsson, a renowned operatic singer.
"Findings" was composed in 1999 and it is Guðlaugur's tribute to the recent deaths of his father, Óttar Hermann Guðlaugsson (1991) and his sister Vivan Hrefna Óttarsdóttir (1995). Performed by Brynjólfur Snorrason, Hafþór Ólafsson (Súkkat) and Magnús Guðmundsson (former singer of Þeyr), this song tells the story of the gods who return from the battle of Ragnarök as accounted on the Song of the Sibyl from the ancient poetic Edda.

"Stefjahreimur" is a work conceived in 1993 and it features Agnar Wilhelm Agnarsson reading a piece from poet Einar Benediktsson. It was a live improvisation in Studio Hljóðhamar.

"Stígðu Mig" and "Síðasta Ég" were both originally recorded in 1986 when Guðlaugur was playing with Björk in The Elgar Sisters. "Stígðu Mig" was featured on Björk's single Venus as a Boy (CD 2), released in August 1993 and "Síðasta Ég" was featured on Björk's single Big Time Sensuality (CD 1), released in November 1993 and the CD box Family Tree which was released in November 2002.

"Partir" was recorded after "Sirius" in 1999. The lyrics are by Megas who also reads the text. This song was originally called "Plasir d'amore". "Essence" was written to get straight to the core of things, from monotony turning into variegated composition.

Dense Time is closed with "Closure" which was created in January 2005 when Guðlaugur was carrying out some improvisation experiments with three dissonant chords. The vocals were added by Guðlaugur, his daughter Hera Þöll, and Katla Rós Völudóttir. It features an unpublished piece from 1998 written after the death of Tómas Gröndal, a close friend.

== Track listing ==
Track	Title	Length	Vocals	Lyrics	Audio clips	Credits
01	Zontal	04:22	Megas	link	full mp3	Vocals: Magnús Þór Jónsson. Lyrics: Þór Eldon Jónsson and Guðlaugur Kristinn Óttarsson. Guitar: Guðlaugur Kristinn Óttarsson. Bass: Birgir Mogensen. Double bass: Georg Bjarnason. Piano and percussion: Davíð Þór Jónsson. DX7: Einar Arnaldur Melax. Kalimba: Sigtryggur Baldursson.
02	Seventh Seal	05:12	Brynjólfur Snorrason, Magnús Guðmundsson and Hafþór Ólafsson	link	-	Vocals: Brynjólfur Snorrason, Hafþór Ólafsson and Magnús Guðmundsson. Vibraphone and arrangement: Guðlaugur Kristinn Óttarsson. Trumpets and horn: Áki Ásgeirsson. Trombone: Ingi Garðar Erlendsson and Magnús Jensson. Church bells: Hörður Áskelsson. Bass: Georg Bjarnason. Drums: Birgir Baldursson.
03	Sirius	04:24	Guðmundur Jónsson	-	-	Lyrics: Einar Benediktsson. Vocals: Guðmundur Jónsson. Guitar and vibraphone: Guðlaugur Kristinn Óttarsson. Steel guitar: Guðmundur Pétursson. Horn: Hákon Leifsson. Bass: Haraldur Þorsteinsson.
04	Patre	03:56	Megas	link	-	Lyrics: Þór Eldon Jónsson and Guðlaugur Kristinn Óttarsson. Vocals: Magnús Þór Jónsson. Guitars: Guðlaugur Kristinn Óttarsson, Guðmundur Pétursson and Þorsteinn Magnússon. Piano: Davíð Þór Jónsson. Bass: Tómas Magnús Tómasson. Drums: Arnar Guðjónsson.
05	Findings	05:52	Hafþór Ólafsson, Magnús Guðmundsson and Brynjólfur Snorrason	-	-	Vocals: Brynjólfur Snorrason, Hafþór Ólafsson and Magnús Guðmundsson. Piano and guitar: Guðlaugur Kristinn Óttarsson. Horn: Hákon Leifsson. Double bass: Georg Bjarnason and Óttar Sæmundsen.
06	Stefjahreimur	06:25	Agnar Wilhelm Agnarsson	-	-	Lyrics: Einar Benediktsson. Vocals and translation: Agnar Wilhelm Agnarsson. Guitar and bass: Guðlaugur Kristinn Óttarsson. Steel guitar: Guðmundur Pétursson. Church bells and drums: Arnar Guðjónsson.
07	Stígðu Mig	01:44	Björk Guðmundsdóttir	link	-	Lyrics: Þór Eldon Jónsson. Vocals and melody: Björk Guðmundsdóttir. Guitar: Guðlaugur Kristinn Óttarsson.
08	Partir	06:04	Megas and Ragnhildur Gísladóttir	-	-	Vocals: Magnús Þór Jónsson and Ragnhildur Gísladóttir. Prose: Magnús Þór Jónsson. Piano and xylophone: Guðlaugur Kristinn Óttarsson. Bass: Georg Bjarnason. Percussion: Davíð Þór Jónsson.
09	Síðasta Ég	02:55	Björk Guðmundsdóttir	link	mp3 sample
10	Essence	04:33	instrumental	-	-	Guitar and sonar: Guðlaugur Kristinn Óttarsson. Percussion, moog and sonar: Davíð Þór Jónsson. Modulator: Guðmundur Pétursson. Synthesizer: Hilmar Örn Hilmarsson. Bass: Tómas Magnús Tómasson.
11	Closure	03:48	Guðlaugur Kristinn Óttarsson, Hera Þöll Guðlaugsdóttir and Katla Rós Völudóttir	-	-	Vocals: Guðlaugur Kristinn Óttarsson, Hera Þöll Guðlaugsdóttir and Katla Rós Völudóttir. Guitar: Guðlaugur Kristinn Óttarsson. Trumpets: Áki Ásgeirsson. Bass: Tómas Magnús Tómasson. Drums: Arnar Guðjónsson.

== Personnel ==
- Producers: Guðlaugur Kristinn Óttarsson, Arnar Guðjónsson and Guðmundur Pétursson.
- Management: Academy of Industry and Arts.
- Album design: GKO & Jón Proppe.
- Booklet: Jón Proppe.
- Publisher: Academy of Industry and Arts.
- Distributor: Smekkleysa.
