= Kittill Kristoffersen Berg =

Norwegian politician (1903–1983)

Kittill Kristoffersen Berg (17 August 1903 – 17 April 1983) was a Norwegian politician for the Communist Party.

He was elected to the Norwegian Parliament from Buskerud in 1945, but was not re-elected in 1949 as the Communist Party dropped from 11 to 0 seats in Parliament.

Berg was born in Rollag and a member of Rollag municipality council during the term 1937–1940, and served as deputy mayor briefly in 1945. He was originally active in the Labour Party, founding the local party chapter in 1925, but founded the local Communist Party chapter in 1945. He was the local party chairman until his death in 1983, and was a member of their national board from 1945 to 1973.

He was also active in trade unions and the Norwegian Farmers and Smallholders Union. He worked as a laborer, log driver and farmer.
