= Petter Dass Museum =

Museum in Alstahaug, Norway

- Petter Dass-museet
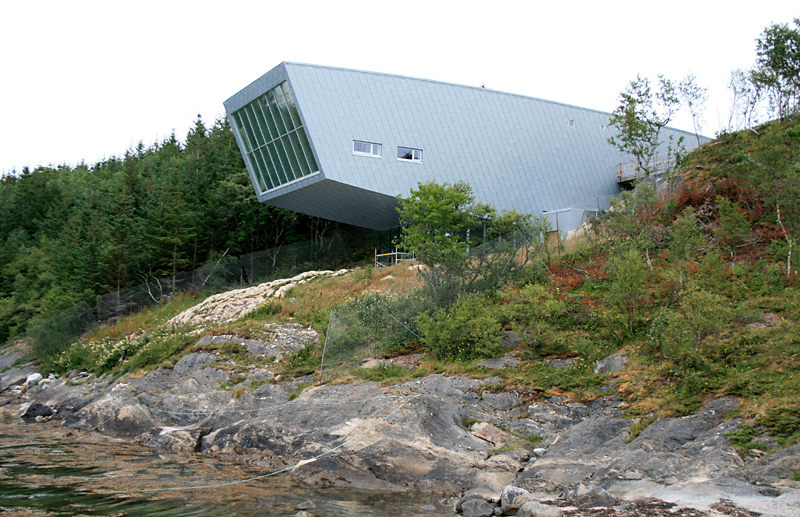
- Museum facing the sea
- Established: 1966
- Location: Alstahaug Municipality, Norway
- Coordinates: 65°53′40″N 12°23′48″E
- Website: www.petterdass.no

The Petter Dass Museum (Norwegian: Petter Dass-museet) in Alstahaug Municipality, Norway is a museum dedicated to the priest and poet Petter Dass.

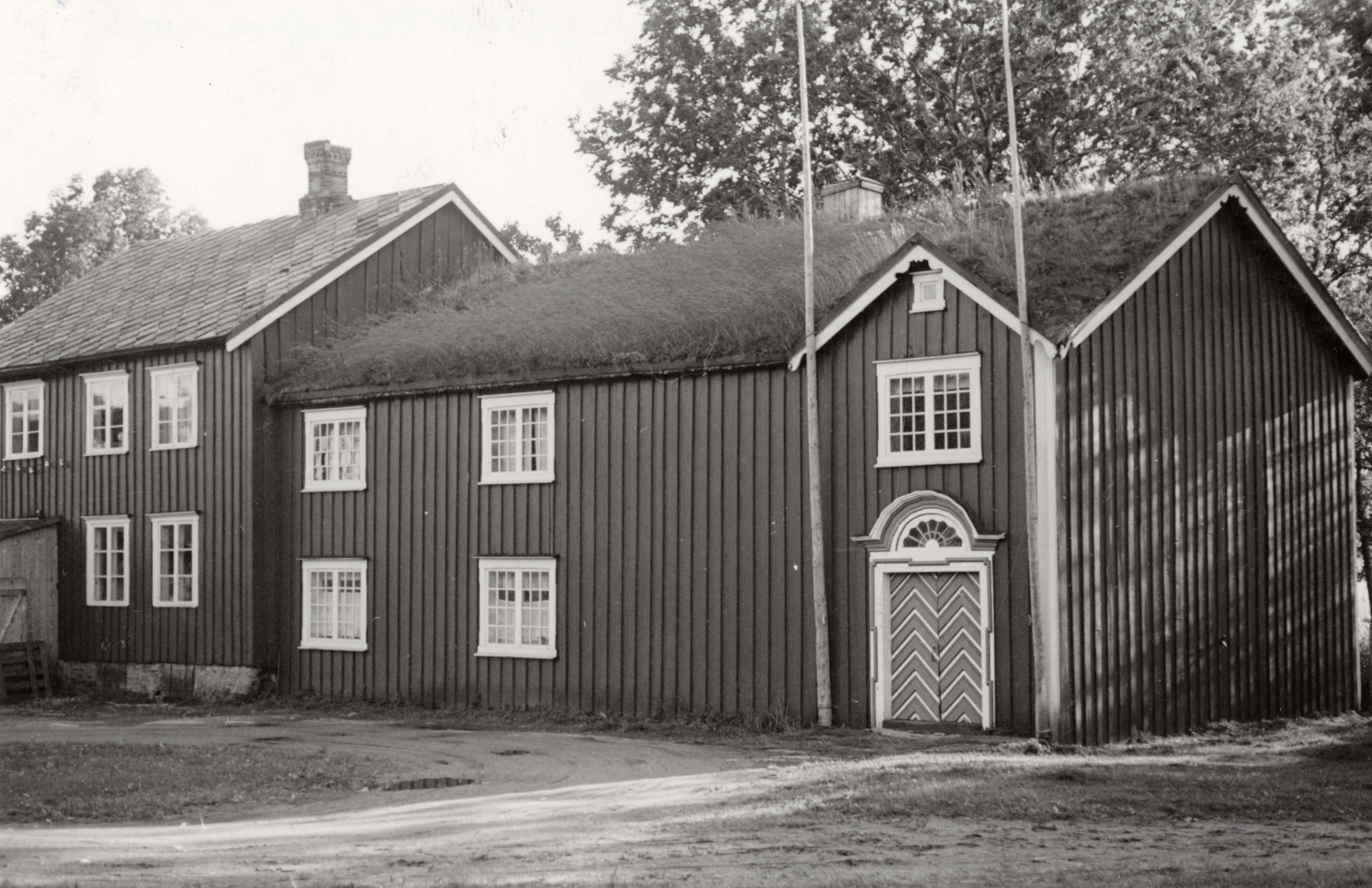
The old parsonage at Alstahaug Church is part of the Petter Dass Museum.

The museum was established in 1966 and is a division of the Helgeland Museum. In 1999, Alstahaug was selected as the millennium site for Nordland county, and the museum played a central role in this.

The museum at Alstahaug consists of several buildings. The oldest buildings comprise the old parsonage, which dates from the first half of the 18th century. The parsonage has rotating exhibitions and interior furnishings from the 16th and 17th century. Regular tours of the parsonage are offered during the summer season. The old buildings are only open during the summer season, from June to August, or by arrangement.

The courtyard at Alstahaug and the nearby area is a recreational area for both local residents and visitors. The courtyard, Alstahaug Church, cemetery, and buildings are protected by the Norwegian Directorate for Cultural Heritage.

A new museum building and parking facilities were started in September 2005. The opening was postponed several times during 2007, and the museum opened on October 20, 2007. The building was designed by the Snøhetta architecture office. The new museum building is open year-round every day except Mondays and certain holidays. The construction of the museum cost about 90 million kr and was funded with support from the municipality, county municipality, and state, as well as private donors.
