= Norveg =

Museum in Rørvik, Norway

Coordinates: 64°51′34″N 11°14′02″E

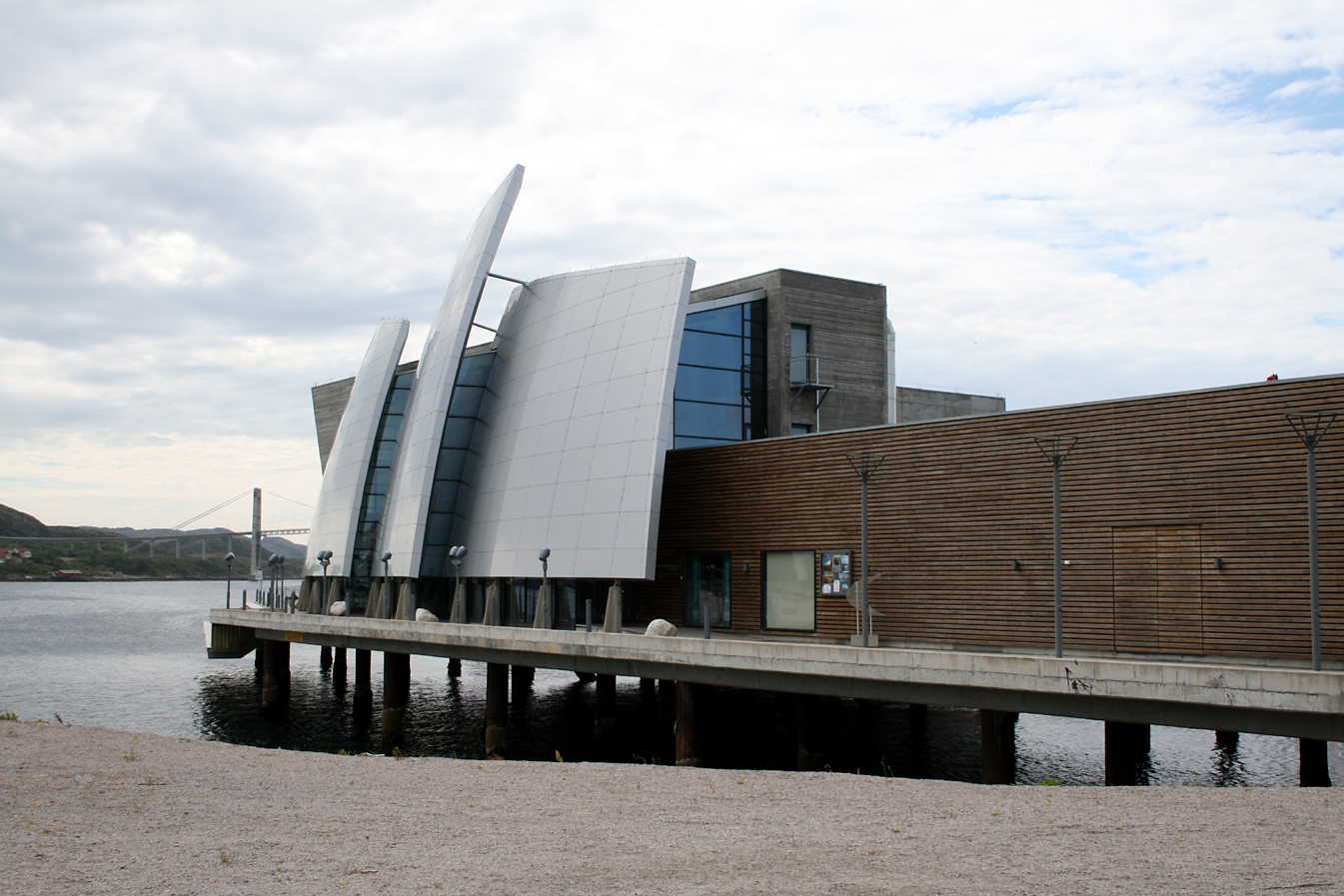
Norveg Coastal Culture and Industry Center

The Norveg Coastal Culture and Industry Center (Norwegian: Norveg – senter for kystkultur og kystnæring) is part of the Nord-Trøndelag Coastal Museum on the island of Inner-Vikna, Norway. Norveg contains historical exhibits, a restaurant, a gallery, and a cultural center. The head of the Nord-Trøndelag Coastal Museum is Charles Utvik.

The museum is located in the municipal center, the town of Rørvik, near the Norwegian Coastal Express, and it is one of the characteristic landmarks along the coast. The museum's new building, which was opened by King Harald V on June 16, 2004, was designed by the architect Guðmundur Jónsson and was nominated for Europe's most important architectural award, the European Union Prize for Contemporary Architecture, in 2005.

The museum's founder, Paul Woxeng (1883–1967), began his cultural-historical collection work in 1919, and in 1932, he built a separate house for the collections on his farm, named Vågsenget. In 1970, the municipality of Vikna purchased the collection, and part of the property was designated a museum. Later, in the 1970s, the Woxeng Collection was moved to the Berggården trading post.

The Nord-Trøndelag Coastal Museum and Norveg comprise a total of about 15 points in Rørvik and Berggården, as well as in Vågsenget and the abandoned fishing village of Sør-Gjæslingen.

Norveg is Nord-Trøndelag's millennium site. The Coastal Museum is a division of the Midt Museum, where Sigmund Alsaker serves as director. The Midt Museum also includes the Norwegian Sawmill Museum, Nord-Trøndelag Art Museum, and Namdal Museum in Namsos, as well as museum sites without staff in six municipalities in Namdalen.
