= Medieval Oslo =

Area with oldest archeological remains in Oslo

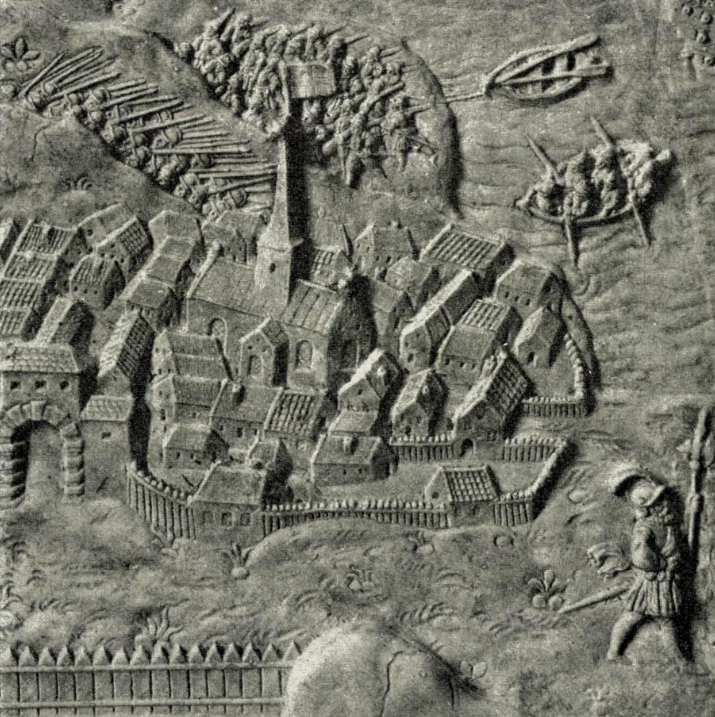
Medieval Oslo, 1567. Detail from a relief on King Frederick II's sarcophagus in Roskilde Cathedral depicting the Swedish siege of Oslo.

Medieval Oslo refers to the urban community of Oslo during the Middle Ages and up until the city fire of 1624, when the town burned to the ground and was not rebuilt on its original site. Instead, the city of Christiania was founded nearby. After this, the original name "Oslo" continued to be used for the original, burned-down area, which was largely converted into farmland. In 1925, the municipality of Christiania changed its name to Oslo, meaning that in modern times, "Oslo" refers to a much larger area than the old medieval town.

The ruins of the medieval town, made of stone and brick, are located in the area now called Gamlebyen ("The Old Town"), roughly bordered by the Hovinbekken stream in the north, the original course of the Alna River to the south and east, and the water features associated with the Medieval Park in the west. The Franciscan monastery (partly overbuilt by Gamlebyen Church and Oslo Hospital) just east of the Alna is also considered part of the Medieval Town, despite being located on the "back side" of the river. Akershus Castle and Fortress (begun in 1297) and Hovedøya with its Cistercian monastery also belong to the Medieval Town.

At the center of the medieval town was Oslo Torg, the city's oldest marketplace. The square was located in the area where today's intersection between Oslo Gate and Bispegata is. The central medieval streets Nordre Strete, Vestre Strete, and Bispeallmenningen all had their starting or ending points at this square.

Surrounding the town was the "Takmark", where the townspeople were free to gather firewood and moss for household use. According to Magnus Lagabøte's city law from around 1276, the border of Oslo's Takmark passed through Tøyen, Galgeberg, to the gate at Vålerenga, then over Ekeberg, out through the bay to Akersneset, and from there back to Tøyen.

Medieval Oslo had its heyday in the decades around the year 1300 when Håkon V Magnusson ruled, first as duke (1284–1299) and then as king (1299–1319).

The medieval town of Oslo had around 3,000 inhabitants around the year 1300, but as a result of the Black Death, the population likely dropped to below one thousand before gradually recovering to about the same level by the 1500s.

== See also ==
- Diocese of Oslo

== Literature ==
- Egil Lindhart Bauer (eds.), Det gamle Oslo 1000–1624, 2024, Cappelen Damm, ISBN 9788202738464
- Arnved Nedkvitne and Per Norseng, Byen under Eikaberg: fra byens oppkomst til 1536, Oslo bys historie, Vol. 1, Oslo 1991
- Nedkvitne, Arnved (2000). Middelalderbyen ved Bjørvika. Cappelen. ISBN 8202191009.
- Bull, Edvard (1922). Kristianias historie. Oslos historie. 1. Oslo: Cappelen.
- Knut Helle, Finn-Einar Eliassen, Jan Eivind Myhre & Ola Svein Stugu, Norsk byhistorie: urbanisering gjennom 1300 år, Oslo 2006
