= Rollag =

Rollag Municipality Rollag kommune
- Municipality
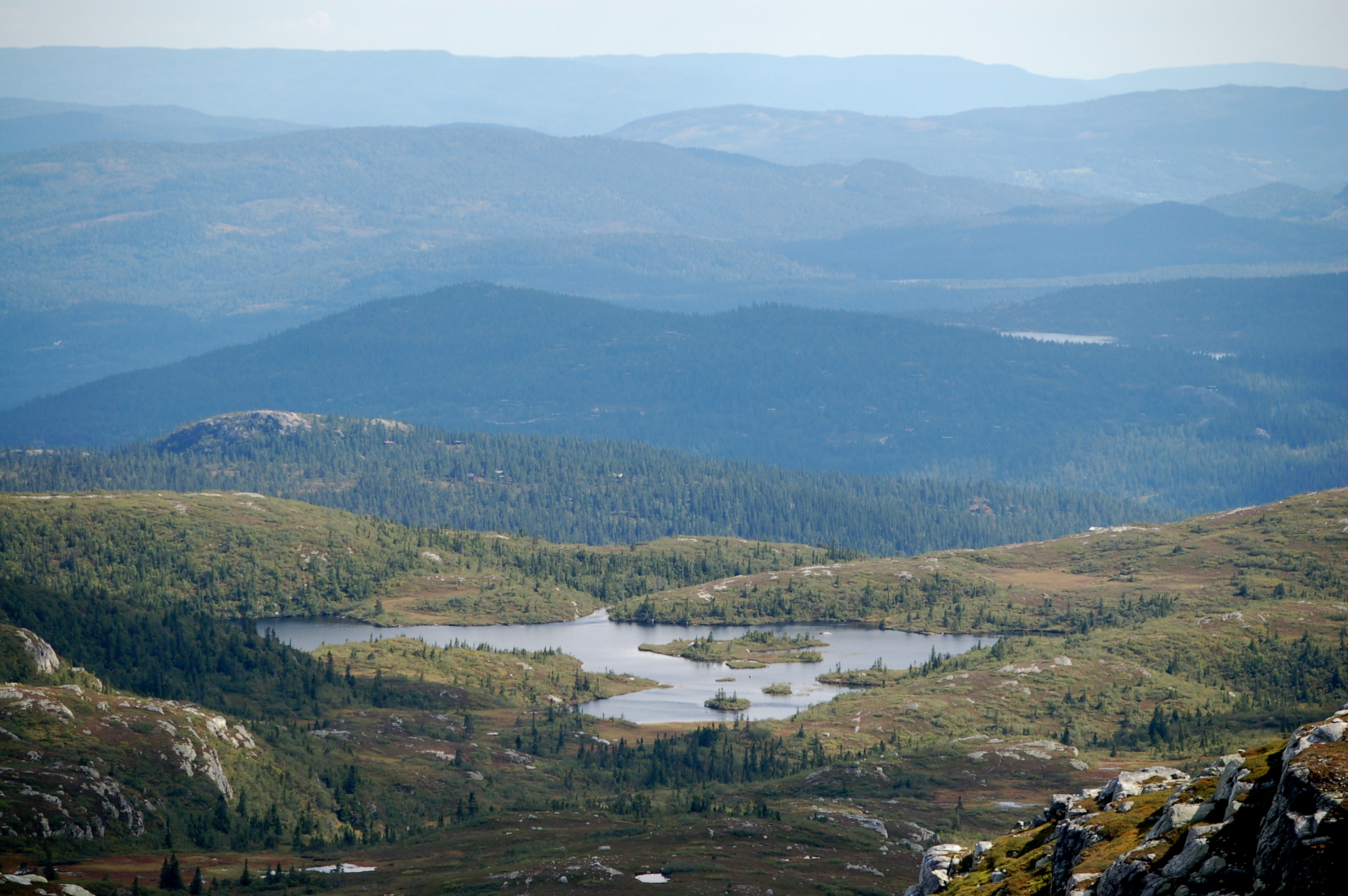

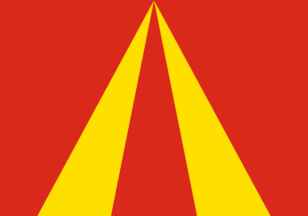
- Flag Coat of arms

- Buskerud within Norway

- Rollag within Buskerud
- Coordinates: 60°1′2″N 9°14′2″E
- Country: Norway
- County: Buskerud
- District: Numedal
- Administrative centre: Rollag

Government
  - Mayor (2003): Steinar Berthelsen (Ap)

Area
  - Total: 449 km^{2} (173 sq mi)
  - Land: 430 km^{2} (170 sq mi)
  - Rank: #225 in Norway

Population (2021)
  - Total: 1,369
  - Rank: #369 in Norway
  - Density: 3/km^{2} (7.8/sq mi)
  - Change (10 years): ▼ −0.9%
- Demonym: Rølling

Official language
  - Norwegian form: Neutral
- Time zone: UTC+01:00 (CET)
  - Summer (DST): UTC+02:00 (CEST)
- ISO 3166 code: NO-3336
- Website: Official website

Rollag is a municipality in Buskerud county, Norway. It is part of the traditional region of Numedal. The administrative centre of the municipality is the village of Rollag, although the most populated area in the municipality is Veggli. Rollag is bordered in the north by Nore og Uvdal, in the east by Sigdal Municipality, in the south by Flesberg Municipality, and in the west by Tinn Municipality in Telemark.

== General information ==
=== History ===
The municipality (originally the parish) is named after the old Rollag farm (Old Norse: Roll(u)lag), since the first church was built here. The first element is probably (the genitive case of) a river name Rolla (now called the Troelva river) and the last element is lag which means "fishing place".

The municipality of Rollag was established on 1 January 1838 (see formannskapsdistrikt). Nore og Uvdal was separated from Rollag in 1858. The coat-of-arms is from modern times. They were granted in 1993. The arms show two gold-colored lines on a red background. The lines represent an old warning cairn made of timber.

Number of minorities (1st and 2nd generation) in Rollag by country of origin in 2017
Ancestry	Number
Somalia	31
Eritrea	17
Lithuania	15

== Geography ==
The municipality lies in the heart of the Numedal traditional region and valley, the westernmost valley in southeastern Norway. The river Numedalslågen flows through Rollag and into the Ytre Oslofjord at Larvik. In the northwest of the Rollag lie the Vegglifjell mountains, which are an entryway into the Hardangervidda. The municipality's highest point is Storegrønut at 1,289 metres (4,229 ft) located in the Vegglifjell mountains.

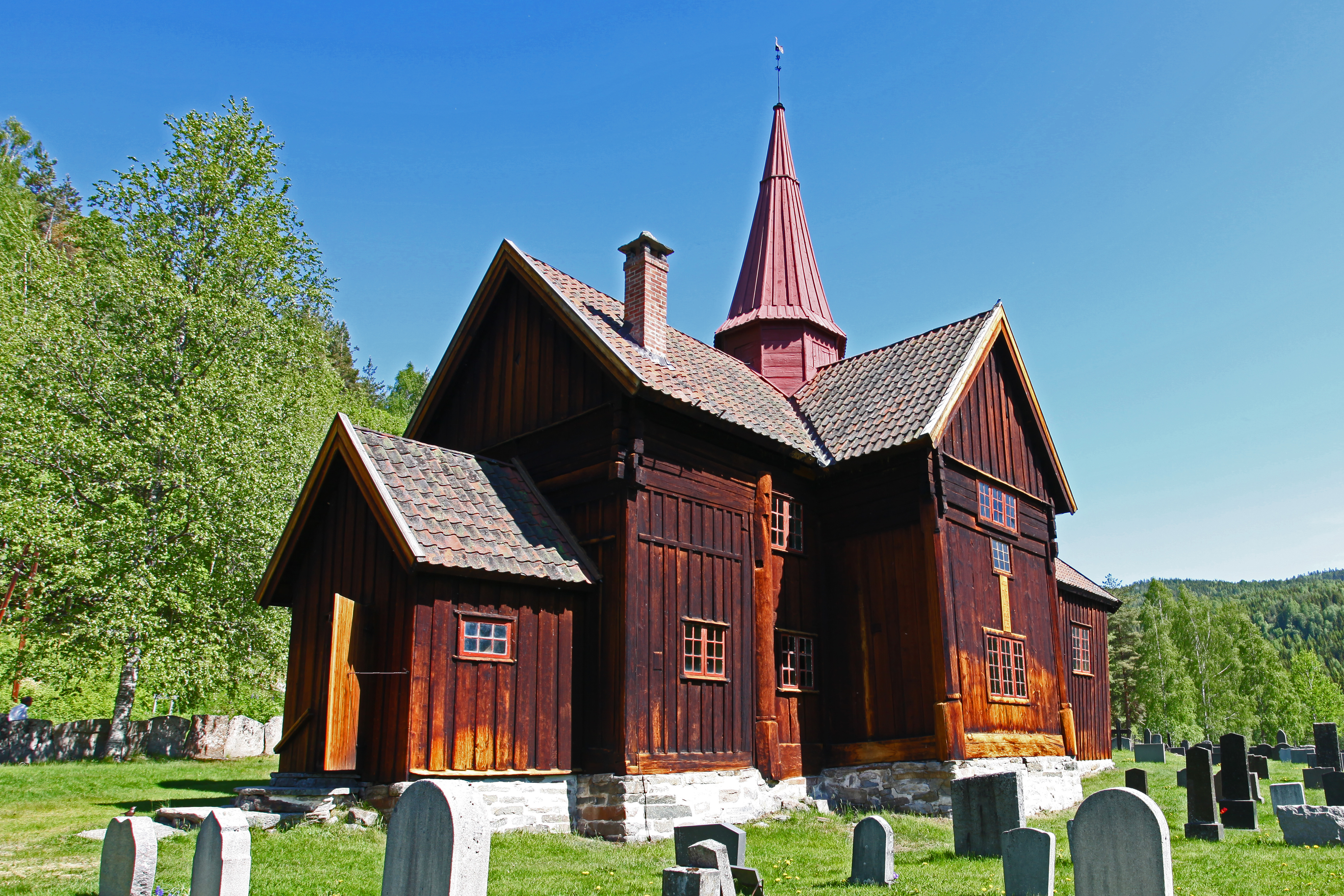
Rollag stave church

=== Climate ===
Climate data for Veggli II 1991–2020 (275 m, average high/low 2007-2025)
Month	Jan	Feb	Mar	Apr	May	Jun	Jul	Aug	Sep	Oct	Nov	Dec	Year
Mean daily maximum °C (°F)	−1.1 (30.0)	0.7 (33.3)	5.9 (42.6)	10.9 (51.6)	16.3 (61.3)	20.7 (69.3)	22.2 (72.0)	20.1 (68.2)	16.1 (61.0)	9.2 (48.6)	2.9 (37.2)	−0.7 (30.7)	10.3 (50.5)
Daily mean °C (°F)	−4.1 (24.6)	−3.7 (25.3)	−0.1 (31.8)	4.4 (39.9)	9.4 (48.9)	13.6 (56.5)	15.9 (60.6)	14.2 (57.6)	10.2 (50.4)	4.3 (39.7)	−0.4 (31.3)	−3.9 (25.0)	5.0 (41.0)
Mean daily minimum °C (°F)	−7.9 (17.8)	−7 (19)	−3.7 (25.3)	−0.3 (31.5)	4 (39)	8.4 (47.1)	10.7 (51.3)	9.3 (48.7)	6.3 (43.3)	1.5 (34.7)	−2.8 (27.0)	−7.1 (19.2)	0.9 (33.7)
Average precipitation mm (inches)	50 (2.0)	31 (1.2)	35 (1.4)	37 (1.5)	59 (2.3)	77 (3.0)	95 (3.7)	95 (3.7)	78 (3.1)	76 (3.0)	71 (2.8)	47 (1.9)	751 (29.6)
Source 1: yr.no (mean, precipitation)
Source 2: seklima (average high/low)

== Rollag stave church ==
Rollag stave church (Rollag stavkirke) was built around 1150–1200. It is located a few kilometres north of the centre of Rollag. It was extended and windows were added in 1652. A new Apse was added in 1666. The transept was constructed in 1697–1698. A gallery was added in 1702. The sacristy was built in 1739. A Baroque pulpit was added in 1763.

== Sister cities ==
The following cities are twinned with Rollag:

- Jokioinen, Southern Finland, Finland

== Notable people ==
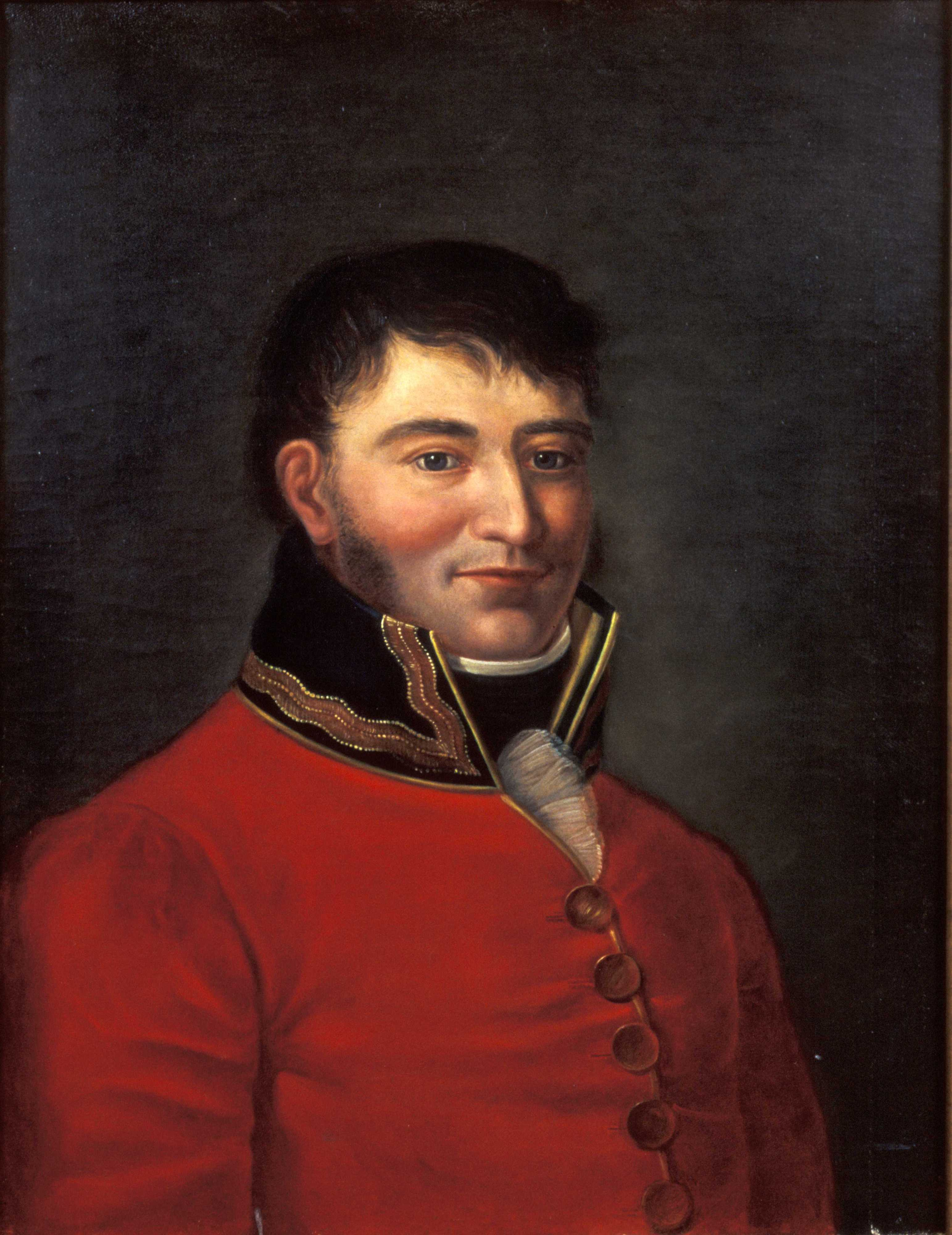
Niels Andreas Vibe

- Niels Andreas Vibe (1759 in Rollag – 1814) a Norwegian military officer, civil and royal servant
- Ole Knudsen Nattestad (1807 in Veggli – 1886) a Norwegian-American pioneer immigrant settler
- Christian Sparre (1859–1940) a Commanding Admiral and politician; brought up in Rollag
- Herbrand Lofthus (1889 in Veggli 1972) a lightweight Greco-Roman wrestler, competed at the 1912 Summer Olympics
- Kittill Kristoffersen Berg (1903 in Rollag – 1983) a labourer, log driver, farmer and politician
- Halvor Kongsjorden (1911 in Veggli – 1990) a sport shooter, Olympic competitor in 1948 and a Norwegian resistance member
- Ragnar Tveiten (born 1938 in Veggli) a former Norwegian biathlete
