= Rollag Stave Church =

Church in Buskerud, Norway

- Rollag stavkirke
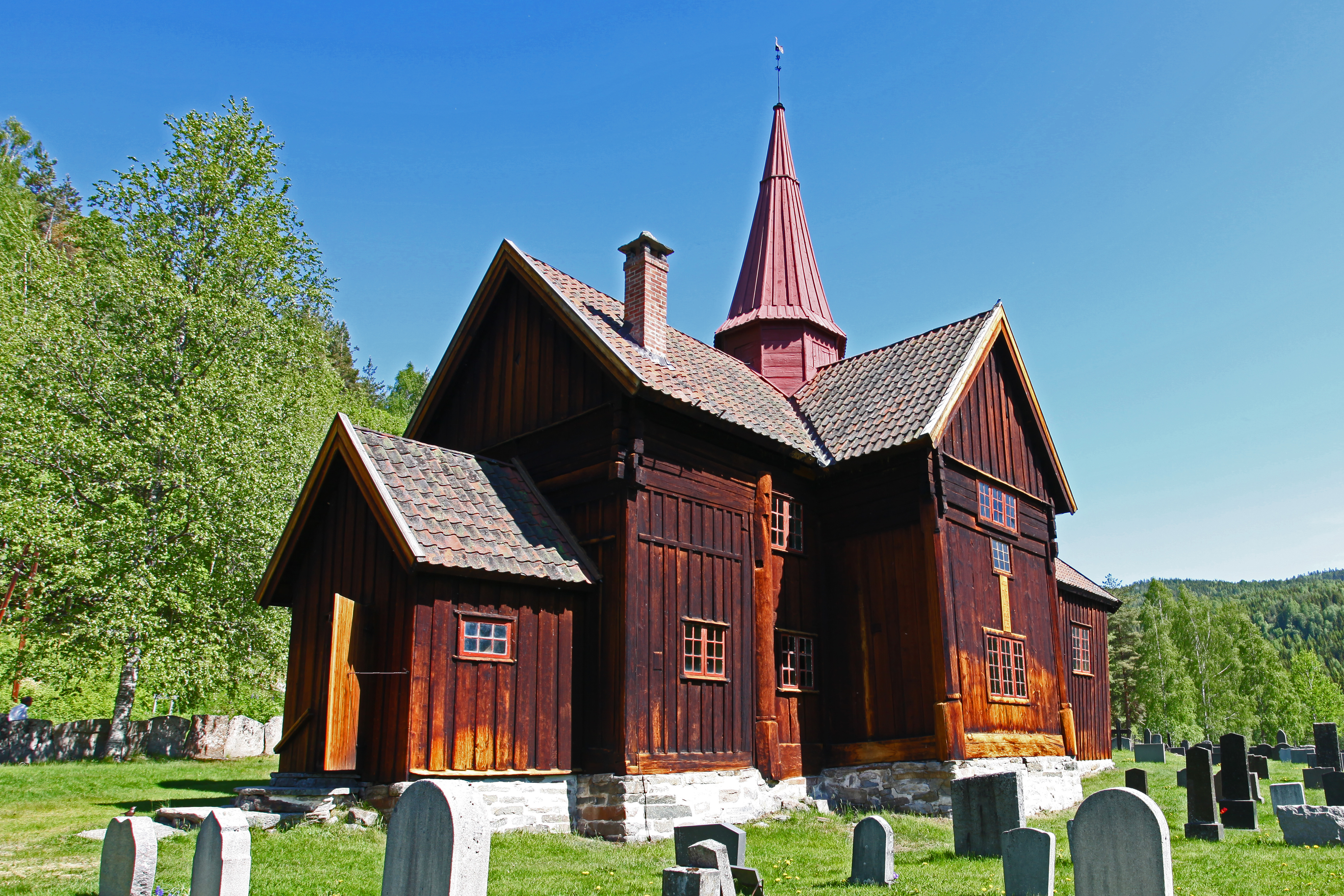
- View of the church
- Rollag Stave Church
- 60°01′16″N 9°16′23″E
- Location: Rollag Municipality, Buskerud
- Country: Norway
- Denomination: Church of Norway
- Previous denomination: Catholic Church
- Churchmanship: Evangelical Lutheran

History
- Status: Parish church
- Founded: c. 1250
- Consecrated: c. 1250

Architecture
- Functional status: Active
- Architectural type: Cruciform
- Completed: c. 1250 (776 years ago)

Specifications
- Capacity: 160
- Materials: Wood

Administration
- Diocese: Tunsberg
- Deanery: Kongsberg prosti
- Parish: Rollag
- Norwegian Cultural Heritage Site
- Type: Church
- Status: Automatically protected
- ID: 85311

Rollag Stave Church (Norwegian: Rollag stavkirke) is a parish church of the Church of Norway in Rollag Municipality in Buskerud county, Norway. It is located about 5 kilometres (3.1 mi) north of the village of Rollag. It is the church for the Rollag parish which is part of the Kongsberg prosti (deanery) in the Diocese of Tunsberg. The white, wooden church was built in a cruciform stave church design around the year 1250. The church seats about 160 people.

== History ==
The earliest existing historical records of the church date back to the year 1425, but the church was not built that year. Rollag Stave Church was probably originally built between 1250 and 1300. The church was originally a simple long church with rectangular choir, but over time it has been enlarged and changed. It is decorated with a mixture of artistic expressions from a series of periods from the early Middle Ages.

The church has been remodeled several times which has left very little remaining of the original building. In 1666, a new choir and apse was added. In 1697-1698, transepts were constructed, creating a cruciform design. A second-floor seating gallery was added in 1702. The sacristy was rebuilt in 1739. Around 1760, an additional lining wall was placed on top of the structure and the church was extended to the west. A Baroque pulpit was added in 1763.

In 1814, this church served as an election church (Norwegian: valgkirke). Together with more than 300 other parish churches across Norway, it was a polling station for elections to the 1814 Norwegian Constituent Assembly which wrote the Constitution of Norway. This was Norway's first national election. Each church parish was a constituency that elected people called "electors" who later met together in each county to elect the representatives for the assembly that was to meet at Eidsvoll Manor later that year.

Architect and art historian Herman Major Schirmer conducted surveys of Rollag Stave Church in 1911 while he chaired the Society for the Preservation of Ancient Norwegian Monuments. Rollag Stave Church underwent restoration work in 1932.

== Gallery ==
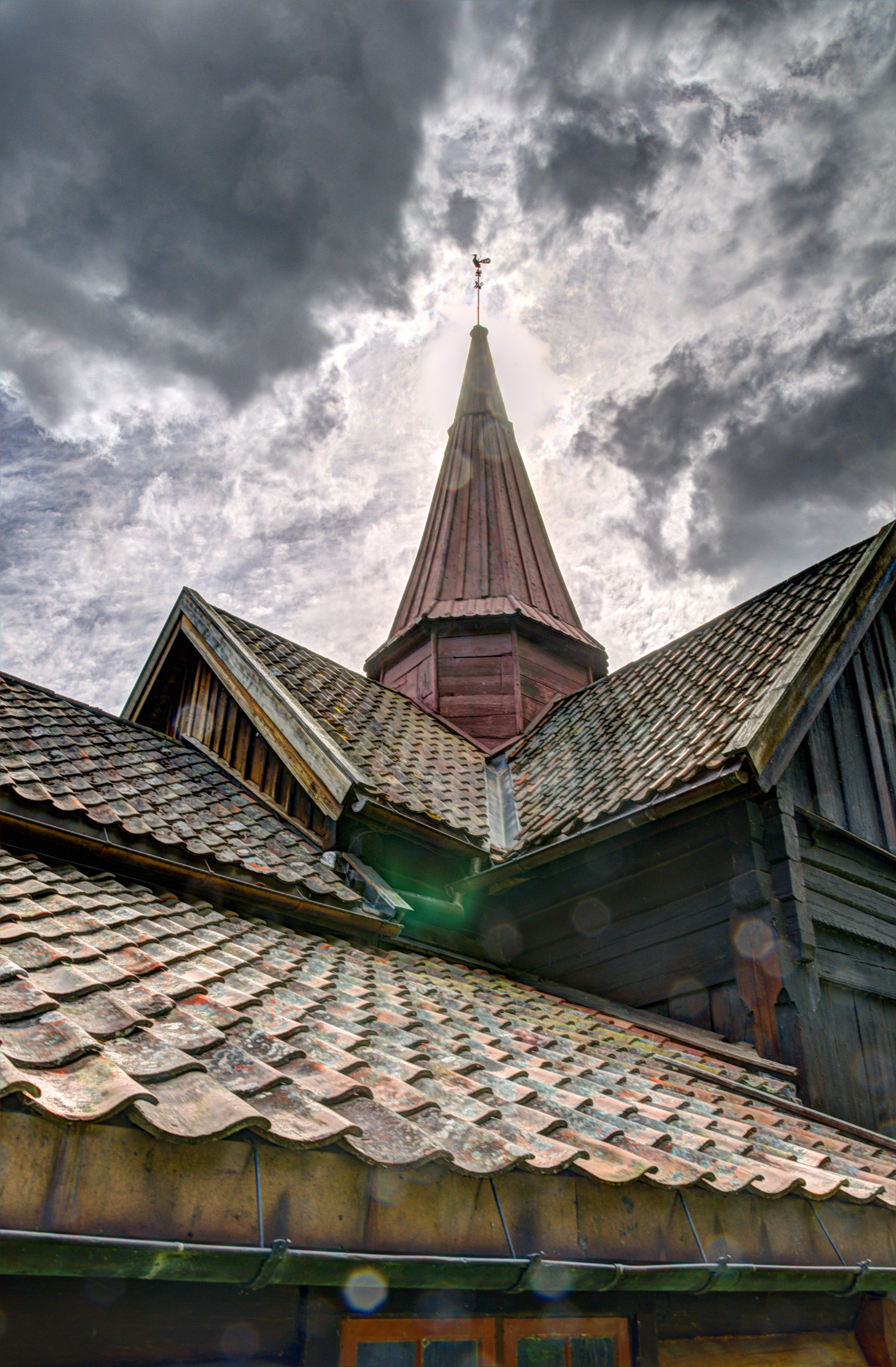
Rollag stave church steeple

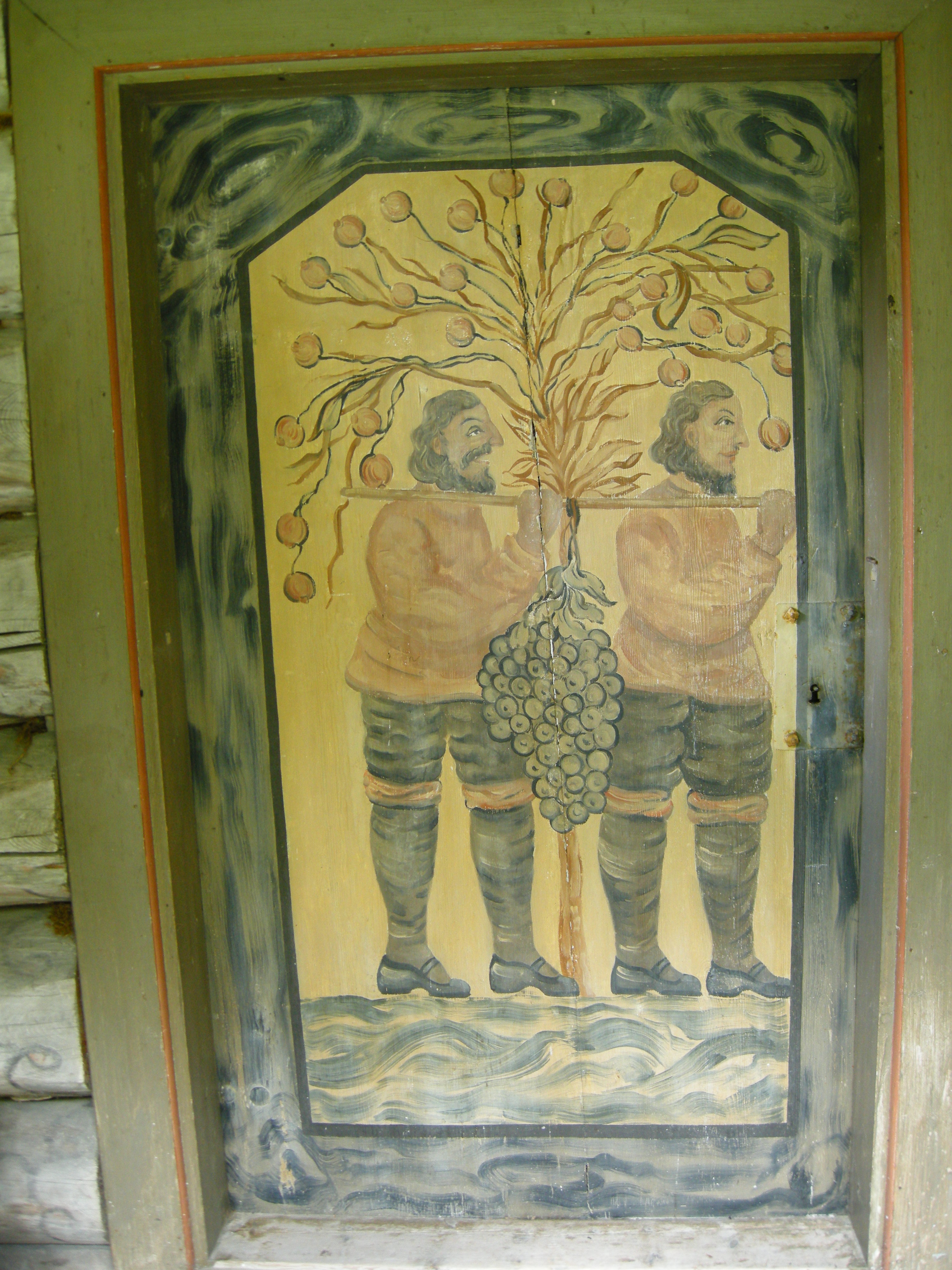
Decorated door to the church

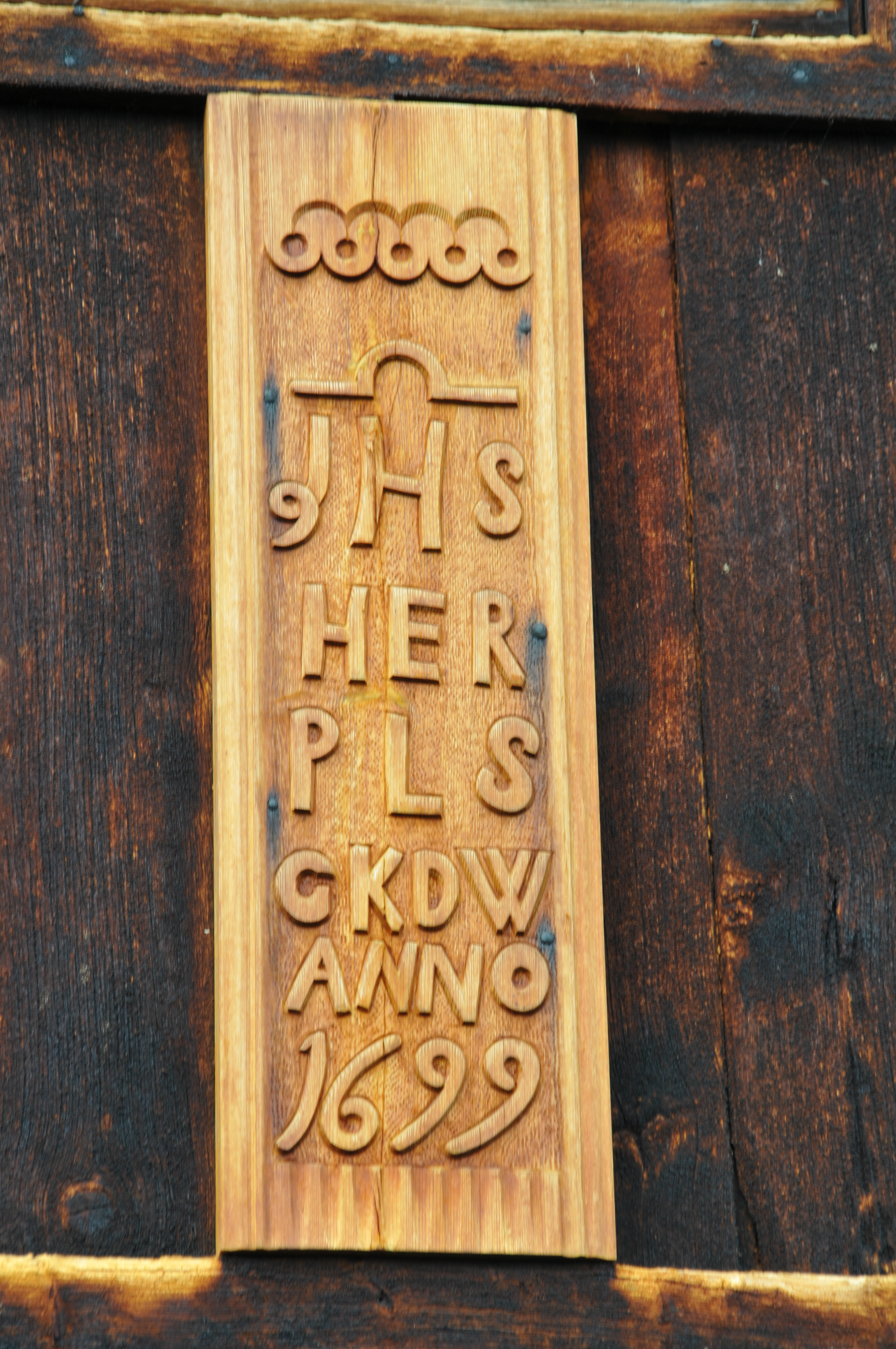
Decorative art work

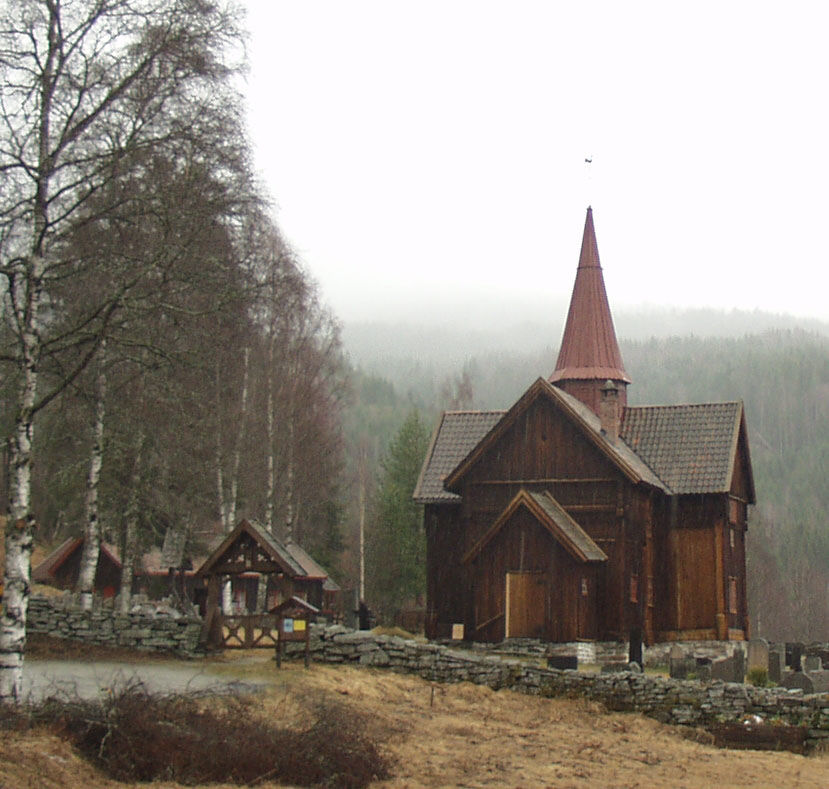
Churchyard

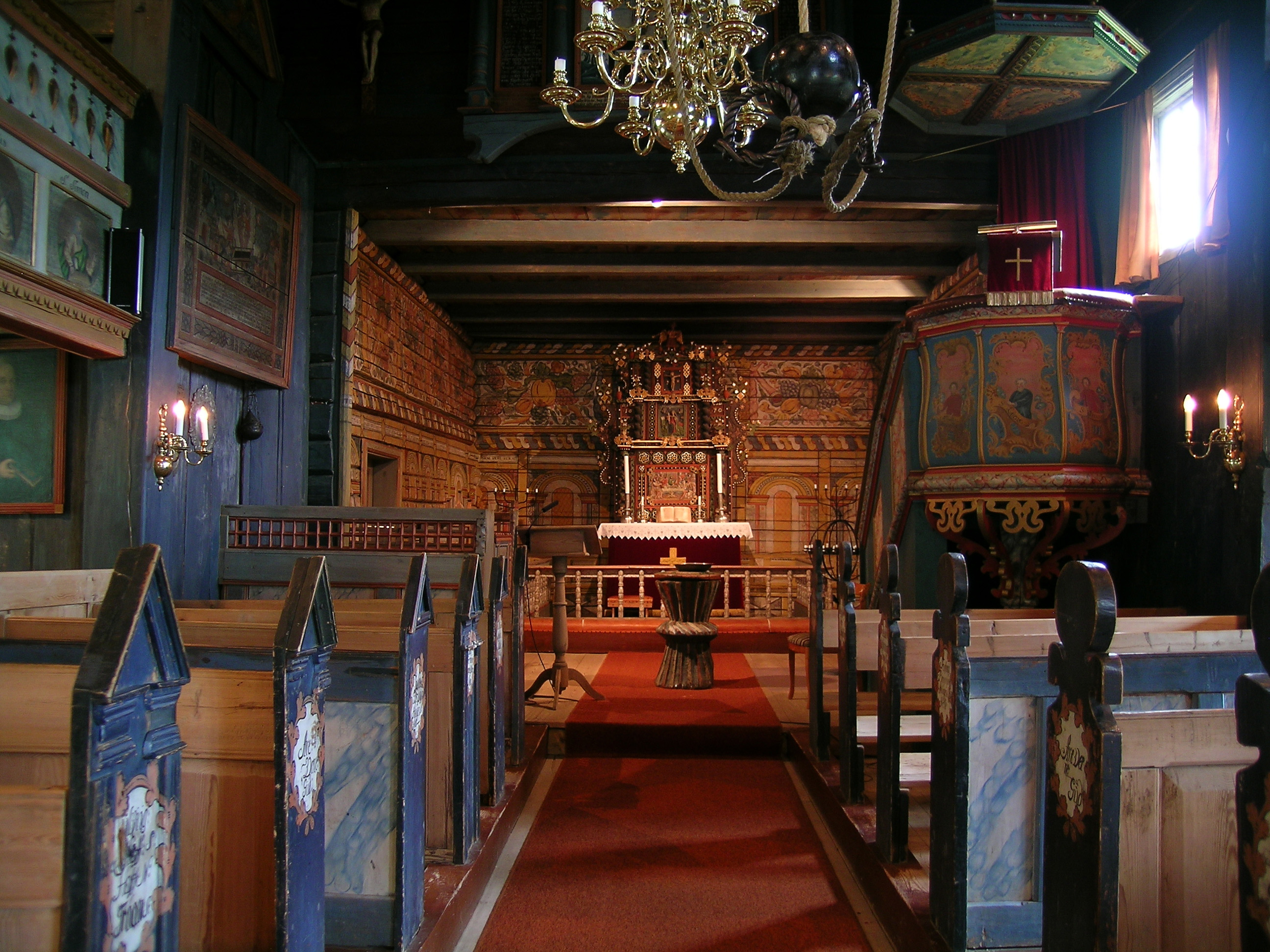
Interior

== See also ==
- List of churches in Tunsberg

== Other sources ==
- Leif Anker (2005) The Norwegian Stave Churches (Oslo: Arfo Forlag) ISBN 978-8291399294
