= Guðmundur Jónsson =

Icelandic architect (born 1953)

Guðmundur Jónsson (born 11 December 1953) is an Icelandic architect who lives in Norway.

He was educated at the Oslo School of Architecture and Design (1975–1981) and ILAUD (International Laboratory of Architecture and Urban Design) in Italy in autumn 1979. He practiced with Lund & Slatto and Eliassen and Lamertz-Nilssen in Oslo from 1981 to 1987 and established Gudmundur Jonsson Arkitektkontor in the same year. His most notable designs are the Norveg Coastal Culture and Industry Center in Rørvik, Hardangervidda Nasjonalparksenter, Norsk Fjordsenter in Geiranger, Søsterskipet in Rørvik, and the library in Akureyri, Iceland.

Of all his works, his best-known are the Ibsenmuseet in Oslo and Norgeshistorisk utstilling in Maihaugen, Lillehammer.

== Prizes ==
Guðmundur was nominated for the prestigious European architecture prize Mies van der Rohe.
