= Kvernhøe =

Mountain in Innlandet, Norway

- Interactive map of the mountain

Highest point
- Elevation: 1,686 m (5,531 ft)
- Prominence: 83 m (272 ft)
- Parent peak: Gråhøe
- Isolation: 0.873 km (0.542 mi)
- Coordinates: 61°22′39″N 8°58′02″E

Geography
- Location: Innlandet, Norway

Kvernhøe is a mountain in Øystre Slidre Municipality in Innlandet county, Norway. The 1,686-metre (5,531 ft) tall mountain is located about 14 kilometres (8.7 mi) northeast of the village of Beitostølen. The mountain is surrounded by several other notable mountains including Heimdalshøe to the north, Gråhøe to the northeast, Bitihorn to the southwest, and Raslet to the west. The lake Vinstre lies to the south. The mountain sits on the eastern edge of the Valdresflye plateau.

== See also ==
- List of mountains of Norway by height
