= Raslet =

Mountain in Innlandet, Norway

- Interactive map of the mountain

Highest point
- Elevation: 1,852 m (6,076 ft)
- Prominence: 38 m (125 ft)
- Parent peak: Vestre Kalvehøgde
- Isolation: 1.4 km (0.87 mi)
- Coordinates: 61°23′13″N 8°44′25″E

Geography
- Location: Innlandet, Norway
- Parent range: Jotunheimen

Raslet is a mountain on the border of Øystre Slidre Municipality and Vang Municipality in Innlandet county, Norway. The 1,852-metre (6,076 ft) tall mountain is located in the Jotunheimen mountains, on the western edge of the Valdresflye plateau. It sits about 20 kilometres (12 mi) northwest of the village of Beitostølen. The mountain is surrounded by several other notable mountains including Rasletinden to the northwest, Nørdre Kalvehølotinden to the west, Bitihorn to the south, Gråhøe and Kvernhøe to the east, and Heimdalshøe to the northeast.

== See also ==
- List of mountains of Norway by height
