= Dyrtjørnhøe =

Mountain in Innlandet, Norway

- Dyrtjørnhøa; Dyrtjørnhøi (unofficial)
- Interactive map of the mountain

Highest point
- Elevation: 1,687 m (5,535 ft)
- Prominence: 685 m (2,247 ft)
- Isolation: 9.2 km (5.7 mi) to Sikkilsdalshøa
- Coordinates: 61°35′09″N 9°03′39″E

Geography
- Location: Innlandet, Norway
- Parent range: Jotunheimen

Dyrtjørnhøe is a mountain in Vågå Municipality in Innlandet county, Norway. The 1,687-metre (5,535 ft) tall mountain is located in the Jotunheimen mountains on the east side of the Sjodalen valley. The mountain sits about 32 kilometres (20 mi) south of the village of Vågåmo and about 40 kilometres (25 mi) north of the village of Beitostølen. The mountain is surrounded by several other notable mountains including Gravdalsknappen and Ingulssjøhøi to the southwest, Besshøe and Besseggen to the west, and Nautgardstinden to the northwest.

== See also ==
- List of mountains of Norway by height
