= Sikkilsdalen =

Valley in Innlandet, Norway

- Sikilsdalen
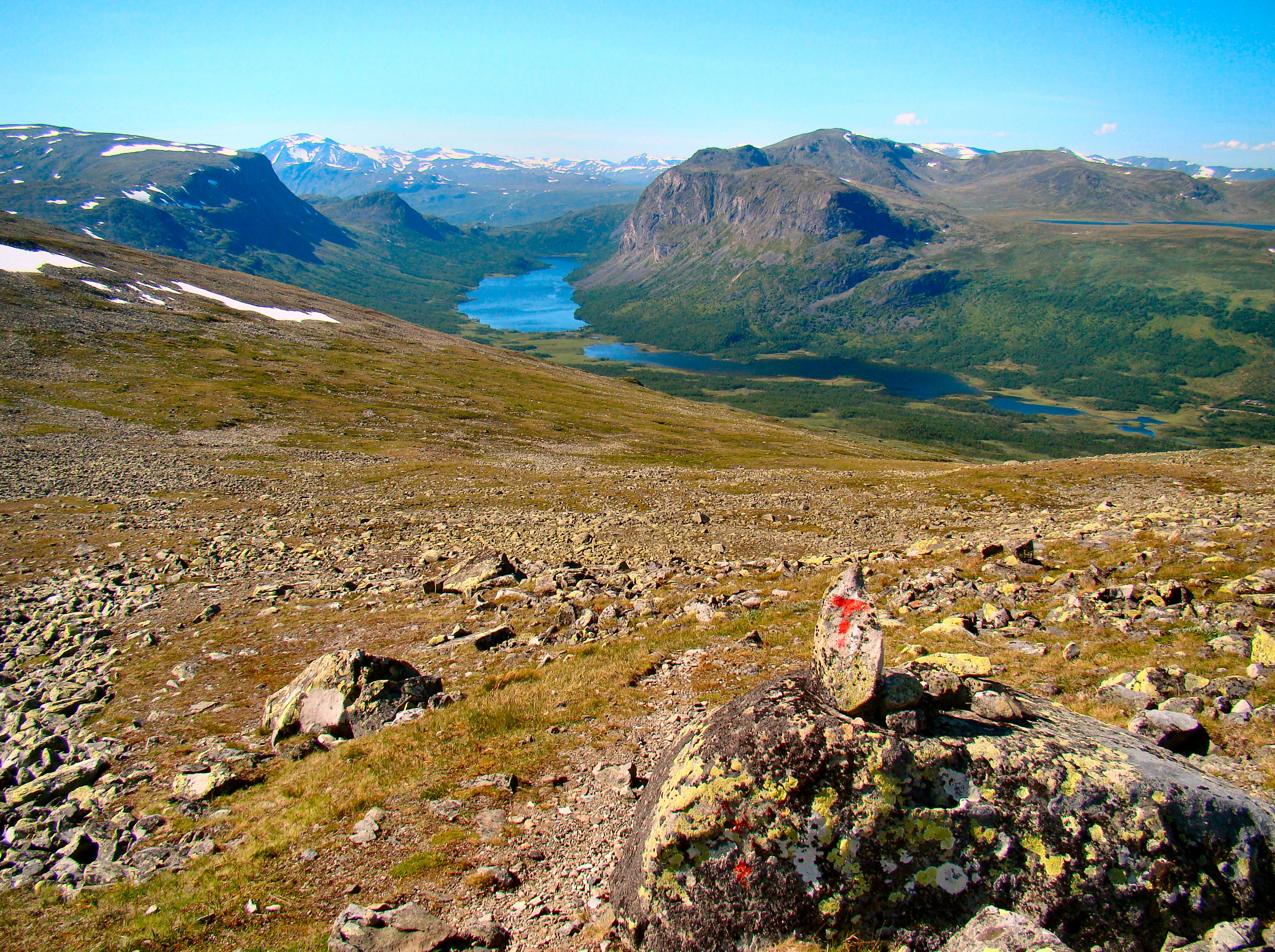
- Sikkilsdalen seen from the southeast of the mountain Vangstulkampen. At the end of the lake in the right edge of the image is the Royal Mountain Chalet, Prinsehytta.
- Floor elevation: 900–1,000 m (3,000–3,300 ft)
- Length: 15 km (9.3 mi) west to east
- Width: 1.5 kilometres (0.93 mi)

Geology
- Type: River valley

Geography
- Location: Innlandet, Norway
- Coordinates: 61.46901°N 9.00046°E
- River: Sikkilsdalsåa river

Location
- Interactive map of the valley

Sikkilsdalen is a valley in Nord-Fron Municipality in Innlandet county, Norway. The valley is located in the eastern part of the Jotunheimen mountains, about 40 kilometres (25 mi) to the southwest of the town of Otta. The valley is surrounded by several notable mountains including Heimdalshøe, Sikkilsdalshøa, Gravdalsknappen, and Ingulssjøhøi.

The Sikkilsdalen valley is used as grazing land for horses in the summer. The Royal Mountain Chalet, Prinsehytta, belonging to the Norwegian royal family is located in Sikkilsdalen.
