= Ingulssjøhøi =

Mountain in Innlandet, Norway

- Ingulsjøhø
- Interactive map of the mountain

Highest point
- Elevation: 1,665 m (5,463 ft)
- Prominence: 155 m (509 ft)
- Parent peak: Sikkilsdalshøa
- Isolation: 1.5 km (0.93 mi)
- Coordinates: 61°31′16″N 9°00′02″E

Geography
- Location: Innlandet, Norway
- Parent range: Jotunheimen

Ingulssjøhøi is a mountain on the border of Nord-Fron Municipality and Vågå Municipality in Innlandet county, Norway. The 1,665-metre (5,463 ft) tall mountain is located in the Jotunheimen mountains on the north side of the Sikkilsdalen valley. The mountain sits about 40 kilometres (25 mi) south of the village of Vågåmo and about 30 kilometres (19 mi) north of the village of Beitostølen. The mountain is surrounded by several other notable mountains including Dyrtjørnhøi to the northeast; Sikkilsdalshøa, Gravdalsknappen, Styggehøe, and Heimdalshøe to the southwest; and Besshø to the west.

== See also ==
- List of mountains of Norway by height
