= Gravdalsknappen =

Mountain in Innlandet, Norway

- Gravdalshø
- Interactive map of the mountain

Highest point
- Elevation: 1,695 m (5,561 ft)
- Prominence: 60 m (200 ft)
- Parent peak: Sikkilsdalshøa
- Isolation: 0.76 km (0.47 mi)
- Coordinates: 61°30′47″N 8°58′19″E

Geography
- Location: Innlandet, Norway
- Parent range: Jotunheimen

Gravdalsknappen is a mountain on the border of Nord-Fron Municipality and Vågå Municipality in Innlandet county, Norway. The 1,695-metre (5,561 ft) tall mountain is located in the Jotunheimen mountains on the north side of the Sikkilsdalen valley. The mountain sits about 40 kilometres (25 mi) south of the village of Vågåmo and about 30 kilometres (19 mi) north of the village of Beitostølen. The mountain is surrounded by several other notable mountains including Ingulssjøhøi and Dyrtjørnhøi to the northeast; Sikkilsdalshøa, Styggehøe, and Heimdalshøe to the southwest; and Besshø to the west.

== See also ==
- List of mountains of Norway by height
