= Bitihorn =

Mountain in Innlandet, Norway

- Bitihodn / Bitihødn
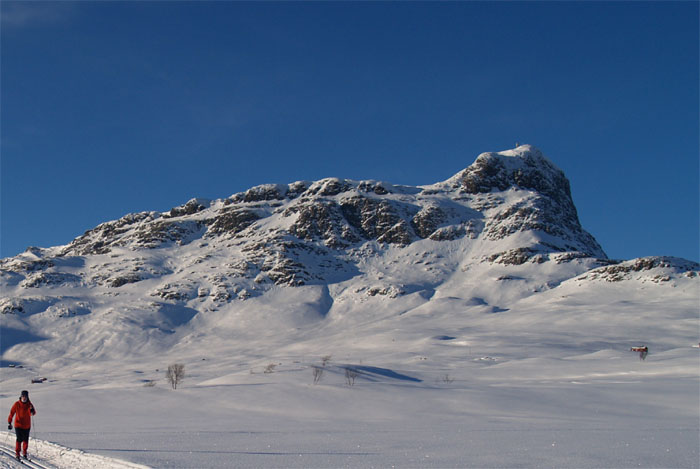
- Bitihorn in the winter from southeast.

Highest point
- Elevation: 1,608 m (5,276 ft)
- Prominence: 508 m (1,667 ft)
- Isolation: 8 km (5.0 mi)
- Coordinates: 61°17′40″N 8°47′58″E

Geography
- Interactive map of the mountain
- Location: Innlandet, Norway
- Parent range: Jotunheimen
- Topo map: 1617 IV Gjende and 1617 III Vangsmjøsi

Climbing
- First ascent: 1811 by Christen Smith (botanist)
- Easiest route: Hike

Bitihorn (locally [ˈbîːtɪhœdn̩]) is a mountain on the border of Vang Municipality and Øystre Slidre Municipality in Innlandet county, Norway. The 1,608-metre (5,276 ft) tall mountain is located in the Jotunheimen mountains about 7 kilometres (4.3 mi) northwest of the village of Beitostølen. The mountain is surrounded by several other notable mountains including Rasletinden and Raslet to the north, Gråhøi and Kvernhøi to the northeast, and Skaget to the east. It is situated on the west side of Norwegian County Road 51, and because of its location, it is a landmark for tourists following that popular driving route.

== Geology ==
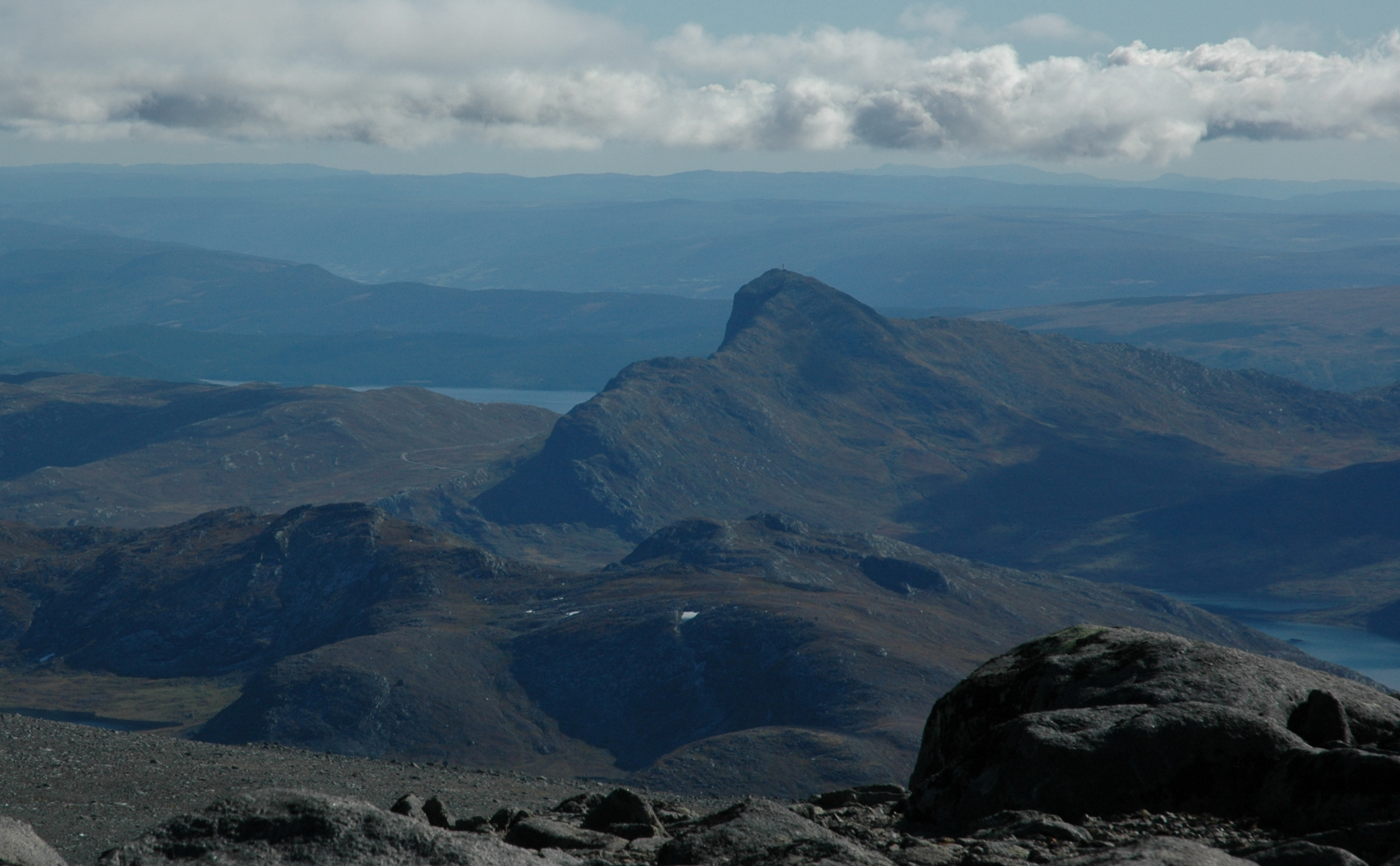
Bitihorn seen from above and northeast.

The mountain is steep towards south and east, and there is a subtle change in the rock layers between the sparagmite foundation and the summit which consists of the much harder gabbro rock. The summit is one of the southernmost outcrops of gabbro in the vicinity, and Bitihorn is therefore significantly higher than its neighbors to the south and east. Underneath the sparagmite layer, lies a layer of extremely nutritious slate, called phyllite. That layer and its subsequent plant cover is the reason for the many mountain pastures in the area.

It is also quite easy to see how the different rock layers have been pushed upon each other from a north-northwest direction, so that the northern slope is quite easy, whereas the southern (and in this case the eastern) is extremely steep. This can be seen in all the neighboring peaks, like Skyrifjell, Heklefjell and Olefjell.

== History ==
In 1811, the peak was climbed for the first time in recorded history by the botanist Christen Smith. Except for the expedition by Jens Esmark in 1798 this biological expedition was the first mountaineering effort in Norway. Smith also climbed the much higher Besshøe, further north.

Tourism soared in the late 19th century after the erection of Raudfjordheim lodge and later the hotels Bygdin and Bygdisheim in the vicinity. The extraordinary scenery attracted tourists from far away, among them queen Wilhelmine of the Netherlands, who stayed at Bygdisheim. In 1905 the boat route on lake Bygdin (1060 m above sea level - different elevations can be found since the lake is dammed), was opened. The boat, which is aptly named Bitihorn, still traffics the route from Bygdin Hotel to Eidsbugarden hotel in the western end for about ten weeks each summer. This was in the beginning of the 20th century a remarkable feat since there were no roads leading to the lake, but the boat was dragged there.

During World War II, the steep east side was used by the German alpine troops for training. It is still possible to see at least one of the campsites used by them on the west side of the road. Earlier, until the 70s, paths of their mules could still be seen in the huge talus slope on the east side. The path is still there, but it is now made by sheep. Ruins of the mule stables, dug out in the soft soil on the east side of the road, are still visible. On the southern shoulder it is possible to find small one-man-shelters with holes for the guns. Some of these are probably built later as replicas, but some of them derive from 1941 to 1942.

== Climbing ==
Bitihorn has become somewhat a symbolic sentry tower for Øystre Slidre Municipality. It can be seen from most of the valley and the mountain plains on both sides. At the tourist resort, Beitostølen, which is only a short distance to the southeast, it is used as the symbol of the tourist industry. The peak is climbed by an enormous number of tourists and locals during the summer season, mostly. It is easy to ascend from the north, even in the winter it is accessible.

It can also be climbed from the south, but good route knowledge is required in order to avoid technical climbing. From the northeast the route is well marked.

On the summit there is a huge antenna and a small cabin, which is closed to the public. To the south and east very little blocks the view to the rest of Valdres. To the north the Rasletinden, Kalvehøgde, Torfinnstindene and Galdebergtinden mountains dominate the view, and to the west you can see the forbidding spire of Falketind.

== Name ==
The first element is derived from the verb bite which means 'bite' and the last element is horn which means 'horn" or "sharp-pointed mountain", thus 'the bitten horn'.

== See also ==
- List of mountains of Norway
