= Styggehøe (disambiguation) =

Styggehøe, Stygghøin, or Styggehøi is the name of several mountains in Norway:

- Store Styggehøe, a 2,213-metre (7,260 ft) mountain in Lom municipality in Innlandet county, Norway
- Styggehøi, a 1,885-metre (6,184 ft) mountain on the border of Vågå and Lom municipalities in Innlandet county, Norway
- Styggehøe, a 1,825-metre (5,988 ft) mountain on the border of Vågå and Nord-Fron municipalities in Innlandet county, Norway
- Styggehøi (Skjåk), a 1,405-metre (4,610 ft) mountain in Skjåk municipality in Innlandet county, Norway
- Stygghøin, a 1,858-metre (6,096 ft) mountain in Dovre municipality in Innlandet county, Norway
