= Gråhøe (Øystre Slidre) =

Mountain in Innlandet, Norway

- Interactive map of the mountain

Highest point
- Elevation: 1,779 m (5,837 ft)
- Prominence: 439 m (1,440 ft)
- Isolation: 8.3 km (5.2 mi) to Heimdalshøe
- Coordinates: 61°23′02″N 8°59′24″E

Geography
- Location: Innlandet, Norway

Gråhøe is a mountain in Øystre Slidre Municipality in Innlandet county, Norway. The 1,779-metre (5,837 ft) tall mountain is located about 16 kilometres (9.9 mi) northeast of the village of Beitostølen. The mountain is surrounded by several other notable mountains including Heimdalshøe to the northwest, Skaget to the southeast, Kvernhøe to the southwest, and Raslet to the west. The lake Vinstre lies to the south. The mountain sits on the eastern edge of the Valdresflye plateau.

== See also ==
- List of mountains of Norway by height
