= Sikkilsdalshøa =

Mountain in Innlandet, Norway

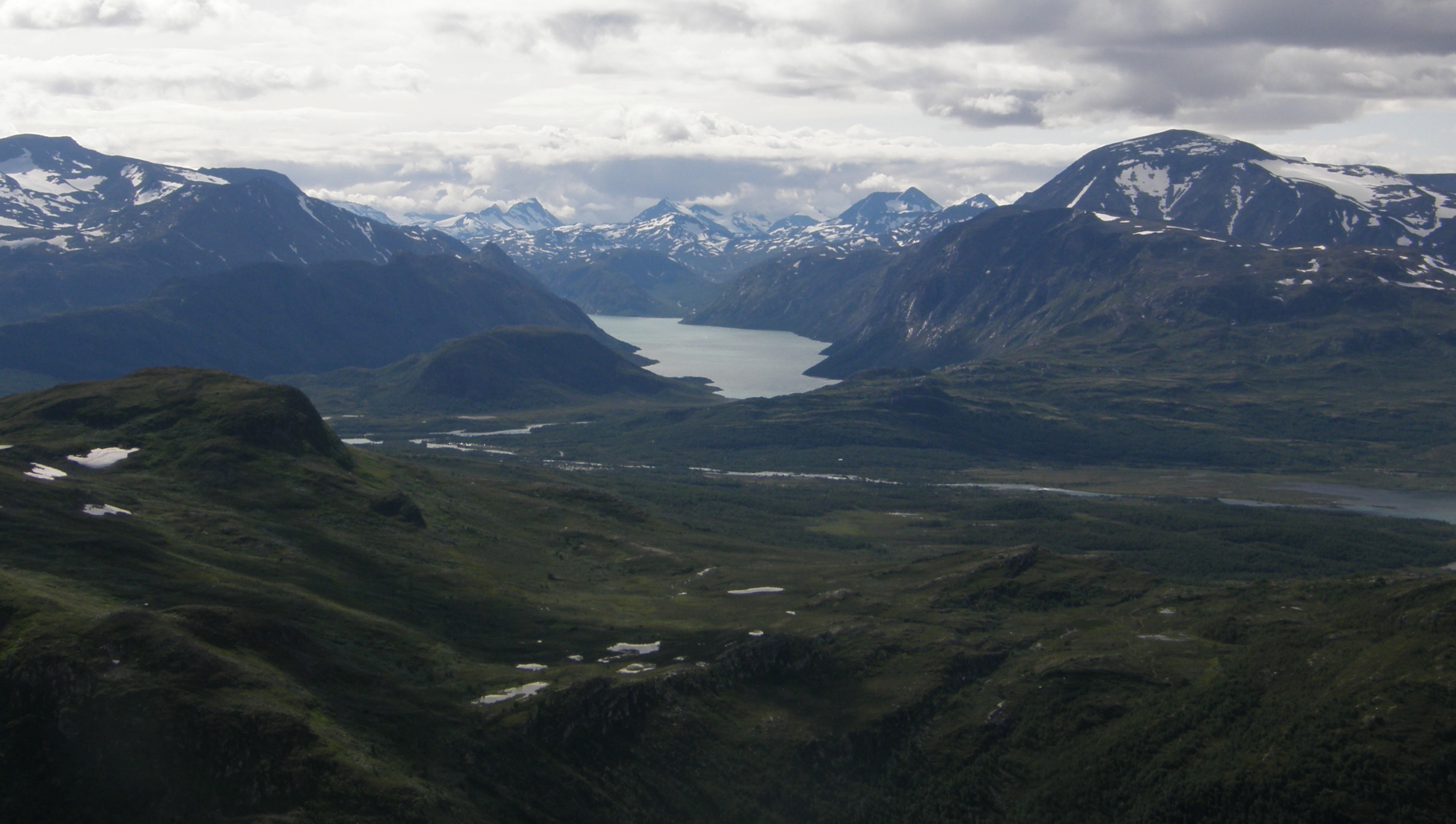
- View from Sikkilsdalshøa. Gjende in the middle, with Besseggen and Besshøe to their right.

Highest point
- Elevation: 1,778 m (5,833 ft)
- Prominence: 648 m (2,126 ft)
- Isolation: 4 km (2.5 mi)
- Coordinates: 61°30′10″N 8°57′48″E

Geography
- Interactive map of the mountain
- Location: Innlandet, Norway
- Parent range: Jotunheimen

Sikkilsdalshøa is a mountain in Nord-Fron Municipality in Innlandet county, Norway. The 1,778-metre (5,833 ft) tall mountain is located in the Jotunheimen mountains about 45 kilometres (28 mi) south of the village of Vågåmo. The mountain is surrounded by several other notable mountains including Heimdalshøe and Styggehøe to the southwest and Gravdalsknappen and Ingulssjøhøi to the northeast.

== See also ==
- List of mountains of Norway by height
