= Royal Mountain Chalet, Prinsehytta =

Cottage in Sikkilsdalen in Jotunheimen, Norway

Coordinates: 61°29′11″N 9°01′44″E

The Royal Mountain Chalet Prinsehytta
- Interactive map of the The Royal Mountain Chalet; Prinsehytta area

General information
- Type: Chalet; Mountain Residence for the Norwegian Royal Family
- Location: Sikkilsdalen; Jotunheimen, Norway
- Completed: 1900
- Opened: 1902

Technical details
- Structural system: Timber Log cabin

Design and construction
- Architect: Hjalmar Welhaven

The Royal Mountain Chalet (Norwegian: Prinsehytta, The Prince Cottage) is a cottage in Sikkilsdalen in Jotunheimen, Norway. The cottage is privately owned by the Norwegian Royal Family, where they usually spend winter and Easter holidays. The cottage was built in 1900 and was completed in 1902 when it was given as a gift to the Swedish princes Gustaf Adolf, Wilhelm and Erik. Until the dissolution of the Swedish-Norwegian union it was used extensively for hunting and outdoor activities. It was given to Crown Prince Olav when he came of age July 2, 1924, by then Swedish Crown Prince Gustaf Adolf.

The cottage was designed by the castellan Hjalmar Welhaven. Originally the Prince's cabin consisted of a big log house with eight rooms and a gallery. After it was donated to Crown Prince Olav several houses were added and the current royal couple has had even more cottages built.

The original cabin and most of the other lodges that have been constructed are built of timber, and some with natural cladding. The walls are treated with tar. Windows are small-paned, in traditional white painted frames. The roofs are covered with either sod or slate.

The Royal Mountain Chalet consists of buildings with various functions, grouped around two yards, whose plan, design and construction represent Norwegian building ideals.
