= Valdresflye =

Mountain plateau in southeastern Norway

- Valdresflya (historic); Valdresflyi (unofficial)
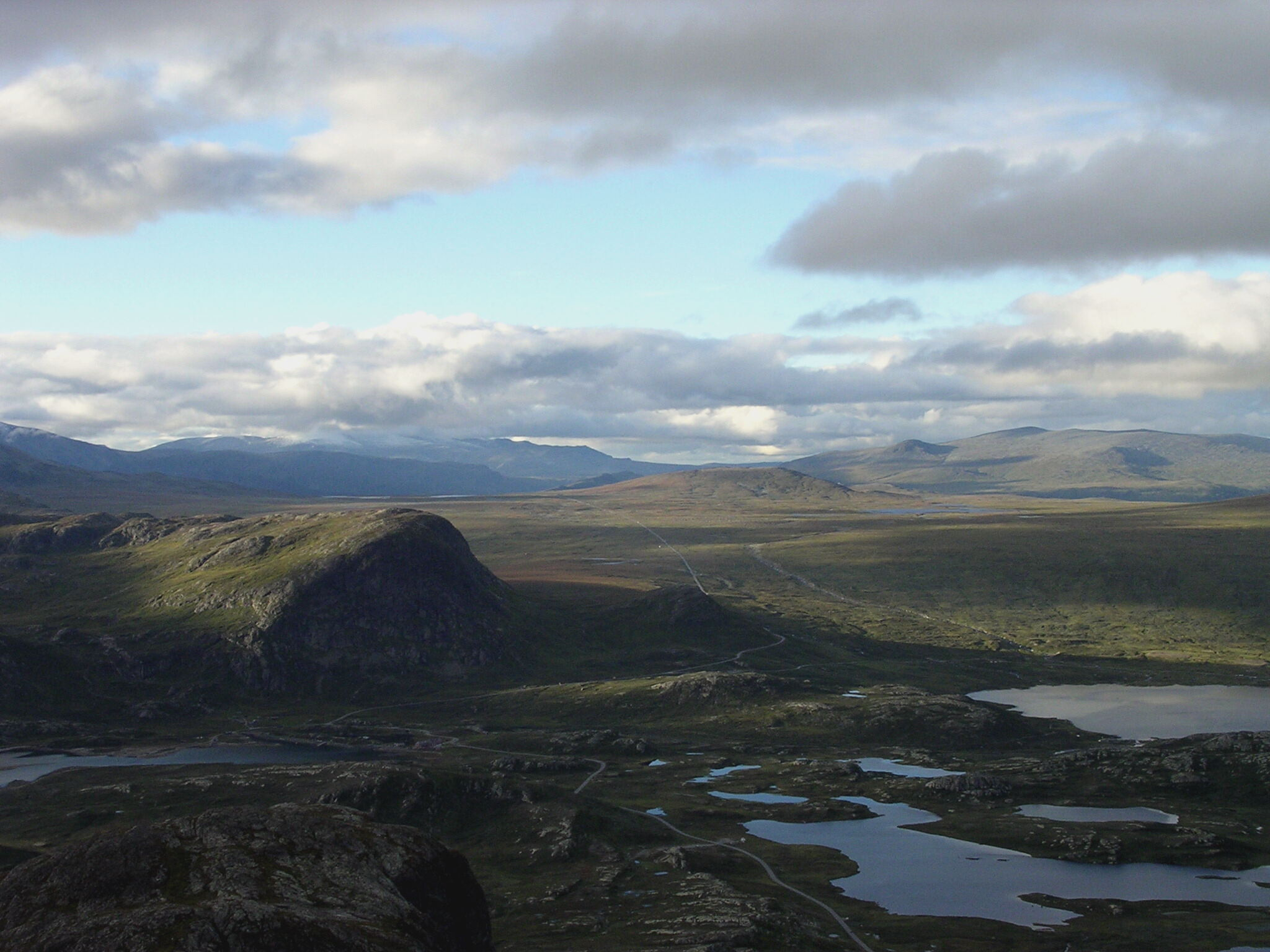
- Valdresflye as seen from Bitihorn

Highest point
- Peak: Fisketjernnuten
- Coordinates: 61.3912°N 8.8112°E

Geography
- Interactive map of the mountain
- Location: Innlandet, Norway
- Range coordinates: 61.38603°N 8.81646°E

Valdresflye is a mountain plateau in the easternmost part of the Jotunheimen mountains in Norway. The plateau lies in Innlandet county, mostly in Øystre Slidre Municipality, with a small area in Vang Municipality. Norwegian County Road 51 runs over the plateau, reaching 1,389 meters (4,557 ft) above mean sea level; the road is only open in summer.

The plateau is surrounded by several mountains including Gråhøe to the east, Heimdalshøe to the northeast, Tjønnholstinden to the northwest, and Rasletinden to the west. Lakes Bygdin and Vinstre lie along the south side of the plateau.

== Name ==
The plateaus is named Valdresflye. The first part of the name is that of the Valdres district in which it is located; the suffix flye is the finite form of the Norwegian word fly, meaning "flat mountain plateau".

== Media gallery ==
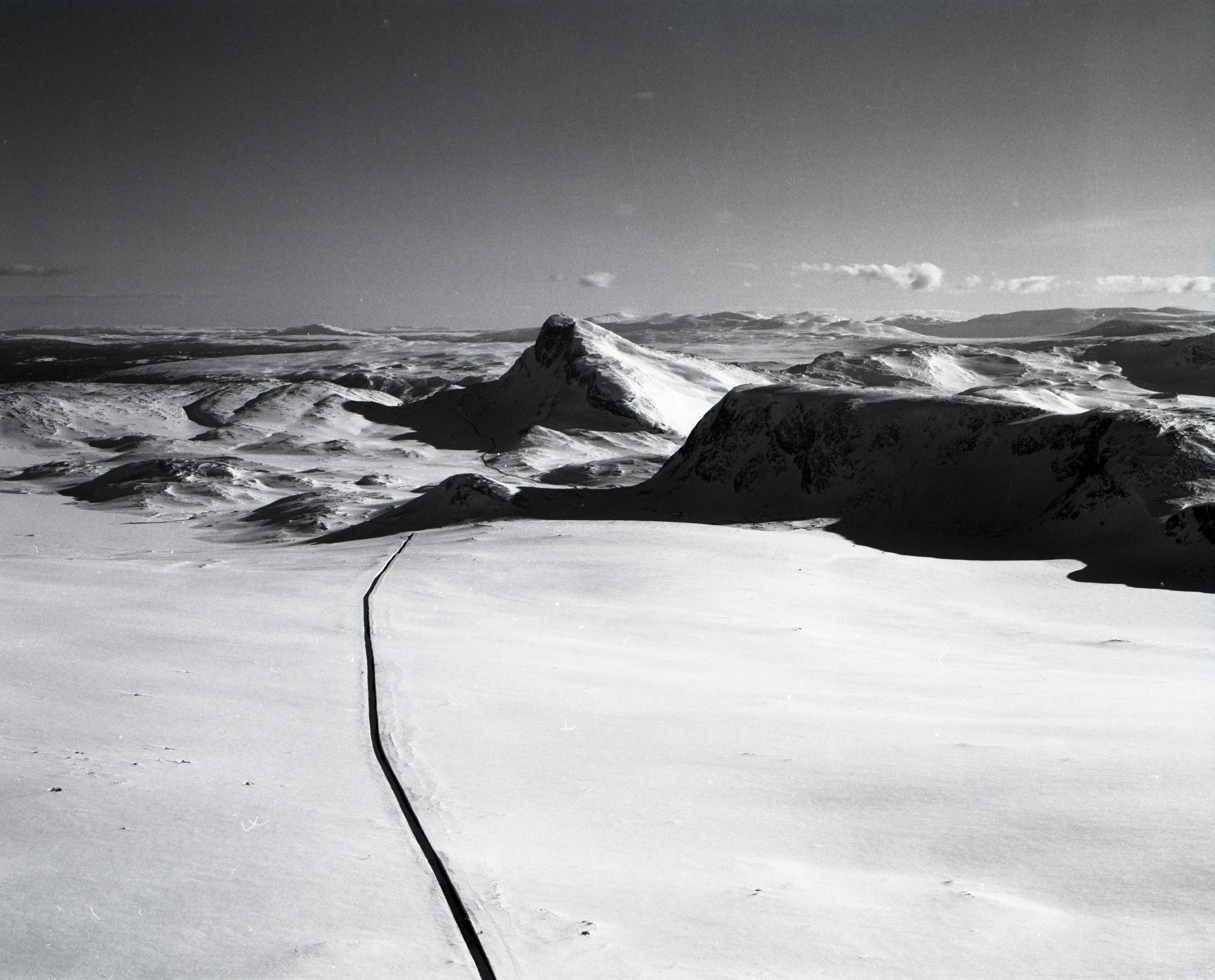
Seen from the north in the direction of Bygdin

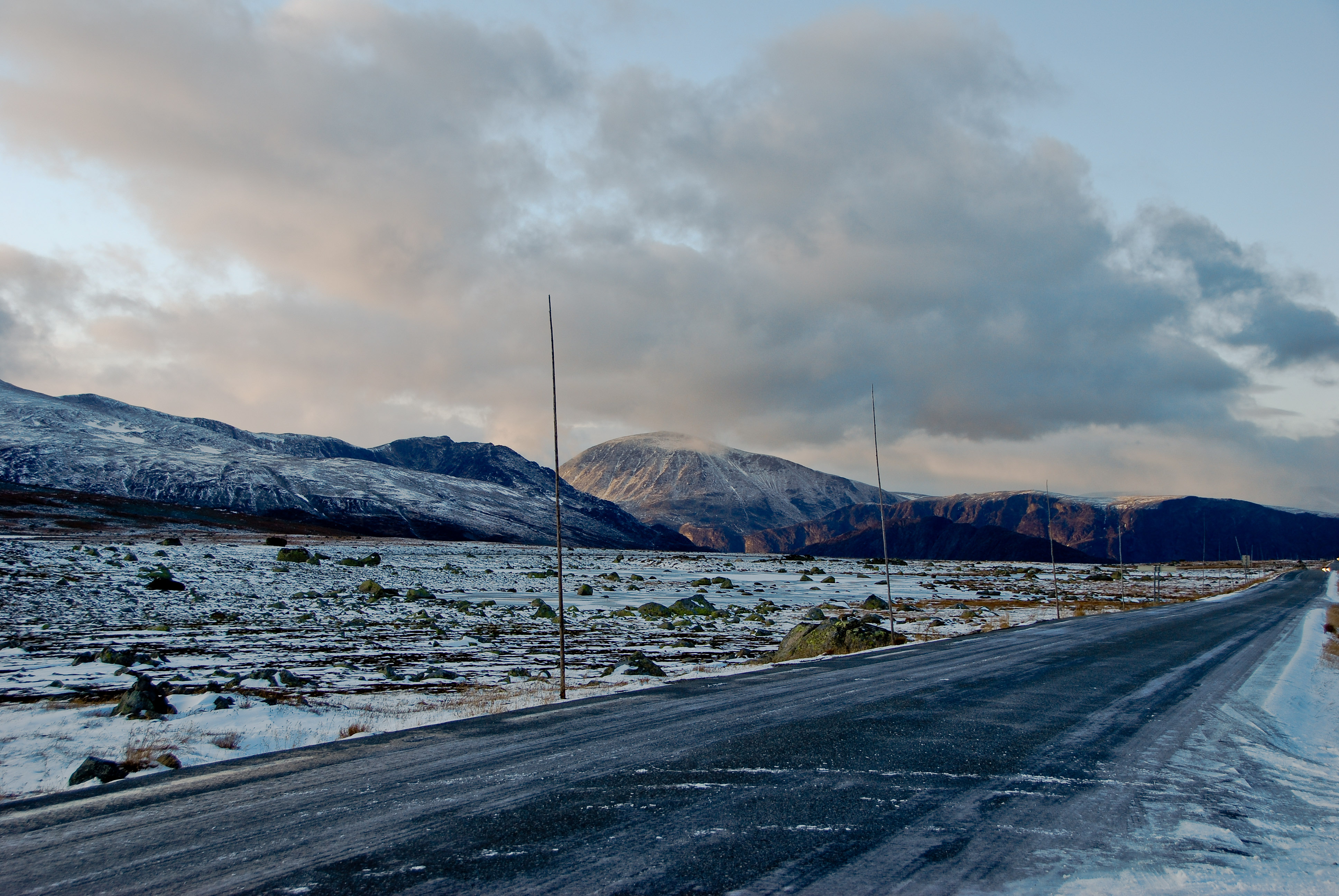
The plateau in October

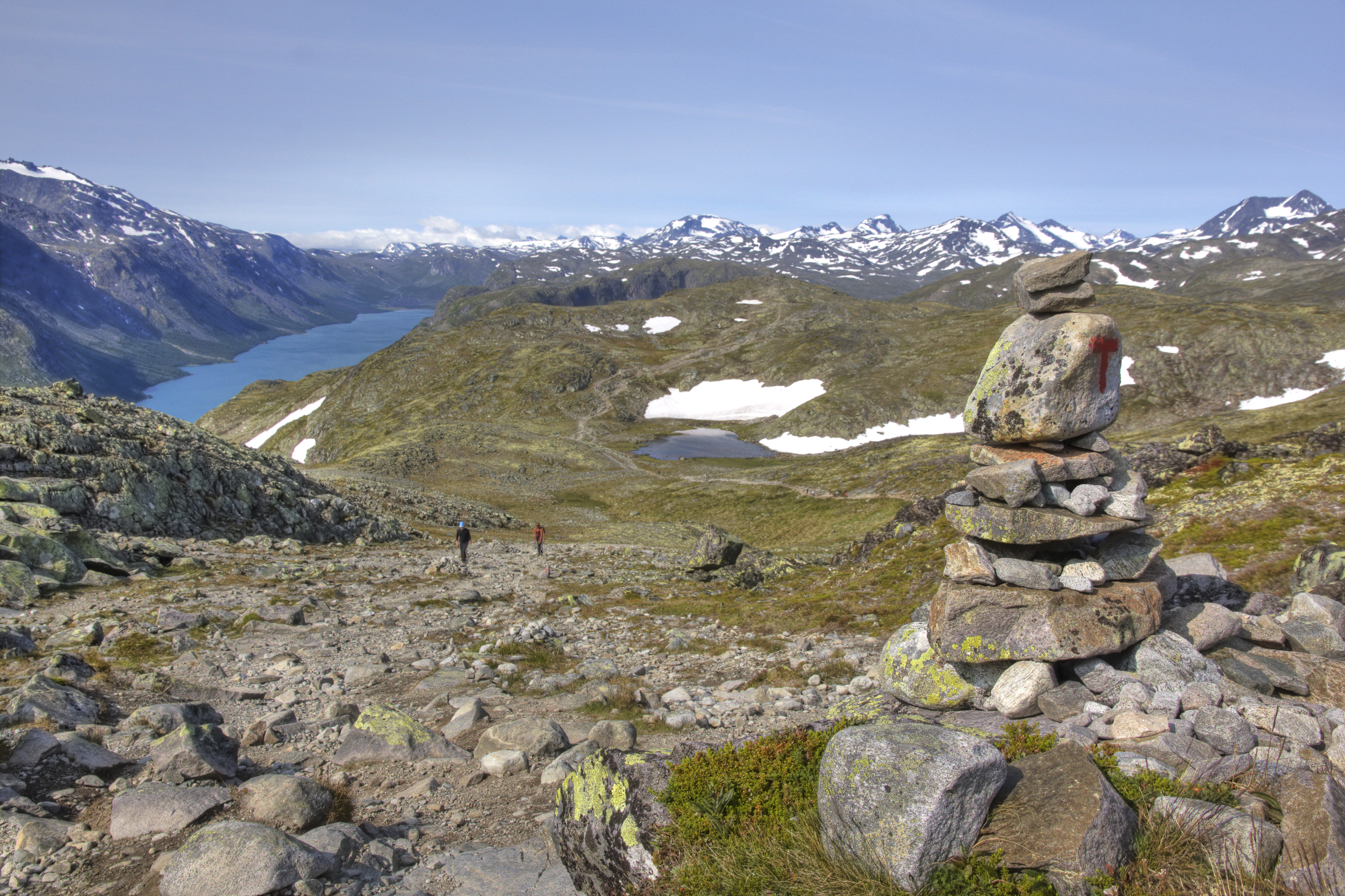
View of Bandet

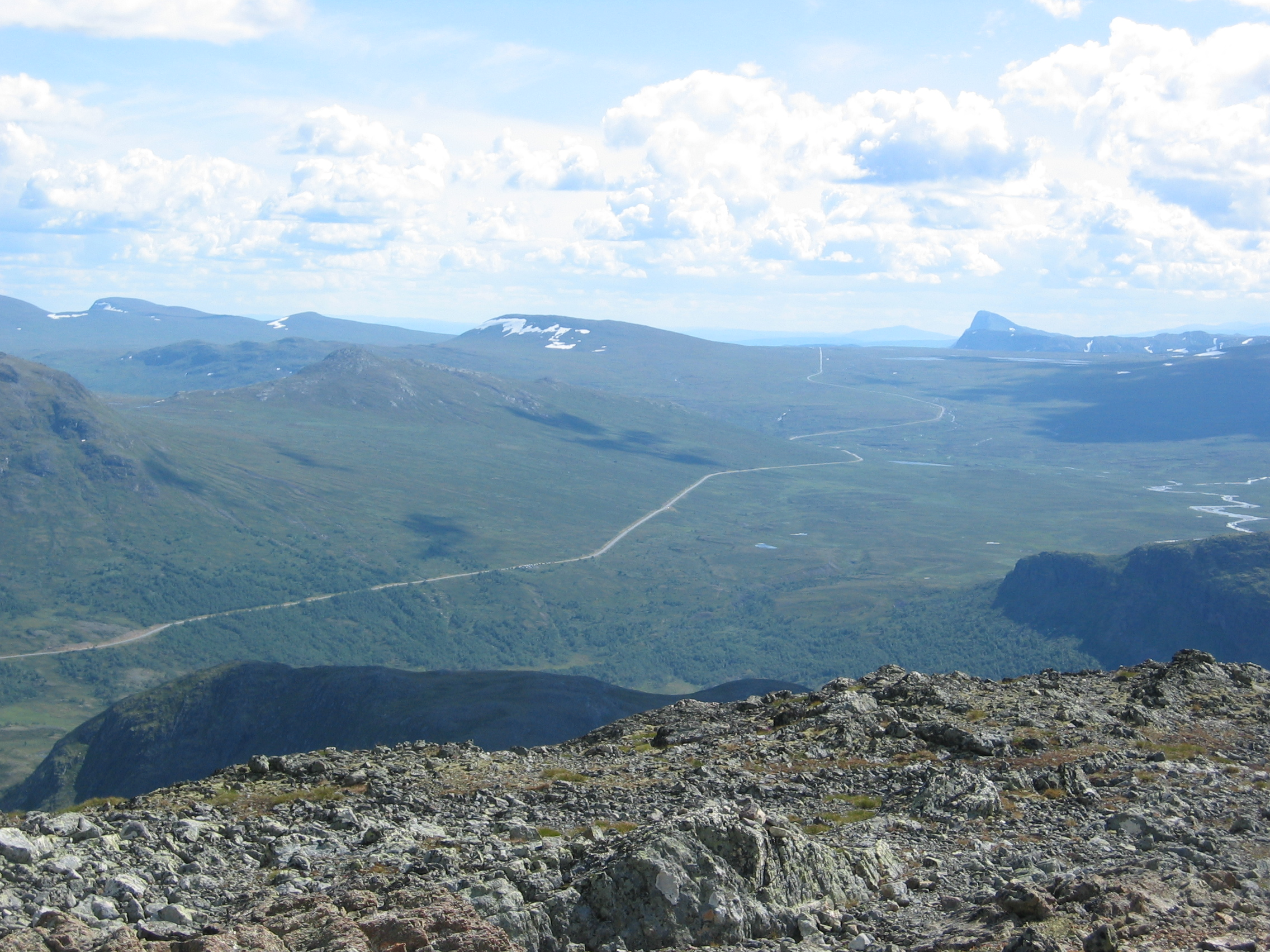
Road over Valdresflya

== See also ==
- List of mountains of Norway
