= Norwegian County Road 51 =

Road in Norway

County Road 51
- Bokmål: Fylkesvei 51; Nynorsk: Fylkesveg 51
- Map of the road

Route information
- Length: 168.2 km (104.5 mi)

Location
- Country: Norway

Highway system
- Roads in Norway; National Roads; County Roads

County Road 51 (Norwegian: Fylkesvei 51) is a 168.2-kilometer-long (104.5 mi) highway which runs north–south between Vågå Municipality and Gol Municipality in Norway. It is a Norwegian county road. Part of the road runs concurrently with E16, between Leira and Fagernes. The 37-kilometer (23 mi) section across Valdresflye is designated a National Tourist Route. This section is closed in the winter. Prior to 2010, the road was a Norwegian national road and it was known as National Road 51 (Norwegian: Riksvei 51).

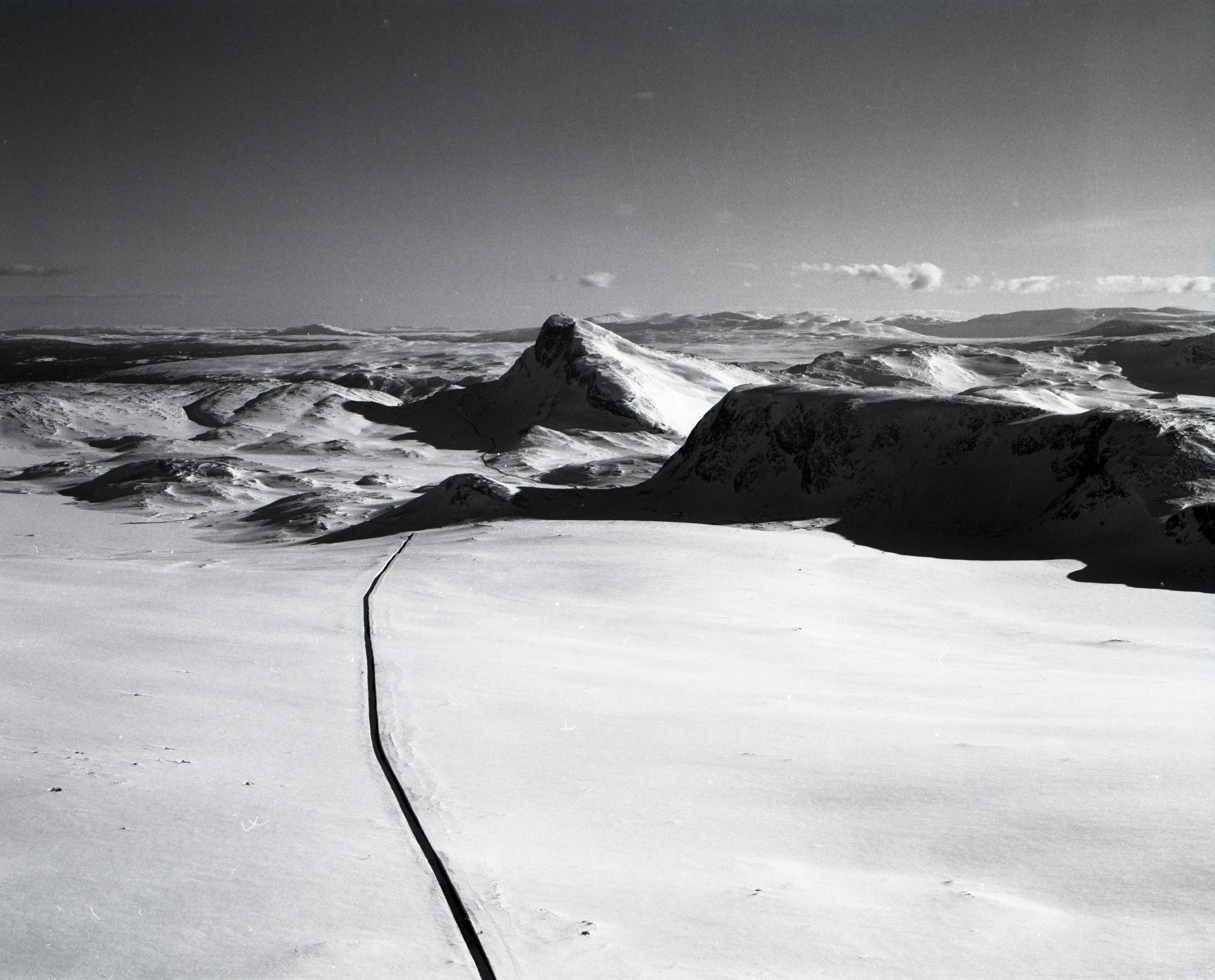
Country road 51 running across Valdresflye

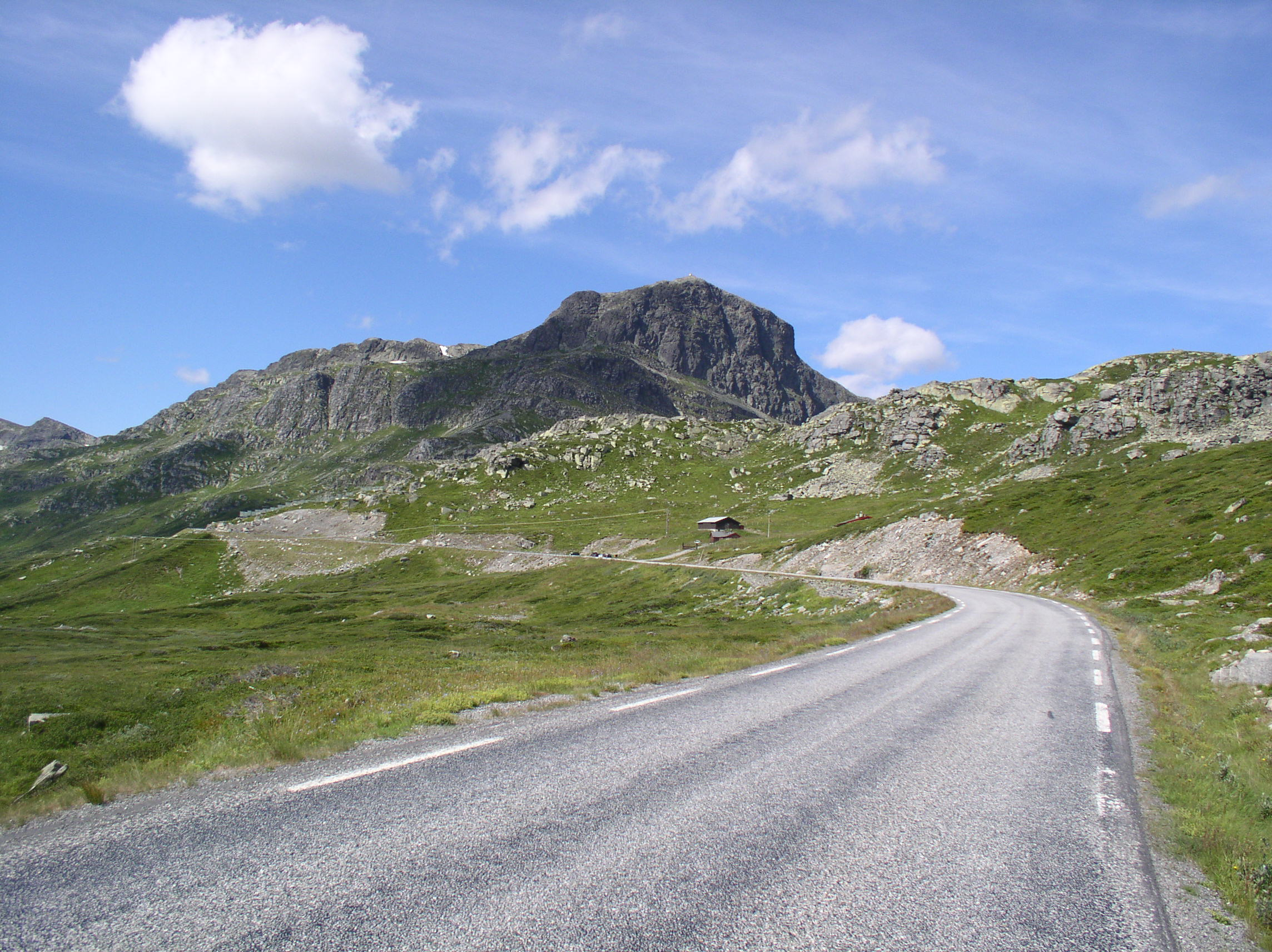
The road with Bitihorn in the background
