= Skaget =

Mountain in Innlandet, Norway

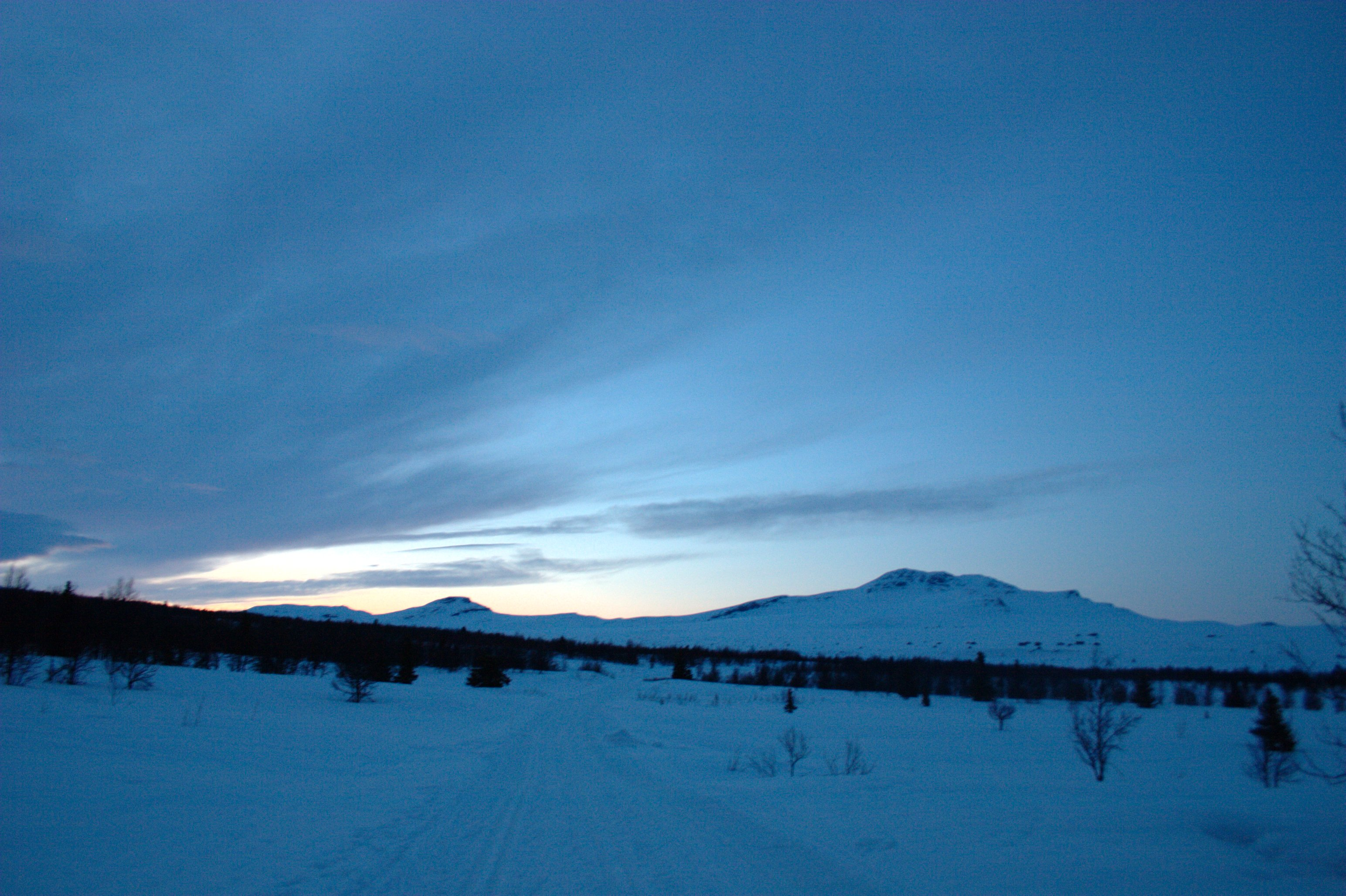

Highest point
- Elevation: 1,686 m (5,531 ft)
- Prominence: 621 m (2,037 ft)
- Isolation: 14.7 km (9.1 mi) to Gråhøe
- Coordinates: 61°17′28″N 9°12′00″E

Geography
- Interactive map of the mountain
- Location: Innlandet, Norway

Skaget is a mountain in Øystre Slidre Municipality in Innlandet county, Norway. The 1,686-metre-tall (5,531 ft) mountain is located in the Langsua National Park, about 17 kilometres (11 mi) east of the village of Beitostølen.

== See also ==
- List of mountains of Norway by height
