= Styggehøe =

Mountain in Vågå and Nord-Fron, Norway

- Styggehøi (unofficial)
- Interactive map of the mountain

Highest point
- Elevation: 1,825 m (5,988 ft)
- Prominence: 74 m (243 ft)
- Parent peak: Heimdalshøe
- Isolation: 1.4 km (0.87 mi)
- Coordinates: 61°27′59″N 8°55′14″E

Geography
- Location: Innlandet, Norway
- Parent range: Jotunheimen

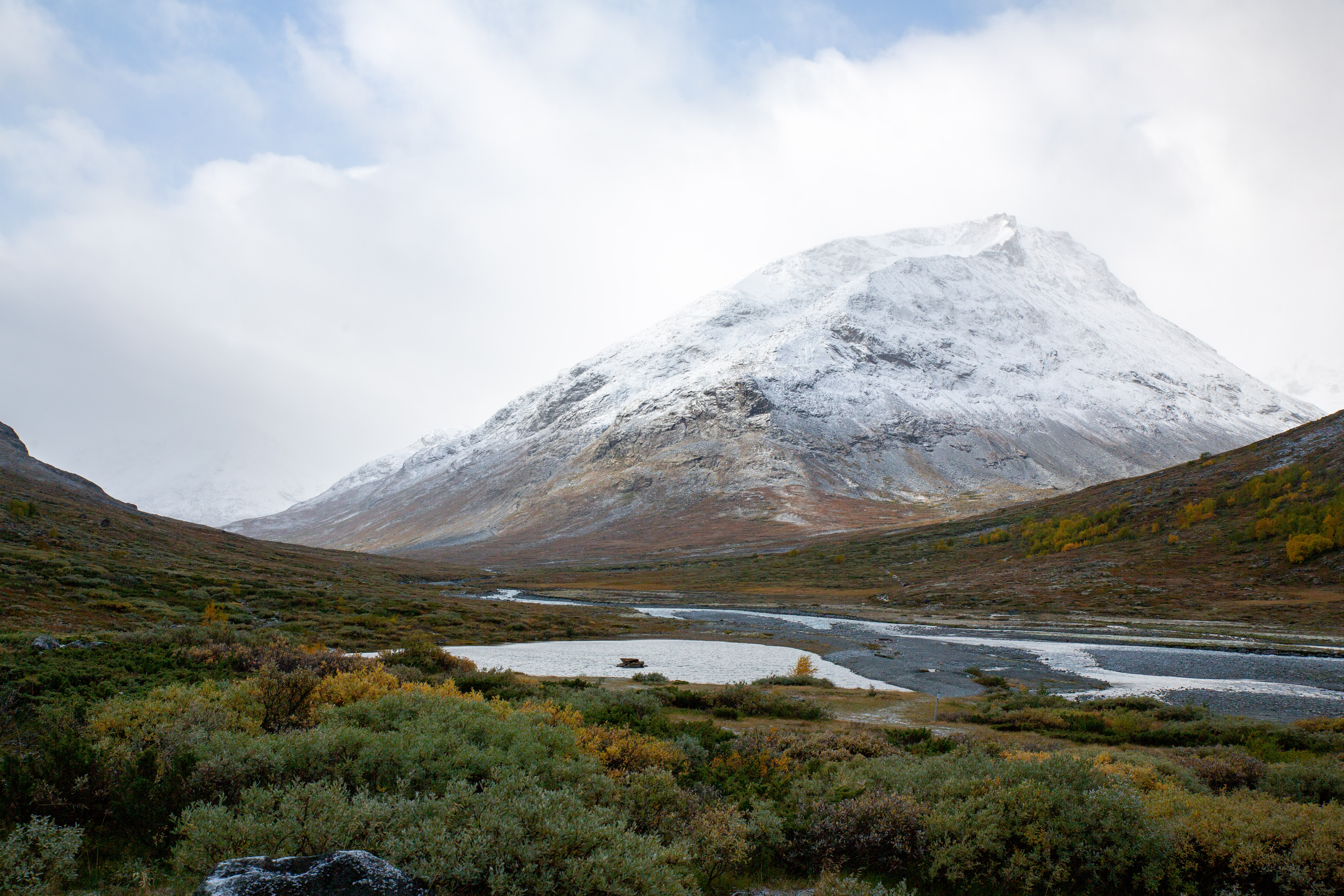
Stygghøe mountain in Jotunheimen in autumn, as seen from Spiterstulen

Styggehøe is a mountain on the border of Vågå Municipality and Nord-Fron Municipality in Innlandet county, Norway. The 1,825-metre (5,988 ft) tall mountain is located in the Jotunheimen mountains. The mountain sits about 23 kilometres (14 mi) north of the village of Beitostølen. The mountain is surrounded by several other notable mountains including Heimdalshøe to the southwest.

== See also ==
- List of mountains of Norway by height
