= Heimdalshøe =

Mountain in Innlandet, Norway

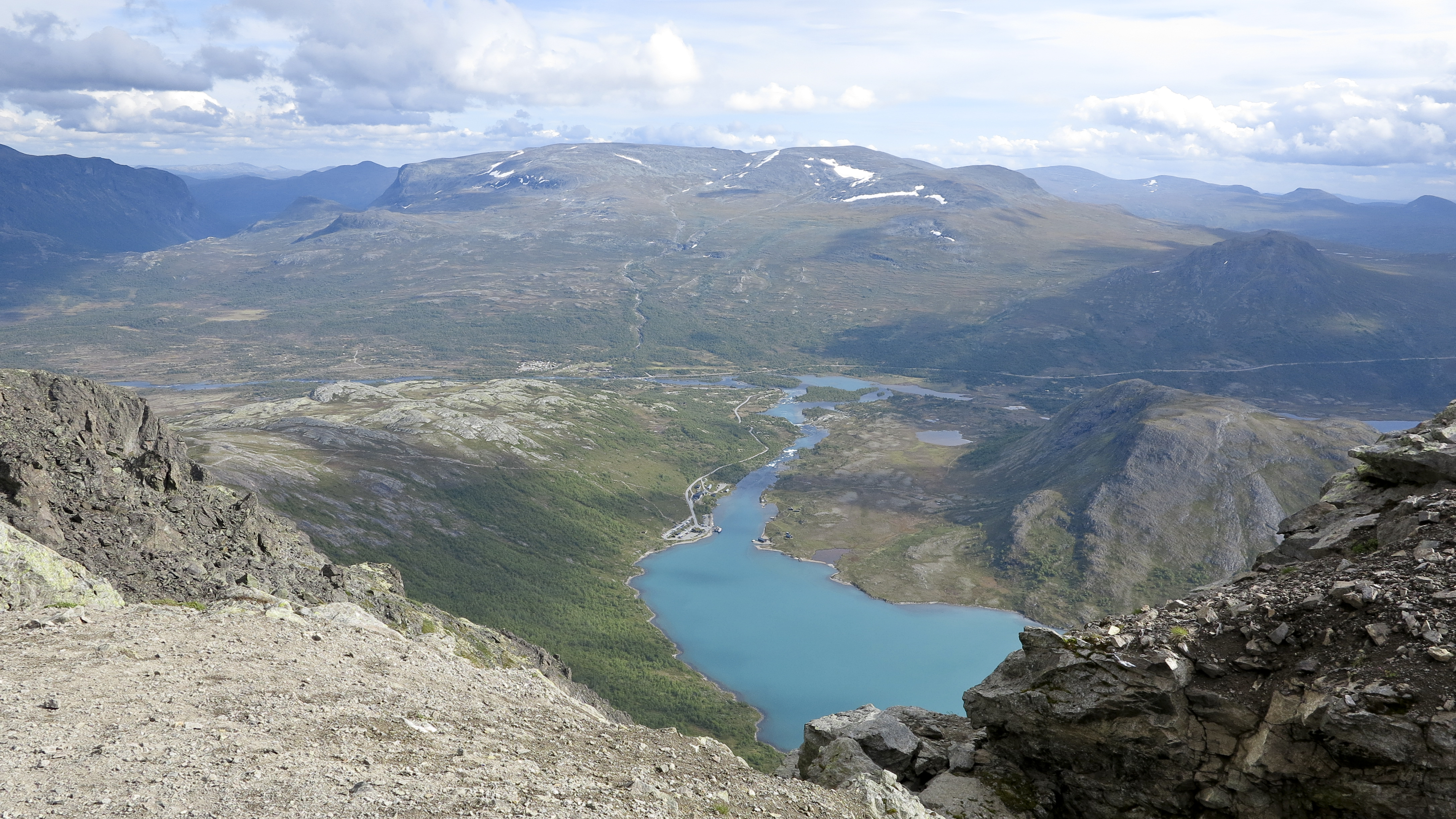
- Heimdalshøe seen from Besseggen; Credit: Xauxa (Håkan Svensson), 2012

Highest point
- Elevation: 1,843 m (6,047 ft)
- Prominence: 678 m (2,224 ft)
- Isolation: 10.1 km (6.3 mi) to Bukkehåmåren
- Coordinates: 61°27′16″N 8°54′08″E

Geography
- Interactive map of the mountain
- Location: Innlandet, Norway
- Parent range: Jotunheimen

Heimdalshøe is a mountain on the border of Nord-Fron Municipality and Vågå Municipality in Innlandet county, Norway. The 1,843-metre (6,047 ft) tall mountain is located in the Jotunheimen mountains and in the upper Sikkilsdalen valley. The mountain sits about 47 kilometres (29 mi) south of the village of Vågåmo and about 24 kilometres (15 mi) north of the village of Beitostølen. The mountain is surrounded by several other notable mountains including Styggehøe, Gravdalsknappen, and Ingulssjøhøi to the northeast; and Besshø and Besseggen to the northwest. At a height of 1,843 metres (6,047 ft) above sea level, it is the highest mountain in the Nord-Fron Municipality. The mountain's topographic prominence of 670 metres (2,200 ft) is among Scandinavia's 200 highest.

== See also ==
- List of mountains of Norway by height
