= Oyer =

Oyer or Øyer may refer to:

== People ==
- Harvey Eugene Oyer Jr. (1926–2010), American businessman and civic leader
- Harvey Eugene Oyer III (born 1968), American author and attorney from West Palm Beach, Florida
- John S. Oyer (1925–1998), American anabaptist scholar and editor
- Paul Oyer (born 1963), American labor economist

== Places ==
- Øyer Municipality, a municipality in Innlandet county, Norway
- Øyer (village), a village within Øyer Municipality in Innlandet county, Norway
- Øyer Church, a church in Øyer Municipality in Innlandet county, Norway
- Oyer, Missouri, an unincorporated community in St. Clair County, in the U.S. state of Missouri

== Other ==
- Oyer and terminer, a legal term
- Øyer-Tretten IF, a sports club based in Øyer Municipality in Innlandet county, Norway

== See also ==
- Oyez, the interjection used to call a courtroom to order
