= Anders Lysgaard =

Norwegian politician

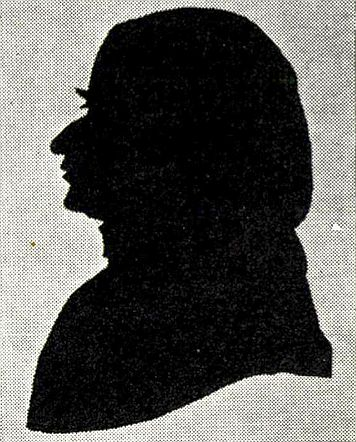
- Born: 15 August 1756; Tretten, Norway
- Died: 24 May 1827 (aged 70)
- Occupations: farmer and sheriff
- Known for: representative at the Norwegian Constituent Assembly

Anders Lysgaard (15 August 1756 – 24 May 1827) was a Norwegian farmer and sheriff. He was a representative at the Norwegian Constituent Assembly at Eidsvoll Manor.

Anders Eriksen Lysgaard was born in the village of Tretten (in the present-day Øyer Municipality) in Oppland county, Norway. He was the youngest of seven children born into a farming family in the traditional region of Gudbrandsdal. His family lived on the farm Jevne in Øyer. Anders Lysgaard was appointed sheriff under the magistrate of Ringsaker in Hedmark from 1782 to 1786. Anders Lysgaard was married in 1786 with Ingeborg Larsdatter Svennes (1771-1858) and took over Svennes, a sizable farm near the village of Biri.

He represented Christians amt (now Oppland) at the Norwegian Constituent Assembly at Eidsvoll Manor in 1814 where he favored the independence party (Selvstendighetspartiet). He was later a member of the Parliament of Norway.
