= Granrudmoen =

Village in Øyer Municipality, Norway

- Village
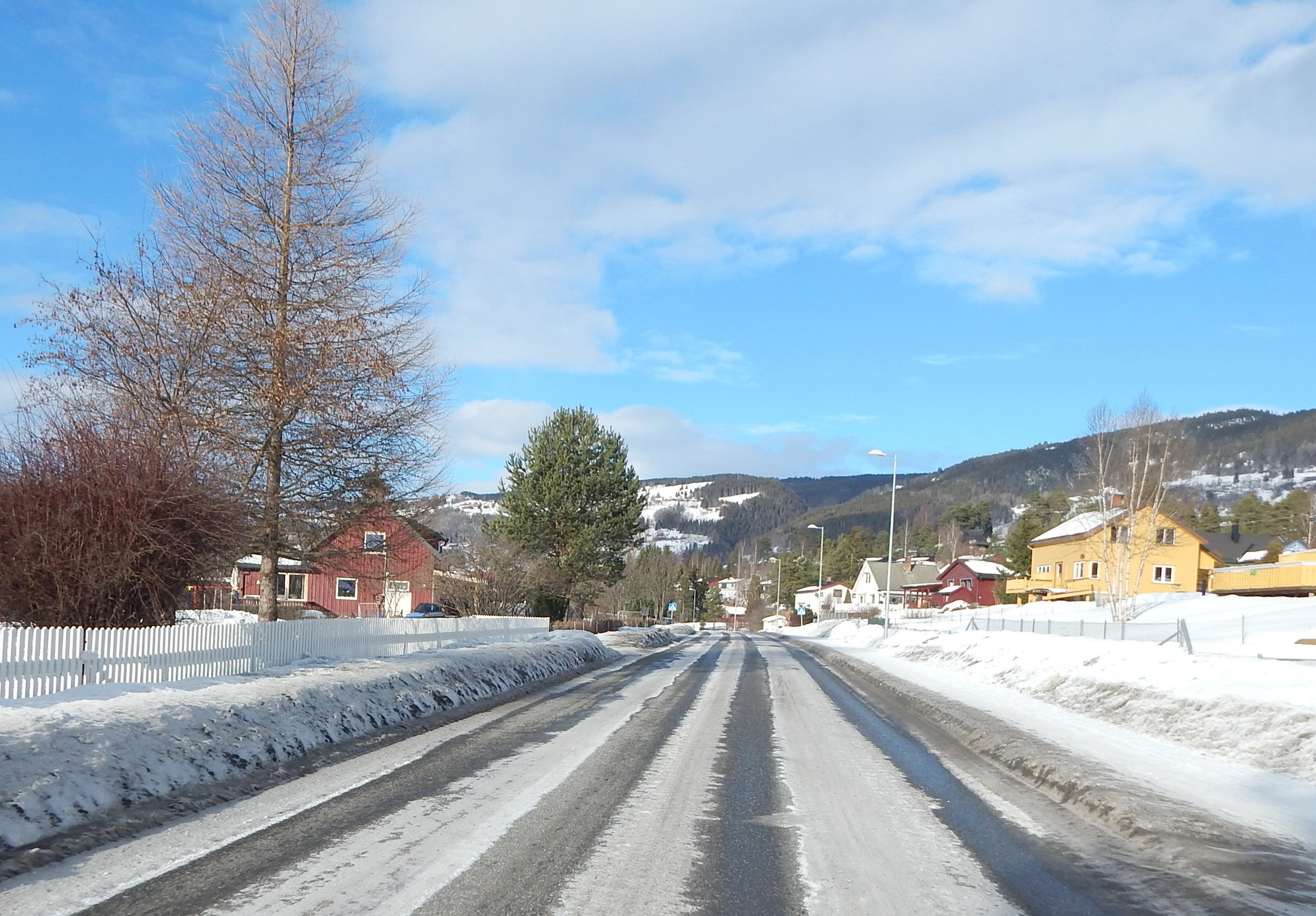
- View of the village
- Interactive map of Granrudmoen
- Location within Innlandet Location within Norway
- Coordinates: 61.24703°N 10.44271°E
- Country: Norway
- Region: Eastern Norway
- County: Innlandet
- District: Gudbrandsdalen
- Municipality: Øyer Municipality

Area
  - Total: 2.01 km^{2} (0.78 sq mi)
- Elevation: 205 m (673 ft)

Population (2024)
  - Total: 1,719
  - Density: 855/km^{2} (2,210/sq mi)
- Time zone: UTC+01:00 (CET)
  - Summer (DST): UTC+02:00 (CEST)
- Post Code: 2636 Øyer

Granrudmoen is the largest village in Øyer Municipality in Innlandet county, Norway. The village is located in the Gudbrandsdal valley, along the Gudbrandsdalslågen river in the southern part of the municipality. It is the commercial centre of the municipality. It is located along the European route E6 highway, about 15 kilometres (9.3 mi) north of the town of Lillehammer. The municipal centre of Tingberg is located about 5 kilometres (3.1 mi) to the north.

The 2.01-square-kilometre (500-acre) village has a population (2024) of 1,719 and a population density of 855 inhabitants per square kilometre (2,210/sq mi).

Granrudmoen is located close to the 1994 Winter Olympic venues of Hafjell and Hunderfossen. The local multi-sports team is Øyer-Tretten IF.

== Name ==
The village is named Granrudmoen. The first element is the name is taken from the small Granrud farm which means 'the clearing among the spruces'. The last element of the name is moen which means 'the moor' or 'the heath'.
