= Tingberg =

Village in Øyer Municipality, Norway

Tingberg Øyer
- Village
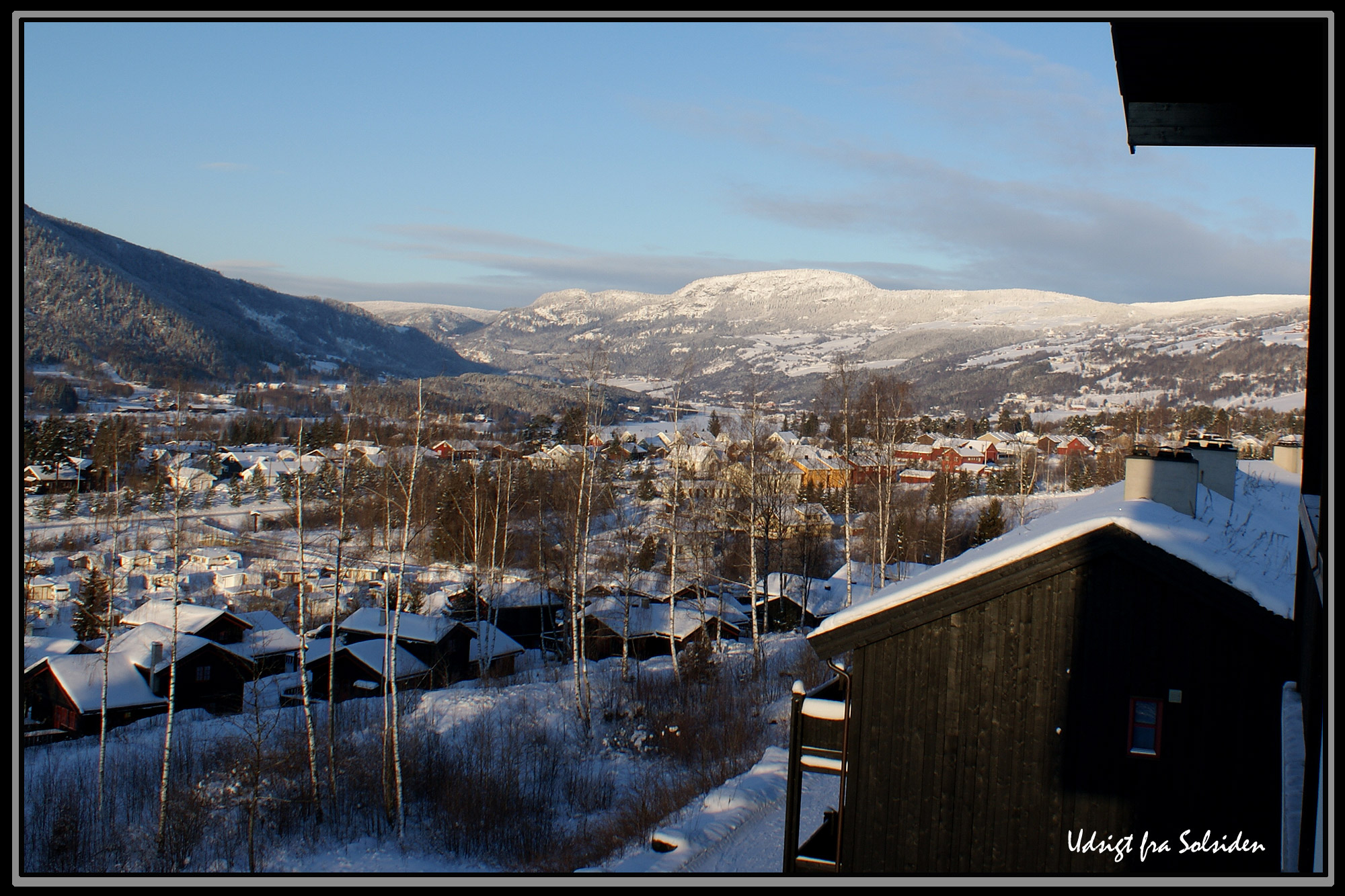
- View of the village
- Interactive map of Tingberg; Øyer
- Location within Innlandet Location within Norway
- Coordinates: 61.26309°N 10.41641°E
- Country: Norway
- Region: Eastern Norway
- County: Innlandet
- District: Gudbrandsdalen
- Municipality: Øyer Municipality

Area
  - Total: 0.75 km^{2} (0.29 sq mi)
- Elevation: 177 m (581 ft)

Population (2024)
  - Total: 498
  - Density: 664/km^{2} (1,720/sq mi)
- Time zone: UTC+01:00 (CET)
  - Summer (DST): UTC+02:00 (CEST)
- Post Code: 2636 Øyer

Tingberg or Øyer is the administrative centre of Øyer Municipality in Innlandet county, Norway. The village is located in the Gudbrandsdal valley, along the Gudbrandsdalslågen river in the southern part of the municipality. It is located along the European route E6 highway, about 20 kilometres (12 mi) north of the town of Lillehammer. The village of Tretten lies about 5 kilometres (3.1 mi) to the northwest and the village of Granrudmoen lies about 5 kilometres (3.1 mi) to the south.

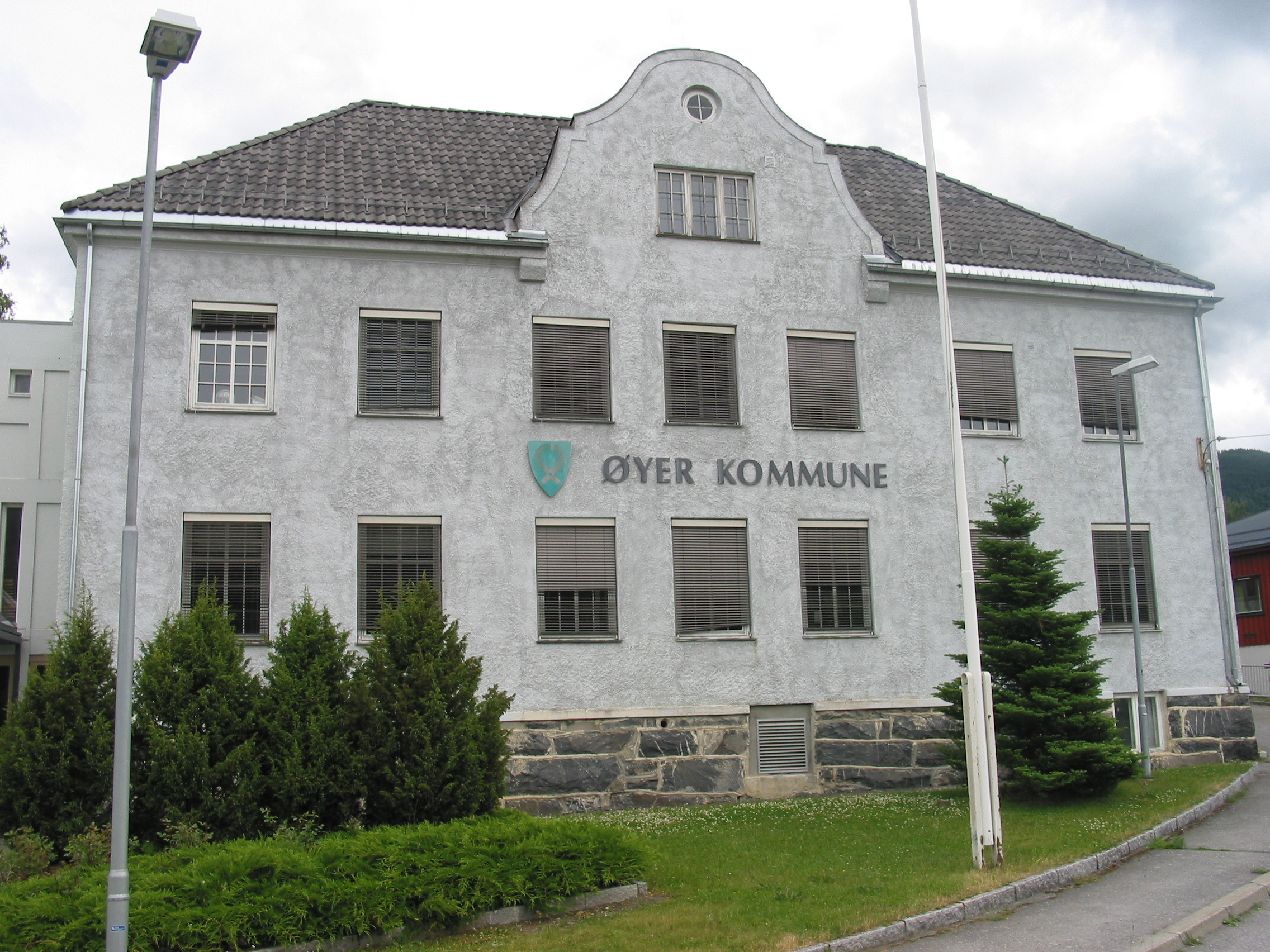
Øyer municipal building

The 0.75-square-kilometre (190-acre) village has a population (2024) of 498 and a population density of 664 inhabitants per square kilometre (1,720/sq mi).

The village is the site of Øyer Church which serves the southern part of the municipality.
