= Øyer-Tretten IF =

Norwegian sports club

Home colours

Øyer-Tretten Idrettsforening is a multi-sports club from Øyer Municipality, Norway.

It was founded on 29 November 1990 as a merger between Øyer IL (founded on 23 November 1913 and based in Granrudmoen) and Tretten IL (founded on 31 May 1920 and based in Tretten). It has sections for alpine skiing, Nordic skiing, orienteering, gymnastics, association football, handball and floor hockey.

Olympic silver medalist Ole Stenen represented Øyer IL in his time, and skier Erling Jevne is the best known post-merger club member. Håvard Moheim, testracer and member of the Norwegian skiwaxing staff.

FA Premiership player Abdisalam Ibrahim has played for Øyer-Tretten, but moved to another part of Norway at age 11.
