= Tretten =

Village in Øyer Municipality, Norway

- Village
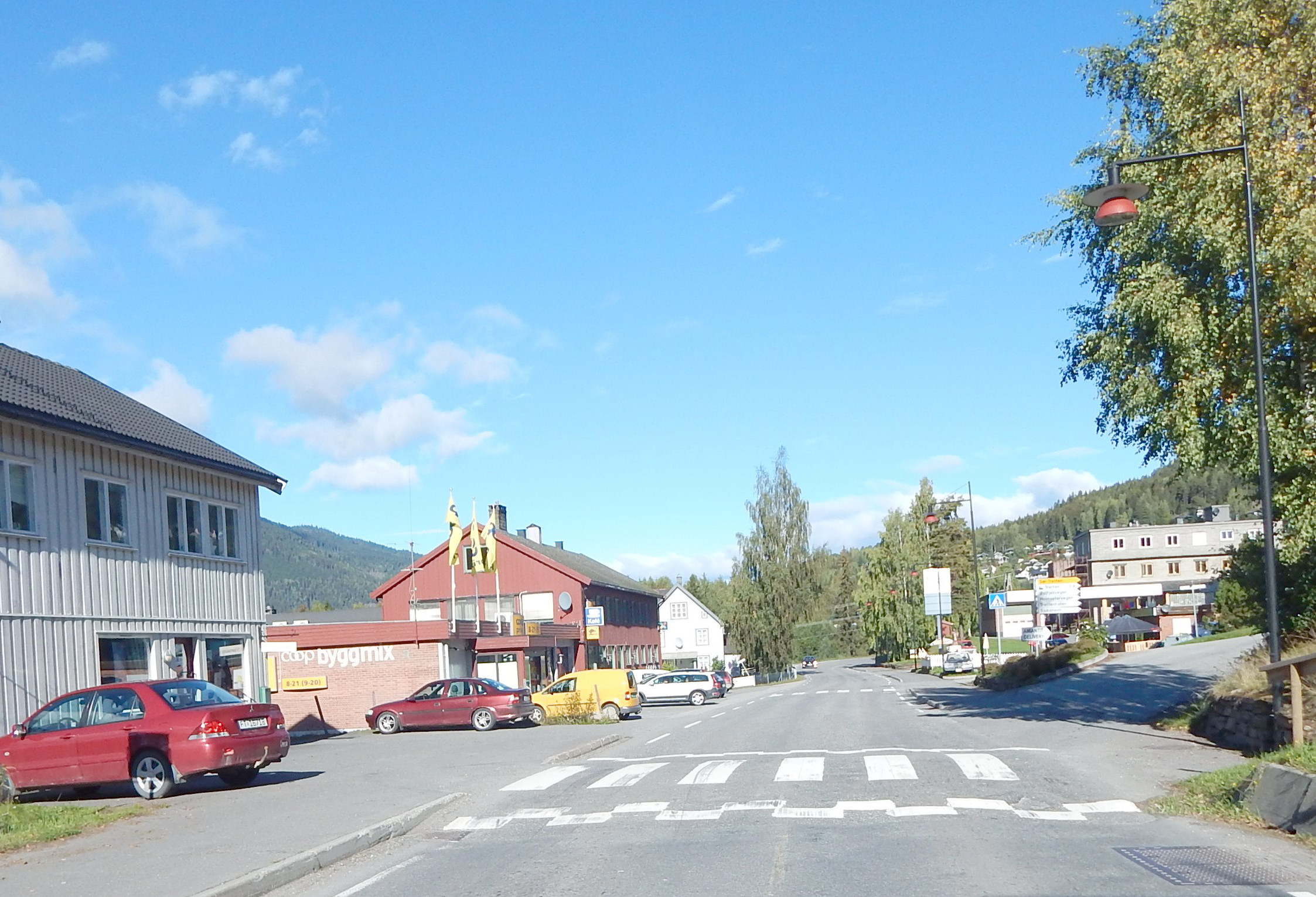
- View of the village
- Interactive map of Tretten
- Location within Innlandet Location within Norway
- Coordinates: 61.31438°N 10.30057°E
- Country: Norway
- Region: Eastern Norway
- County: Innlandet
- District: Gudbrandsdalen
- Municipality: Øyer Municipality

Area
  - Total: 1.22 km^{2} (0.47 sq mi)
- Elevation: 189 m (620 ft)

Population (2024)
  - Total: 861
  - Density: 706/km^{2} (1,830/sq mi)
- Time zone: UTC+01:00 (CET)
  - Summer (DST): UTC+02:00 (CEST)
- Post Code: 2635 Tretten

Tretten is a village in Øyer Municipality in Innlandet county, Norway. The village is located on the Losna lake, which is part of the Gudbrandsdalslågen river. Tretten is located in the Gudbrandsdal valley, along the Gudbrandsdalslågen river in the southern part of the municipality. It is located along the European route E6 highway, about 25 kilometres (16 mi) north of the town of Lillehammer. The municipal center of Tingberg lies about 5 kilometres (3.1 mi) to the southeast of Tretten.

The 1.22-square-kilometre (300-acre) village has a population (2024) of 861 and a population density of 706 inhabitants per square kilometre (1,830/sq mi).

== History ==
The village had its own sports team Tretten IL until 1990, when a merger created Øyer-Tretten IF. The village is also the site of Tretten Church which serves the northern part of the municipality.

Tretten was the location of the biggest train disaster in Norway's history. The Tretten train disaster occurred on 22 February 1975 when two passenger trains collided head on. The tragedy resulted in 27 people being killed.

On 15 August 2022, the Tretten Bridge over the Gudbrandsdalslågen river completely collapsed; it had beams of glued laminated timber and others of weathering steel. There were no fatalities. One vehicle driver was rescued by helicopter and the driver of a car escaped by himself.

=== Name ===
The village (and church parish) is named after the old Tretten farm (Old Norse: Þrœttin or Þróttvin) since the first church was built there. This farm is now named Prestgarden which means 'the vicarage'. The first element of the name is þróttr which means 'force' or 'power'. The last element is vin which means 'meadow'. The farm is lying close to the river Moksa, and the first element is probably referring to the stream and the waterfalls in the river here.

== See also ==
- Bridge collapse in 2022
