= Tretten Church =

Church in Innlandet, Norway

- Tretten kirke
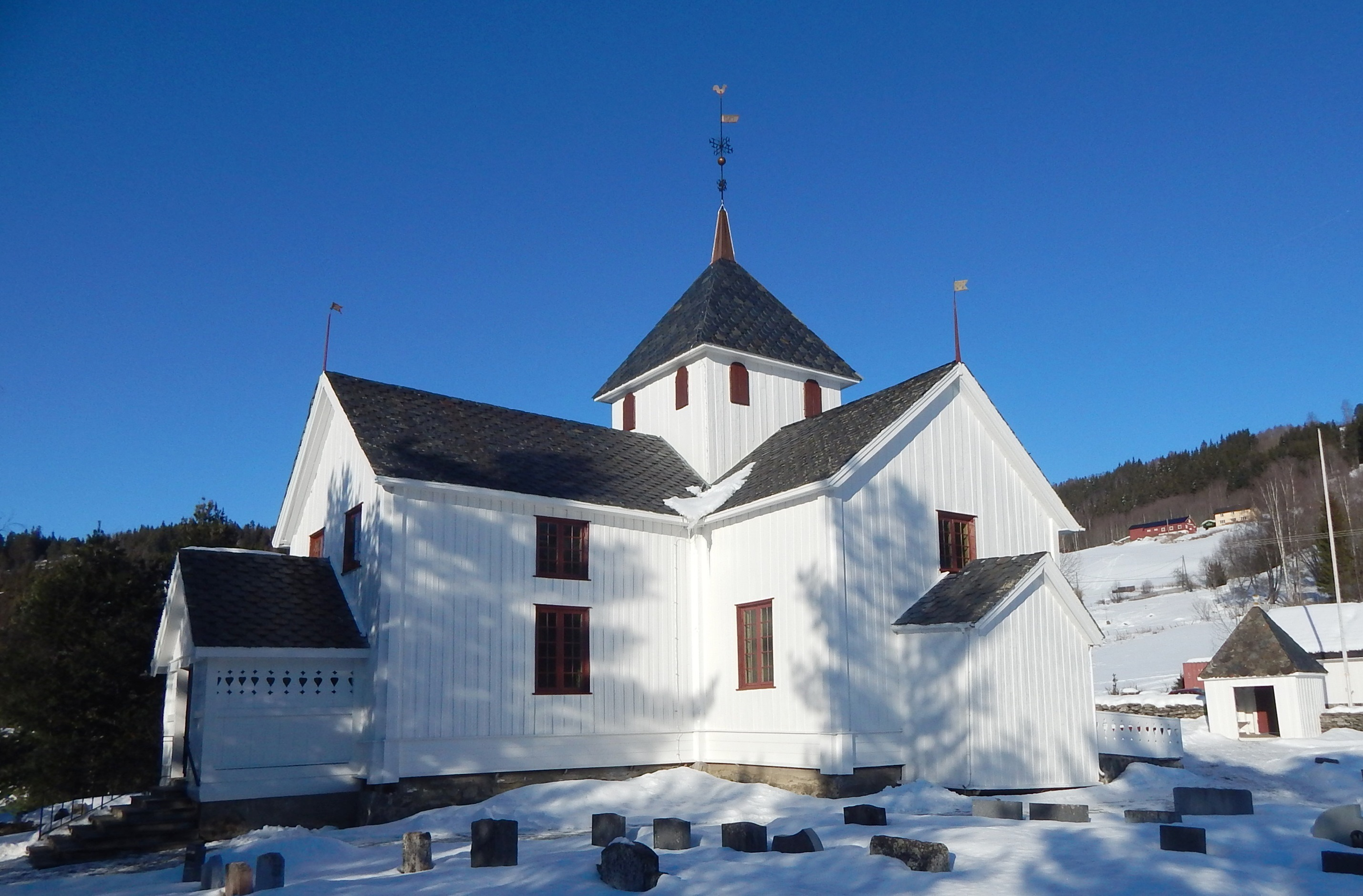
- View of the church
- Tretten Church
- 61°19′04″N 10°18′20″E
- Location: Øyer Municipality, Innlandet
- Country: Norway
- Denomination: Church of Norway
- Previous denomination: Catholic Church
- Churchmanship: Evangelical Lutheran

History
- Status: Parish church
- Founded: 13th century
- Consecrated: 12 September 1728

Architecture
- Functional status: Active
- Architect: Jens Skanke
- Architectural type: Cruciform
- Completed: 1728 (298 years ago)

Specifications
- Capacity: 300
- Materials: Wood

Administration
- Diocese: Hamar bispedømme
- Deanery: Sør-Gudbrandsdal prosti
- Parish: Tretten
- Norwegian Cultural Heritage Site
- Type: Church
- Status: Automatically protected
- ID: 85666

Tretten Church (Norwegian: Tretten kirke) is a parish church of the Church of Norway in Øyer Municipality in Innlandet county, Norway. It is located in the village of Tretten. It is the church for the Tretten parish which is part of the Sør-Gudbrandsdal prosti (deanery) in the Diocese of Hamar. The white, wooden church was built in a cruciform design in 1728 using plans drawn up by the architect Jens Skank. The church seats about 300 people.

The central tower was removed because of damage in 2000 and placed next to the church.

== History ==
The first known church in Tretten was a stone long church that was likely built during the second half of the 13th century. This church was built at Kjørkehaugen, about 1.2 kilometres (0.75 mi) northeast of the present church site. (It is possible that there was a wooden post church on the site before the stone church, but there is no concrete evidence of this.) By the mid-1500s, the old stone church was in poor condition, so between 1586-1588 a new wooden long church was built right next to the old stone church.

By the 1720s, a new main road was built through the valley, about 1.2 kilometres (0.75 mi) to the southwest of the church, and by this time, the old church was getting to be too small for the parish. It was decided at that time to build a new church on a new site, near the new main road. The lead builder was Jens Skanke, the son-in-law of the local parish priest Christian Wolfgang Monrath. The new church was built in 1727-1728 and it was a wooden cruciform building. Some of the stone from the medieval church was reused in the foundation of this new building. The new church was consecrated on 12 September 1728.

Originally, the church had not tower, just a square base with a pyramid shaped roof on top. In 1774-1775, the church was tarred on the outside and a new slate roof was installed. In 1807, the church exterior was painted red and a tower was installed on the roof. Already in 1819, the tower was having structural problems preventing the ringing of the bell. Many attempts at fixing the tower took place over the years. In 1875, the church exterior was painted white and a couple years after this, the slate roof was replaced with a new slate roof and a zinc top was installed on the tower. Again in 1968, the tower was repaired again to reinforce the structure, but this did not last very long. In 1999-2000, the tower had significant rot damage so the tower had to be removed. The old tower was taken down and installed on the ground adjacent to the church. The tower was not replaced until 2015 when a smaller, more modest tower was installed.

== Media gallery ==
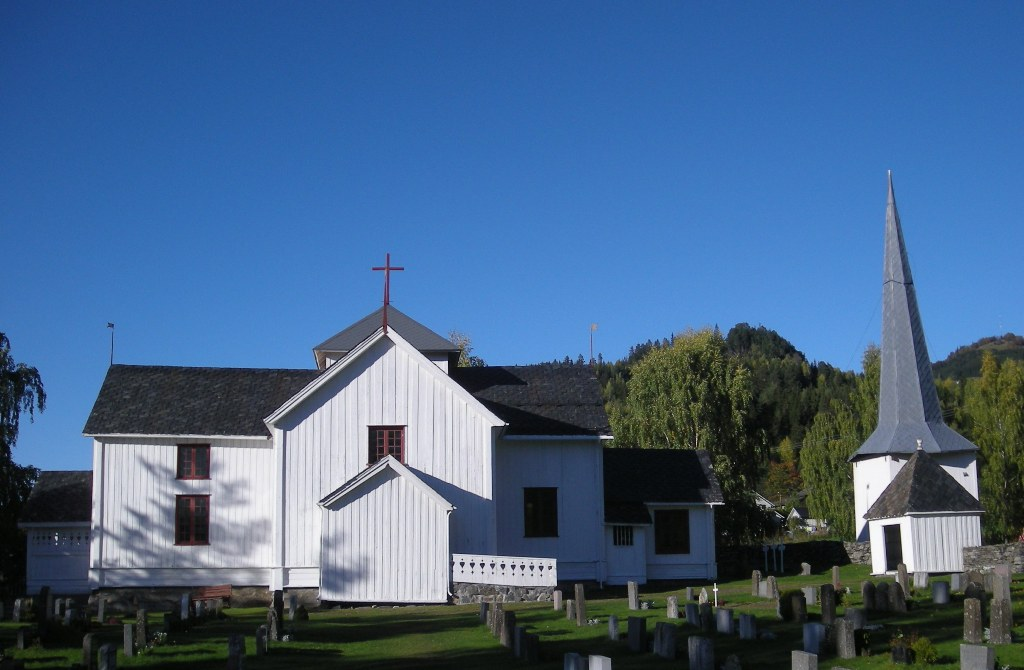

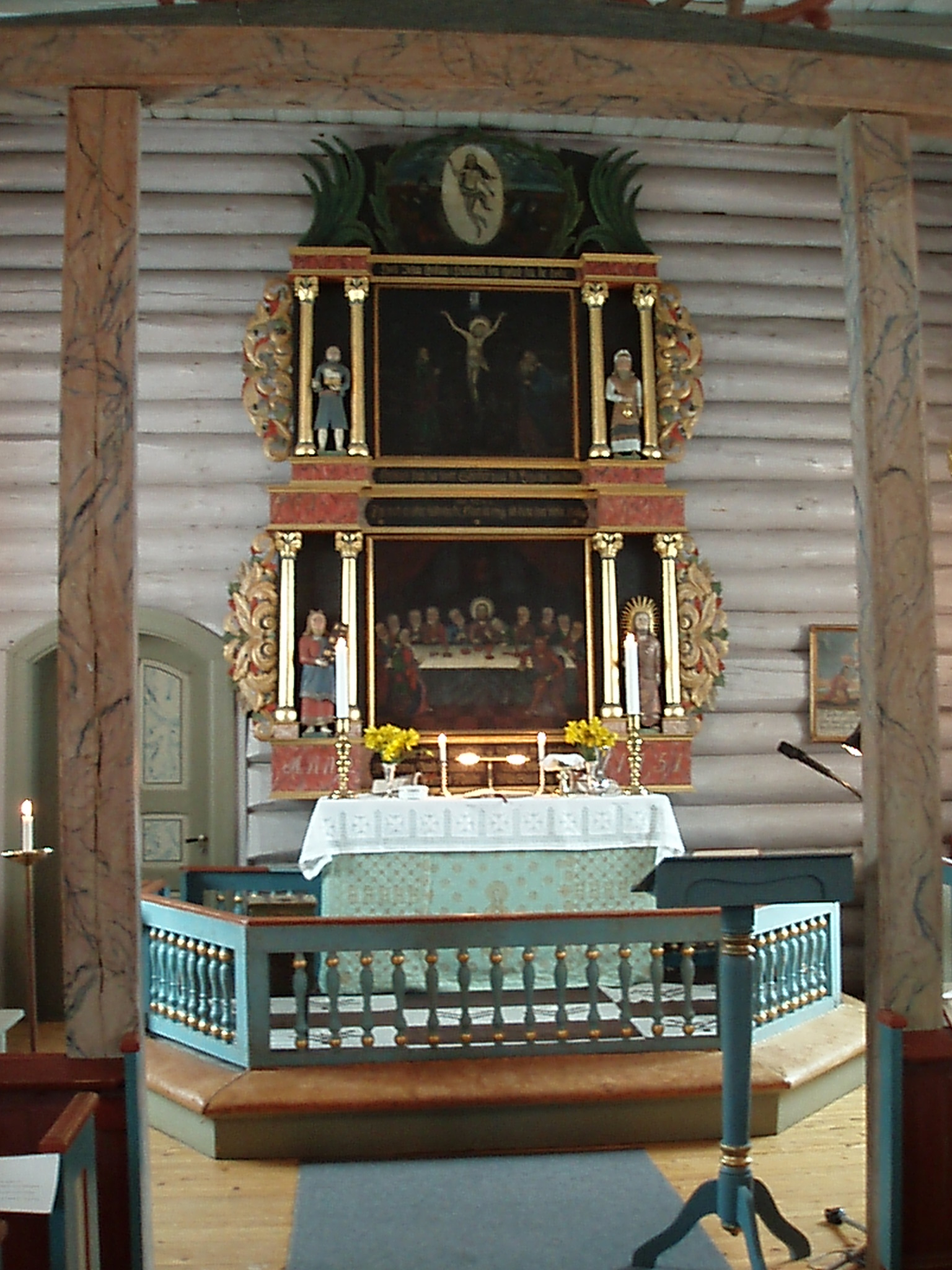

== See also ==
- List of churches in Hamar
