= Dølafe =

Cattle breed

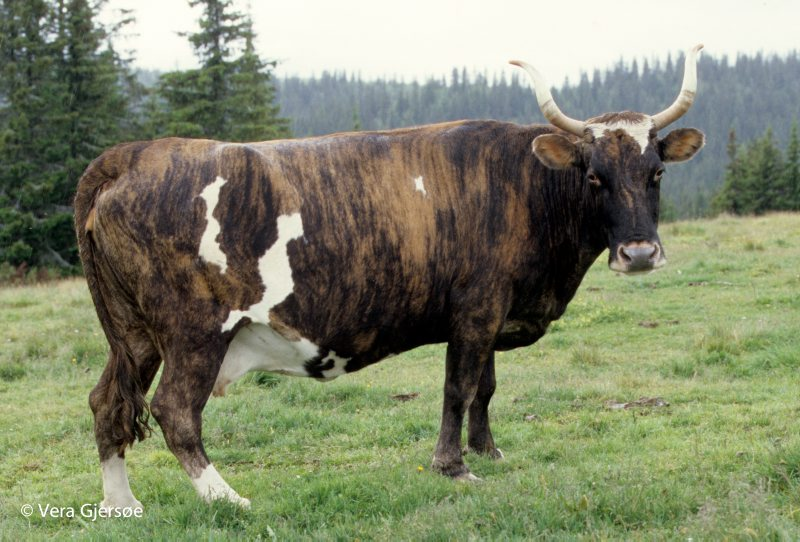
Image of Dølafe

The Dølafe is a rare breed of cattle.

The breed originates from the Gudbrand Valley, Østerdalen and Hedmarken in Norway. These areas offered good conditions for livestock with easy access to rich mountain pastures. Most Dølafe cattle today came from a single herd at Fåvang in the Gudbrand Valley. Once considered to be endangered, since the 1990s, the activity of the breed has increased and the number of animals has increased considerably.

The Dølafe is a small-boned cow with short legs. They are normally horned. It is a multicolored breed, ranging from almost uniformly dark brown to white, brown and black individuals. On average, they weigh approximately 450–500 kilograms (990–1,100 lb).
