= Rigmor Aarø Spiten =

Norwegian politician (born 1943)

Rigmor Aarø Spiten (born 29 March 1943) is a Norwegian politician for the Centre Party.

She served as a deputy representative to the Parliament of Norway for the constituency Oppland during the term 1985–1989. In total she met during 43 days of parliamentary session.
