= Øyer Municipality =

Municipality in Innlandet, Norway

Øyer Municipality Øyer kommune
- Municipality
- Øier herred (historic name)
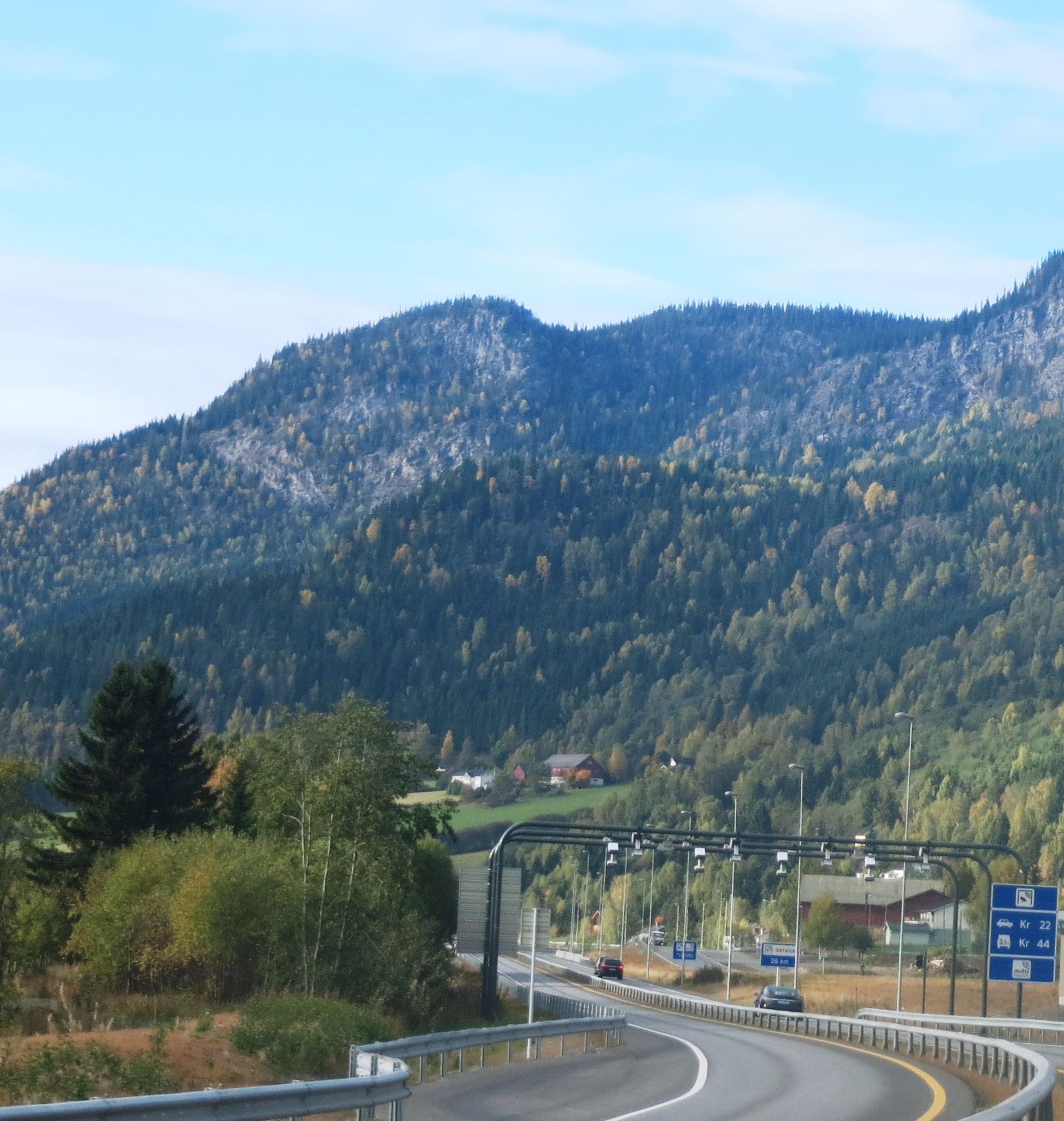
- View of the Øyer area

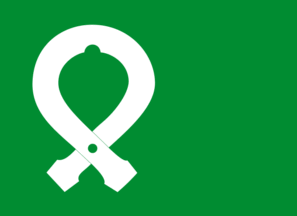
- Flag Coat of arms

- Innlandet within Norway

- Øyer within Innlandet
- Coordinates: 61°15′55″N 10°24′48″E
- Country: Norway
- County: Innlandet
- District: Gudbrandsdal
- Established: 1 Jan 1838
  - Created as: Formannskapsdistrikt
- Administrative centre: Tingberg

Government
  - Mayor (2023): Anne Marie Sveipe (H)

Area
  - Total: 640.13 km^{2} (247.16 sq mi)
  - Land: 616.47 km^{2} (238.02 sq mi)
  - Water: 23.66 km^{2} (9.14 sq mi) 3.7%
  - Rank: #182 in Norway
- Highest elevation: 1,231.81 m (4,041.4 ft)

Population (2025)
  - Total: 5,134
  - Rank: #182 in Norway
  - Density: 8/km^{2} (21/sq mi)
  - Change (10 years): ▲ +0.7%
- Demonym: Øyværing

Official language
  - Norwegian form: Neutral
- Time zone: UTC+01:00 (CET)
  - Summer (DST): UTC+02:00 (CEST)
- ISO 3166 code: NO-3440
- Website: Official website

Øyer is a municipality in Innlandet county, Norway. It is located in the traditional district of Gudbrandsdal. The administrative centre of the municipality is the village of Tingberg. The two largest villages in the municipality are Granrudmoen and Tretten.

The 640-square-kilometre (250 sq mi) municipality is the 182nd largest by area out of the 357 municipalities in Norway. Øyer Municipality is the 182nd most populous municipality in Norway with a population of 5,134. The municipality's population density is 8 inhabitants per square kilometre (21/sq mi) and its population has increased by 0.7% over the previous 10-year period.

== General information ==
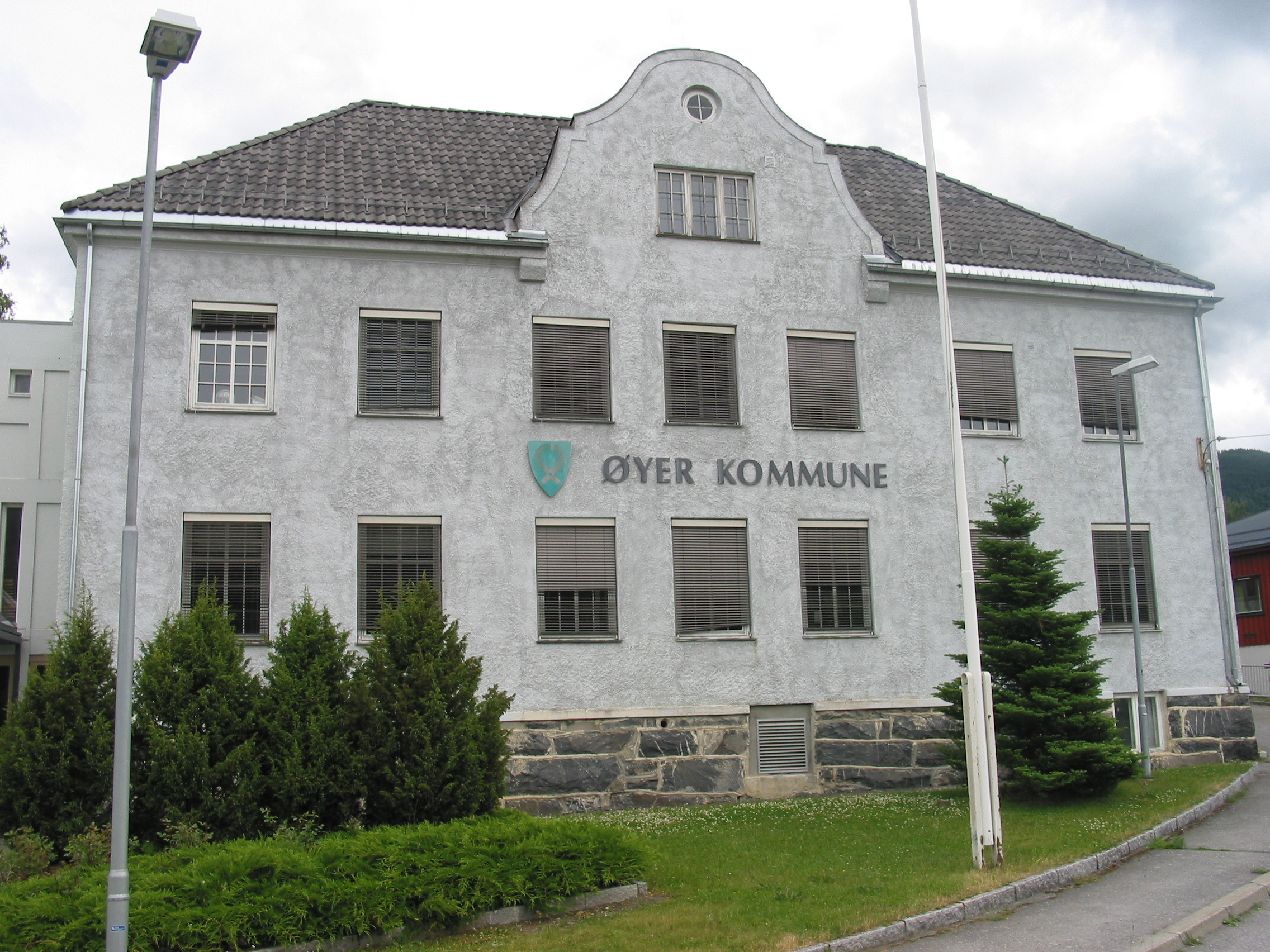
Øyer town hall.

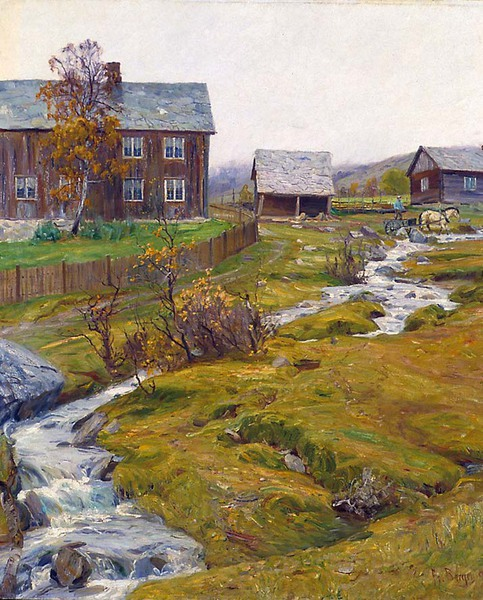
Painting of the Hov farm in Øyer by Fredrik Borgen (1895)

The parish of Øier (later spelled Øyer) was established as a municipality on 1 January 1838 (see formannskapsdistrikt law). On 1 January 1867, a small area of Øier Municipality (population: 40) was transferred to the neighboring Gausdal Municipality. The borders of Øyer Municipality have not changed since that time.

Historically, the municipality was part of the old Oppland county. On 1 January 2020, the municipality became a part of the newly-formed Innlandet county (after Hedmark and Oppland counties were merged).

=== Name ===
The municipality (originally the parish) is named after the old Øier farm (Old Norse: Øyja / accusative case and dative case) since the first Øyer Church had been located there for centuries. The name comes from the word øyi (nominative case). Two lakes in Norway had the name Øyi(r) in Old Norse times (now called Øymark and Øyeren), and these names are derived from the word eyrr which means "flat and fertile land along the edge of the water". This name is probably given to this area because the Gudbrandsdalslågen river widens out in the central part of the municipality and creates two river-lakes (called the Jemnefjorden and Gildbusfjorden). Øyi was probably the old name of one (or both) of these "fjords". Historically, the name of the municipality was spelled Øier. On 3 November 1917, a royal resolution changed the spelling of the name of the municipality to Øyer.

=== Coat of arms ===
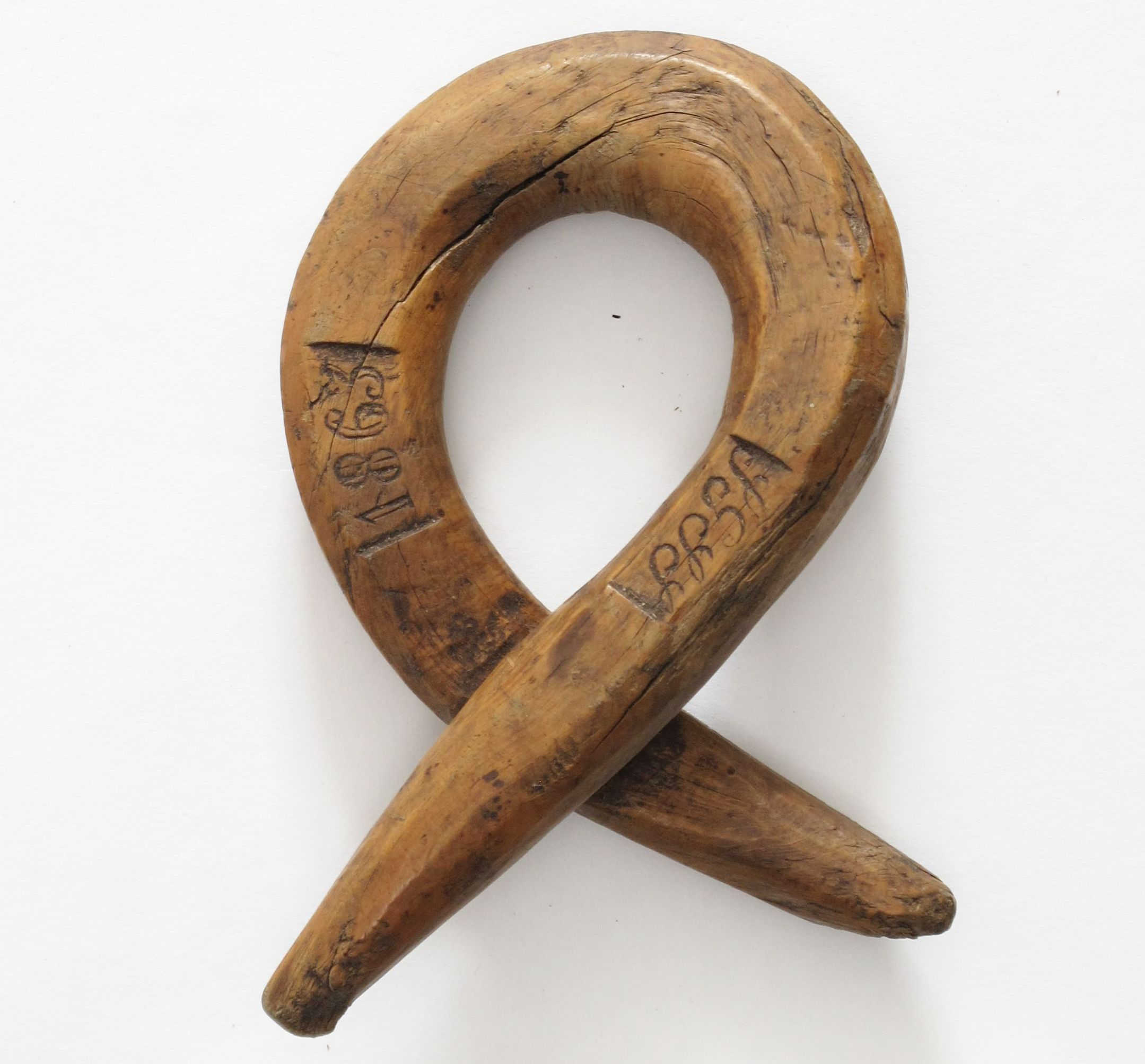
View of a hegd which is the basis for the coat of arms

The coat of arms was granted on 29 April 1983. The official blazon is "Vert, a wooden staple argent" (Norwegian: I grønt ei sølv helder). This means the arms have a green field (background) and the charge is a wooden staple Norwegian: hegd or helder). The charge has a tincture of argent which means it is commonly colored white, but if it is made out of metal, then silver is used. This is a type of ring or staple that was historically made of wood and it was used to fasten a tree trunk to a rope in order to haul it over the land. Similar devices were used all over Norway, but this particular shape is typical for this area. The arms were designed by Ola T. Rybakken. The municipal flag has the same design as the coat of arms, but the staple design is off-center on the flag.

=== Churches ===
The Church of Norway has two parishes (sokn) within Øyer Municipality. It is part of the Sør-Gudbrandsdal prosti (deanery) in the Diocese of Hamar.

Churches in Øyer Municipality
Parish (sokn)	Church name	Location of the church	Year built
Tretten	Tretten Church	Tretten	1728
Øyer	Øyer Church	Tingberg	1725

== History ==
The Black Death reached Norway in the winter of 1349-1350. The area that is now Øyer Municipality was one of the parishes that was most severely impacted. Estimates based on tax payments suggest that between 66 and 75% of all residents died. Many of the farms there became deserted farms (ødegårder), which remained vacant until the late 17th century. The Tretten Church parish (which had been a separate parish from Øyer) was merged with the Øyer Church parish after the Black Death, because the decimated population of Tretten no longer could maintain their own priest.

== Economy ==
Number of minorities (1st and 2nd generation) in Øyer by country of origin in 2017
Ancestry	Number
Poland	71
Lithuania	60
Somalia	55
Bosnia-Herzegovina	52
Denmark	32

Øyer has traditionally been a farming and logging municipality.

Recreation is increasingly important economically. Since it opened in 1989, the Hafjell Alpine Ski Center has grown to include 15 lifts (with an additional in construction) and 28 runs as well as extensive cross-country skiing runs. It is located in Øyer Municipality about 15 kilometres (9.3 mi) from the town of Lillehammer, making it very accessible to a larger population. Tobogganing, luge, and bobsled racing (on the 1994 Olympic course) are also found in the area.

== Government ==
Øyer Municipality is responsible for primary education (through 10th grade), outpatient health services, senior citizen services, welfare and other social services, zoning, economic development, and municipal roads and utilities. The municipality is governed by a municipal council of directly elected representatives. The mayor is indirectly elected by a vote of the municipal council. The municipality is under the jurisdiction of the Gudbrandsdal District Court and the Eidsivating Court of Appeal.

=== Municipal council ===
The municipal council (Kommunestyre) of Øyer Municipality is made up of 21 representatives that are elected to four year terms. The tables below show the current and historical composition of the council by political party.

Øyer kommunestyre 2023–2027
Party name (in Norwegian)	Number of representatives
Labour Party (Arbeiderpartiet)	5
Progress Party (Fremskrittspartiet)	1
Conservative Party (Høyre)	5
Centre Party (Senterpartiet)	7
Socialist Left Party (Sosialistisk Venstreparti)	3
Total number of members:	21

Øyer kommunestyre 2019–2023
Party name (in Norwegian)	Number of representatives
Labour Party (Arbeiderpartiet)	7
Conservative Party (Høyre)	2
Centre Party (Senterpartiet)	10
Socialist Left Party (Sosialistisk Venstreparti)	2
Total number of members:	21

Øyer kommunestyre 2015–2019
Party name (in Norwegian)	Number of representatives
Labour Party (Arbeiderpartiet)	11
Conservative Party (Høyre)	4
Christian Democratic Party (Kristelig Folkeparti)	1
Centre Party (Senterpartiet)	8
Socialist Left Party (Sosialistisk Venstreparti)	1
Total number of members:	25

Øyer kommunestyre 2011–2015
Party name (in Norwegian)	Number of representatives
Labour Party (Arbeiderpartiet)	8
Conservative Party (Høyre)	9
Christian Democratic Party (Kristelig Folkeparti)	1
Centre Party (Senterpartiet)	5
Socialist Left Party (Sosialistisk Venstreparti)	1
Liberal Party (Venstre)	1
Total number of members:	25

Øyer kommunestyre 2007–2011
Party name (in Norwegian)	Number of representatives
Labour Party (Arbeiderpartiet)	8
Conservative Party (Høyre)	5
Christian Democratic Party (Kristelig Folkeparti)	1
Centre Party (Senterpartiet)	7
Socialist Left Party (Sosialistisk Venstreparti)	3
Liberal Party (Venstre)	1
Total number of members:	25

Øyer kommunestyre 2003–2007
Party name (in Norwegian)	Number of representatives
Labour Party (Arbeiderpartiet)	10
Conservative Party (Høyre)	3
Christian Democratic Party (Kristelig Folkeparti)	1
Centre Party (Senterpartiet)	5
Socialist Left Party (Sosialistisk Venstreparti)	3
Øyer Local List (Øyer Bygdeliste)	3
Total number of members:	25

Øyer kommunestyre 1999–2003
Party name (in Norwegian)	Number of representatives
Labour Party (Arbeiderpartiet)	8
Conservative Party (Høyre)	3
Christian Democratic Party (Kristelig Folkeparti)	1
Centre Party (Senterpartiet)	7
Socialist Left Party (Sosialistisk Venstreparti)	1
Øyer Local List (Øyer Bygdeliste)	5
Total number of members:	25

Øyer kommunestyre 1995–1999
Party name (in Norwegian)	Number of representatives
Labour Party (Arbeiderpartiet)	9
Conservative Party (Høyre)	1
Christian Democratic Party (Kristelig Folkeparti)	1
Centre Party (Senterpartiet)	10
Socialist Left Party (Sosialistisk Venstreparti)	1
Øyer Local List (Øyer Bygdeliste)	3
Total number of members:	25

Øyer kommunestyre 1991–1995
Party name (in Norwegian)	Number of representatives
Labour Party (Arbeiderpartiet)	8
Conservative Party (Høyre)	2
Christian Democratic Party (Kristelig Folkeparti)	1
Centre Party (Senterpartiet)	9
Socialist Left Party (Sosialistisk Venstreparti)	2
Local list (Bygdalista)	3
Total number of members:	25

Øyer kommunestyre 1987–1991
Party name (in Norwegian)	Number of representatives
Labour Party (Arbeiderpartiet)	11
Conservative Party (Høyre)	4
Christian Democratic Party (Kristelig Folkeparti)	1
Centre Party (Senterpartiet)	8
Liberal Party (Venstre)	1
Total number of members:	25

Øyer kommunestyre 1983–1987
Party name (in Norwegian)	Number of representatives
Labour Party (Arbeiderpartiet)	12
Conservative Party (Høyre)	3
Christian Democratic Party (Kristelig Folkeparti)	1
Centre Party (Senterpartiet)	8
Liberal Party (Venstre)	1
Total number of members:	25

Øyer kommunestyre 1979–1983
Party name (in Norwegian)	Number of representatives
Labour Party (Arbeiderpartiet)	11
Conservative Party (Høyre)	4
Christian Democratic Party (Kristelig Folkeparti)	1
Centre Party (Senterpartiet)	8
Liberal Party (Venstre)	1
Total number of members:	25

Øyer kommunestyre 1975–1979
Party name (in Norwegian)	Number of representatives
Labour Party (Arbeiderpartiet)	13
Christian Democratic Party (Kristelig Folkeparti)	1
Centre Party (Senterpartiet)	9
Joint list of the Conservative Party and Free Voters (Høyre og Frie Velgere)	2
Total number of members:	25

Øyer kommunestyre 1971–1975
Party name (in Norwegian)	Number of representatives
Labour Party (Arbeiderpartiet)	12
Conservative Party (Høyre)	1
Christian Democratic Party (Kristelig Folkeparti)	1
Centre Party (Senterpartiet)	10
Liberal Party (Venstre)	1
Total number of members:	25

Øyer kommunestyre 1967–1971
Party name (in Norwegian)	Number of representatives
Labour Party (Arbeiderpartiet)	12
Conservative Party (Høyre)	1
Christian Democratic Party (Kristelig Folkeparti)	1
Centre Party (Senterpartiet)	9
Liberal Party (Venstre)	2
Total number of members:	25

Øyer kommunestyre 1963–1967
Party name (in Norwegian)	Number of representatives
Labour Party (Arbeiderpartiet)	12
Conservative Party (Høyre)	1
Christian Democratic Party (Kristelig Folkeparti)	1
Centre Party (Senterpartiet)	9
Liberal Party (Venstre)	2
Total number of members:	25

Øyer herredsstyre 1959–1963
Party name (in Norwegian)	Number of representatives
Labour Party (Arbeiderpartiet)	10
Conservative Party (Høyre)	1
Christian Democratic Party (Kristelig Folkeparti)	1
Centre Party (Senterpartiet)	9
Liberal Party (Venstre)	4
Total number of members:	25

Øyer herredsstyre 1955–1959
Party name (in Norwegian)	Number of representatives
Labour Party (Arbeiderpartiet)	12
Conservative Party (Høyre)	1
Christian Democratic Party (Kristelig Folkeparti)	1
Farmers' Party (Bondepartiet)	8
Liberal Party (Venstre)	3
Total number of members:	25

Øyer herredsstyre 1951–1955
Party name (in Norwegian)	Number of representatives
Labour Party (Arbeiderpartiet)	11
Christian Democratic Party (Kristelig Folkeparti)	1
Joint List(s) of Non-Socialist Parties (Borgerlige Felleslister)	12
Total number of members:	24

Øyer herredsstyre 1947–1951
Party name (in Norwegian)	Number of representatives
Labour Party (Arbeiderpartiet)	11
Farmers' Party (Bondepartiet)	10
Joint list of the Liberal Party (Venstre) and the Radical People's Party (Radikale Folkepartiet)	3
Total number of members:	24

Øyer herredsstyre 1945–1947
Party name (in Norwegian)	Number of representatives
Labour Party (Arbeiderpartiet)	10
Farmers' Party (Bondepartiet)	9
Joint list of the Liberal Party (Venstre) and the Radical People's Party (Radikale Folkepartiet)	5
Total number of members:	24

Øyer herredsstyre 1937–1940*
Party name (in Norwegian)	Number of representatives
Labour Party (Arbeiderpartiet)	9
Radical People's Party (Radikale Folkepartiet)	4
Farmers' Party (Bondepartiet)	11
Total number of members:	24
Note: Due to the German occupation of Norway during World War II, no elections were held for new municipal councils until after the war ended in 1945.

=== Mayors ===
The mayor (Norwegian: ordfører) of Øyer Municipality is the political leader of the municipality and the chairperson of the municipal council. Here is a list of people who have held this position:

- 1838–1843: Rev. H.C. Nissen
- 1844–1859: Amund Østensen Tande
- 1860–1861: Niels J. Skaaden
- 1862–1863: Ole Bøe
- 1864–1867: C.W. Bjerck
- 1868–1871: Johannes Bøe
- 1872–1873: Simen Skjønsberg
- 1874–1885: Ole J. Moe
- 1886–1897: Christian Hunder
- 1897–1901: Ole Torgersen Gillebo (V)
- 1902–1910: Christian Mageli
- 1911–1916: Ole Torgersen Gillebo (V)
- 1917–1919: Kristian Bjørnstad
- 1920–1922: Martin H. Lunke (Bp)
- 1923–1925: Ole Torgersen Gillebo (V)
- 1926–1931: Ole Hageløkken (AD)
- 1932–1934: John Vedum (Bp)
- 1935–1941: Thor Mageli (Bp)
- 1942–1945: Andreas Bjørge (NS)
- 1945–1946: Thor Mageli (Bp)
- 1946–1947: Ole Hageløkken (V)
- 1948–1955: Erling Skjønsberg (Bp)
- 1956–1959: Einar Bræin (V)
- 1960–1975: Lars Bjerke (Sp)
- 1976–1979: Geir Korslund (Ap)
- 1980–1983: Einar Moe (Sp)
- 1984–1987: Arne Bueie (Ap)
- 1988–1995: Ola Prestegarden (Sp)
- 1996–1999: Rigmor Aarø Spiten (Sp)
- 1999–2007: Ole Hageløkken (Ap)
- 2007–2015: Mari Botterud (H)
- 2015–2019: Brit Kramprud Lundgård (Ap)
- 2019–2023: Jon Halvor Midtmageli (Sp)
- 2023–present: Anne Marie Sveipe (H)

== Geography ==
Øyer Municipality is bordered by Ringebu Municipality to the north, Stor-Elvdal Municipality to the east, Ringsaker Municipality to the southeast, Lillehammer Municipality to the south, and Gausdal Municipality to the west. The municipality is divided into two parishes: Øyer in the south and Tretten in the north.

The municipality is located in the Gudbrandsdal valley, through which the Gudbrandsdalslågen river flows. The lake Losna is partially located in the municipality. The highest point in the municipality is the 1,231.81-metre (4,041.4 ft) tall mountain Eldåhøgda, a tripoint on the border of Øyer Municipality, Ringebu Municipality, and Stor-Elvdal Municipality.

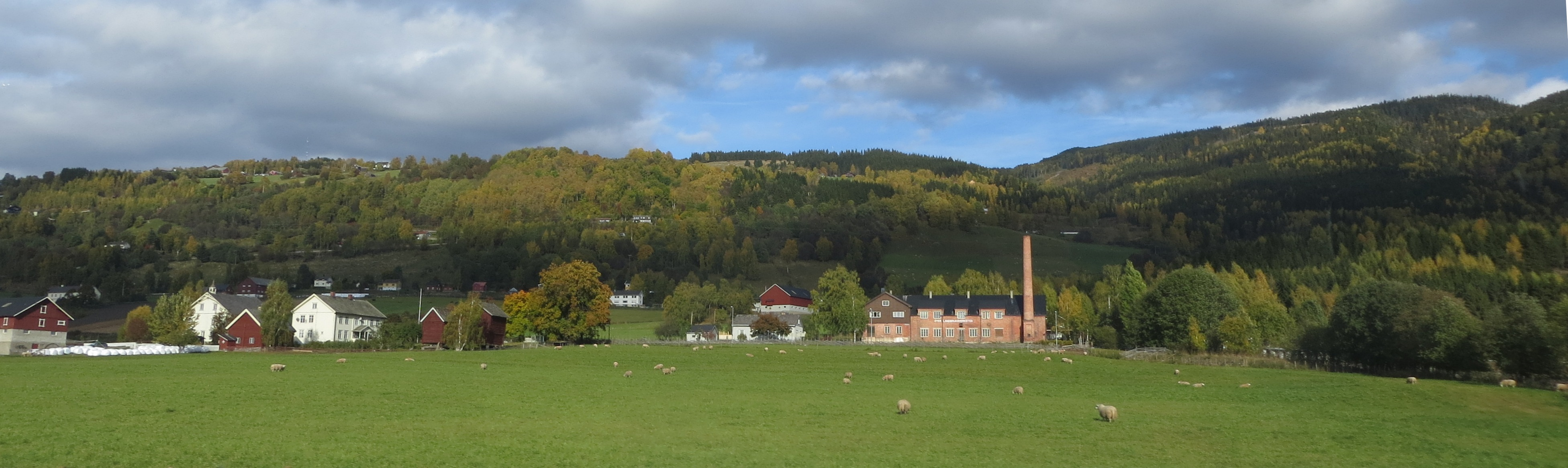
Image from the municipality of Øyer in Innlandet county

== Notable people ==
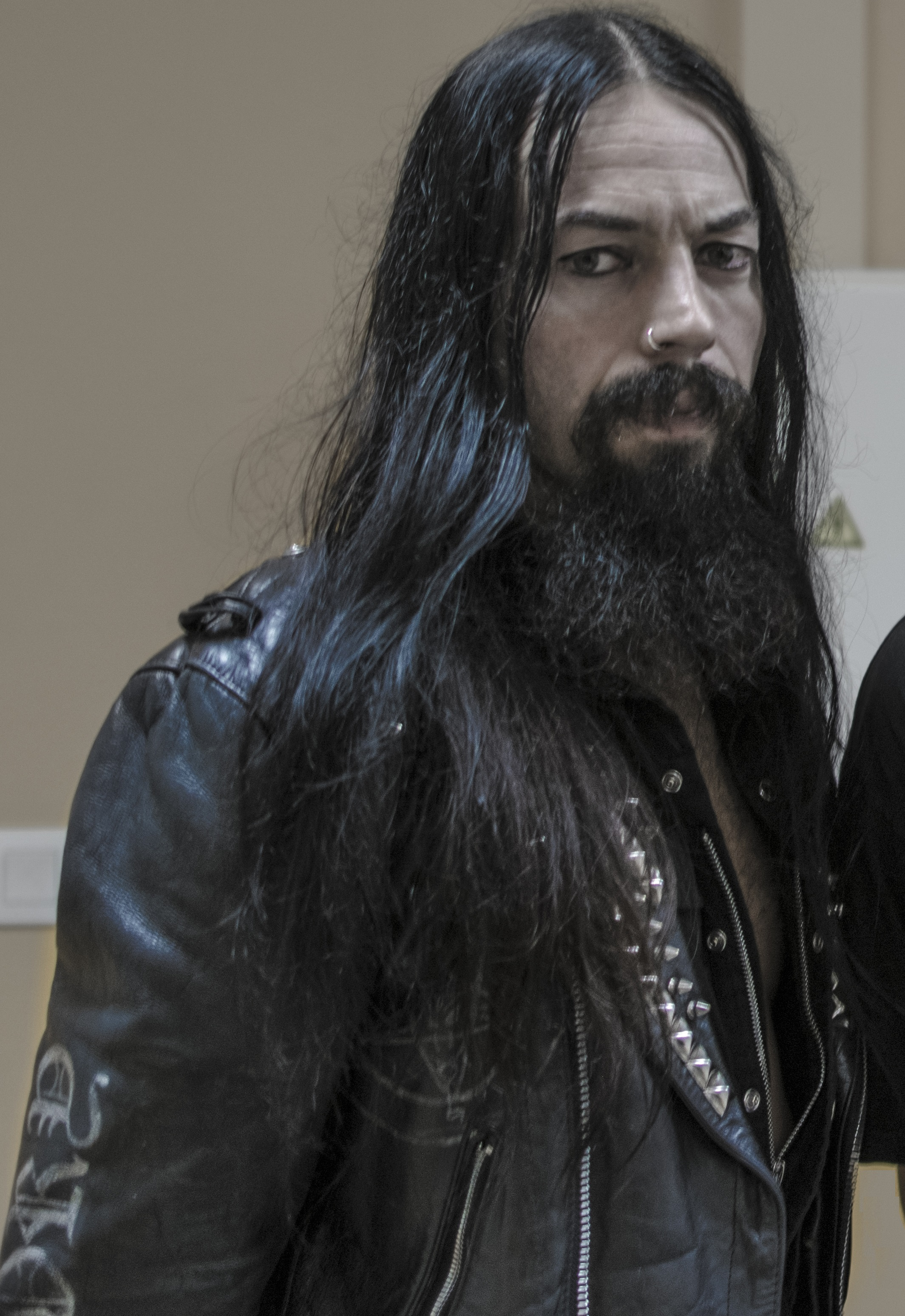
Kjetil Haraldstad, 2017

- Anders Lysgaard (1756 in Tretten – 1827), a farmer, sheriff, and representative at the Norwegian Constituent Assembly
- Johannes Skar (1837 in Øyer - 1914), an educator and folklorist
- Matias Skard (1846 at Øyer - 1927), a philologist, educator, psalmist, and essayist
- Anton Kraabel (1862 in Øyer – 1934), the 11th Lieutenant Governor of North Dakota in the USA
- Simon Johnson (1874 in Øyer – 1970), a Norwegian-American newspaper editor and author
- Ottar Grepstad (born 1953 in Øyer), a Norwegian Nynorsk writer
- Kjetil-Vidar Haraldstad (born 1973 in Øyer), a drummer in black metal bands Satyricon and 1349

=== Sport ===
- Ole Stenen (1903 in Øyer – 1975), a Nordic skier and silver medallist at the 1932 Winter Olympics
- Erling Jevne (born 1966), a skier who was a team gold and silver medallist at the 1998 Winter Olympics
- Roger Hjelmstadstuen (born 1979 in Øyer), a retired snowboarder who competed at the 1998 Winter Olympics
- Aleksander Melås (born 1998 in Øyer), a retired luger

== Twin towns – sister cities ==
Øyer has sister city agreements with the following places:

- Färgelanda, Sweden
- Muhos, Finland
