= Øyer Church =

Church in Innlandet, Norway

- Øyer kirke
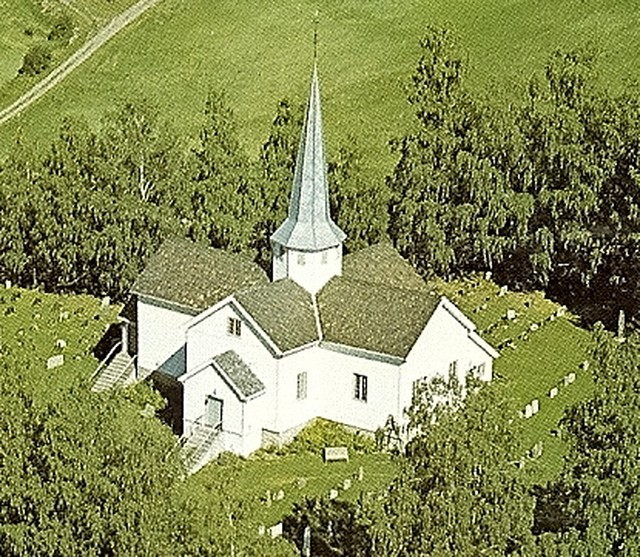
- View of the church
- Øyer Church
- 61°15′58″N 10°25′20″E
- Location: Øyer Municipality, Innlandet
- Country: Norway
- Denomination: Church of Norway
- Previous denomination: Catholic Church
- Churchmanship: Evangelical Lutheran

History
- Former name: Orrestad kirke
- Status: Parish church
- Founded: 13th century
- Consecrated: 2 July 1725

Architecture
- Functional status: Active
- Architectural type: Cruciform
- Completed: 1725 (301 years ago)

Specifications
- Capacity: 300
- Materials: Wood

Administration
- Diocese: Hamar bispedømme
- Deanery: Sør-Gudbrandsdal prosti
- Parish: Øyer
- Norwegian Cultural Heritage Site
- Type: Church
- Status: Automatically protected
- ID: 85937

Øyer Church (Norwegian: Øyer kirke) is a parish church of the Church of Norway in Øyer Municipality in Innlandet county, Norway. It is located in the village of Tingberg. It is the church for the Øyer parish which is part of the Sør-Gudbrandsdal prosti (deanery) in the Diocese of Hamar. The white, wooden church was built in a cruciform design in 1725 using plans drawn up by an unknown architect. The church seats about 300 people.

There is a cemetery at the church. In 2010, Bruvin Cemetery was opened southeast of the village to supplement the church cemetery.

== History ==
The earliest existing historical records of the church date back to the 14th century, but the church was not new at that time. The first church in Øyer was a wooden stave church that was likely built in the 13th century on the same site as the present church. Historically, the church was also known as Orrestad Church. In 1722, the old church was struck by lightning and it burned to the ground. Soon after, a new timber-framed cruciform building was constructed on the same site. The architect of the building is not known. The new church was consecrated on 2 July 1725. Sometime between 1748 and 1775, a tower was built on the church (before that time, the church had no tower). The church was originally tarred on the outside, then later it was painted red. Since 1875, the church has been painted white.

In 1814, this church served as an election church (Norwegian: valgkirke). Together with more than 300 other parish churches across Norway, it was a polling station for elections to the 1814 Norwegian Constituent Assembly which wrote the Constitution of Norway. This was Norway's first national elections. Each church parish was a constituency that elected people called "electors" who later met together in each county to elect the representatives for the assembly that was to meet at Eidsvoll Manor later that year.

== Media gallery ==
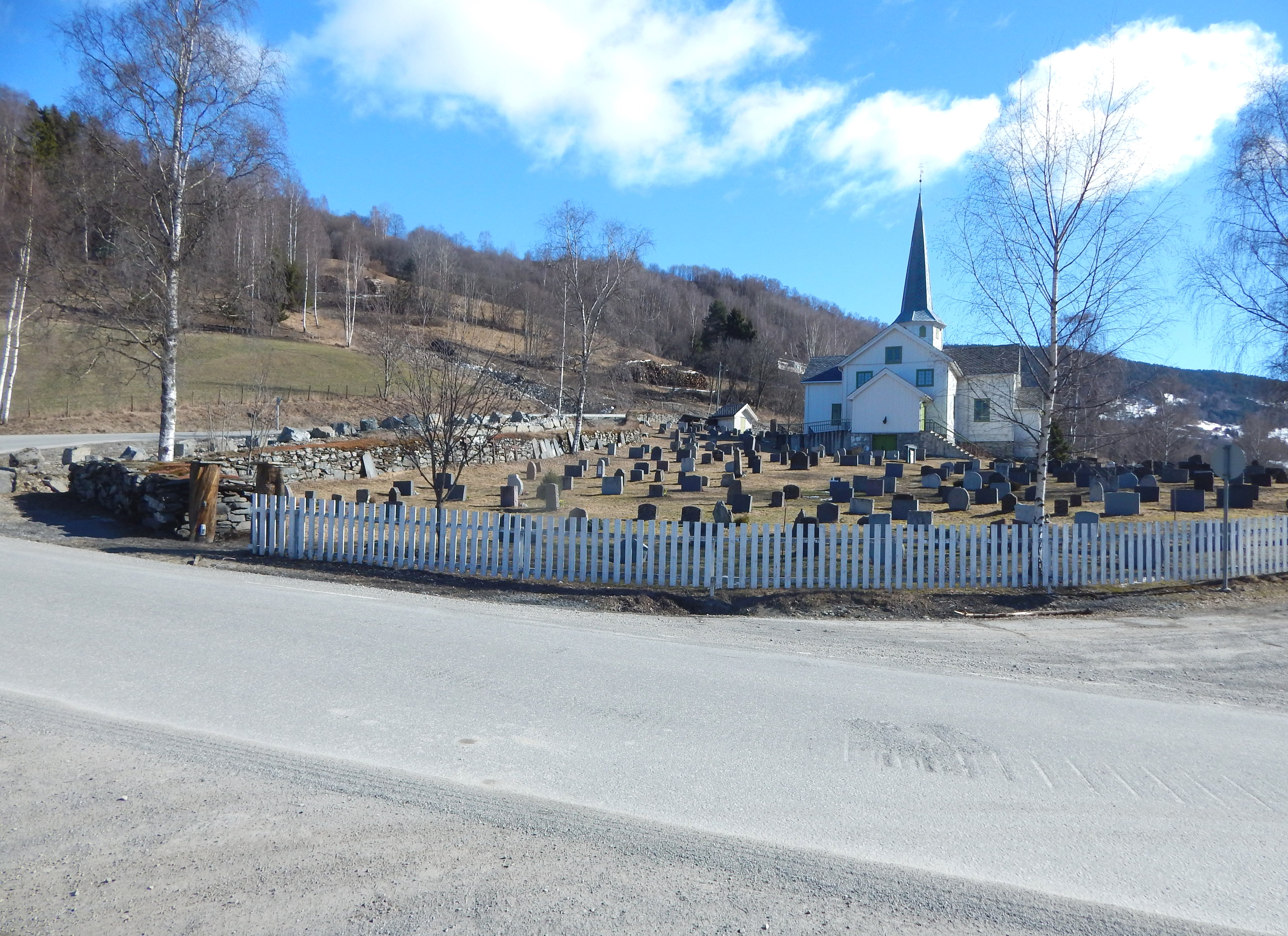

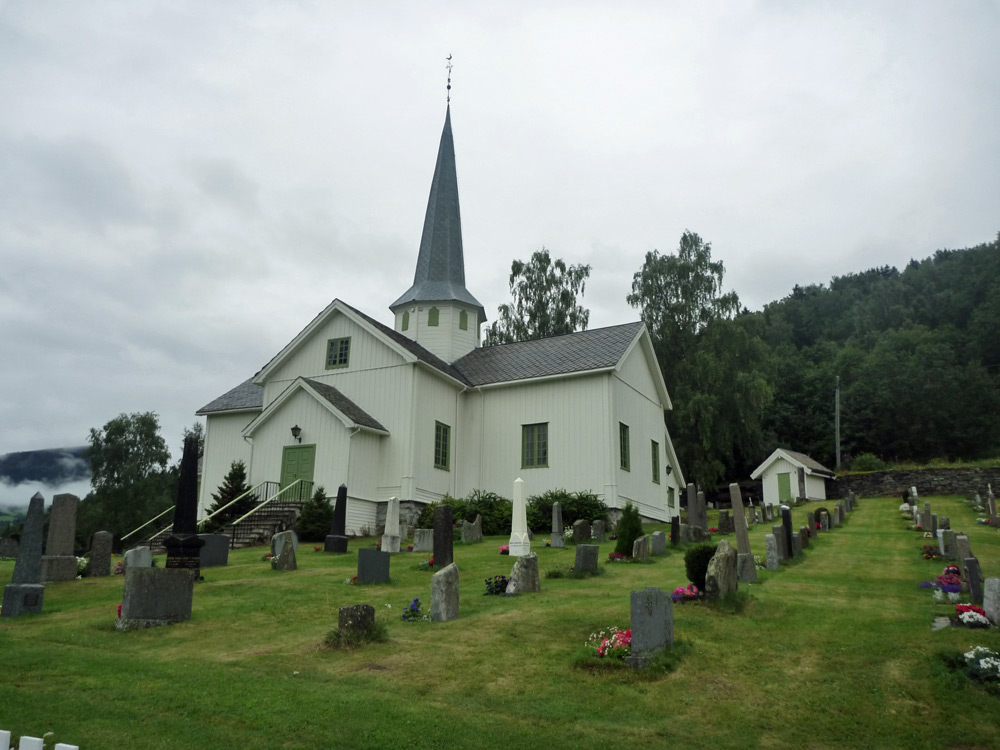

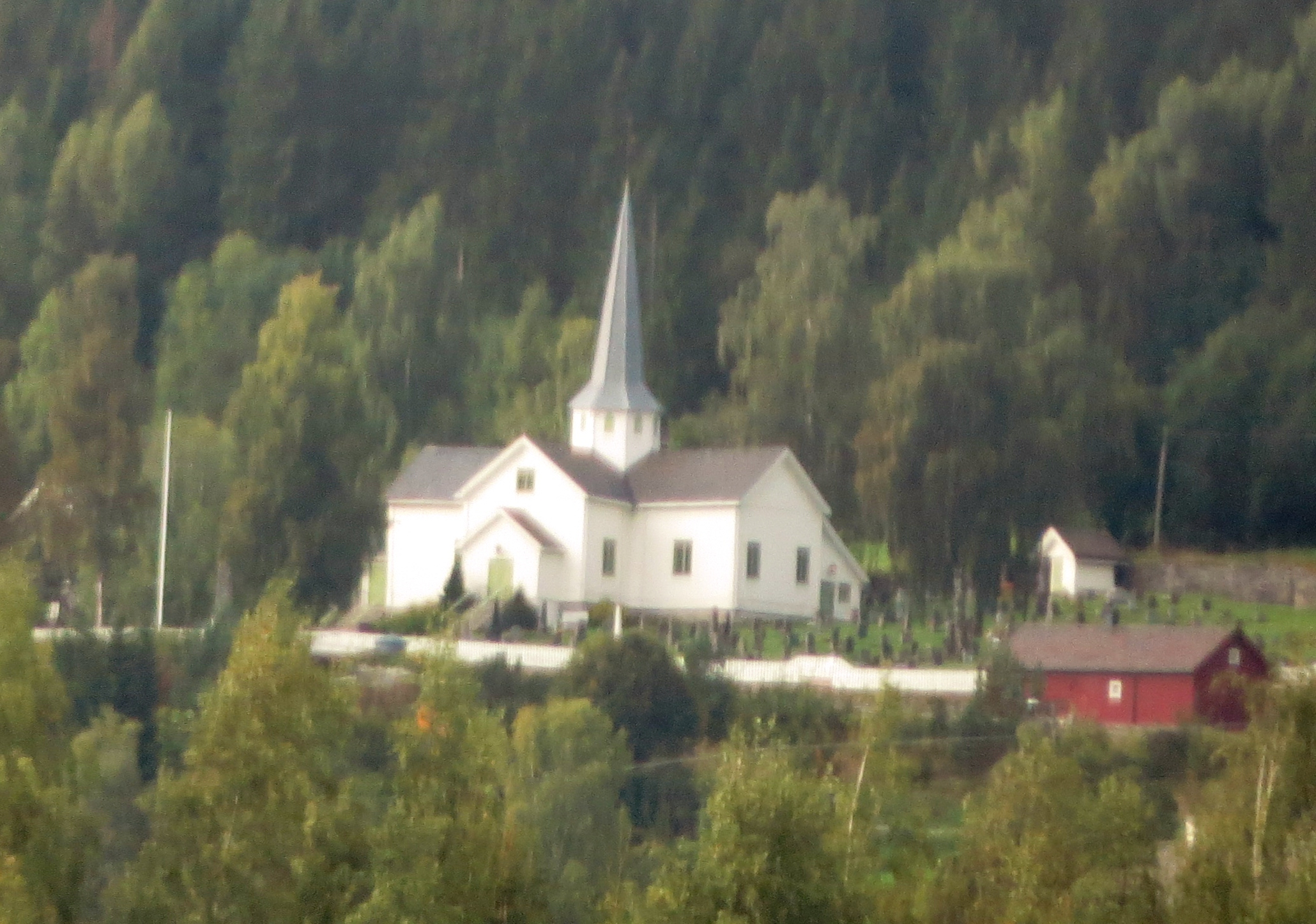

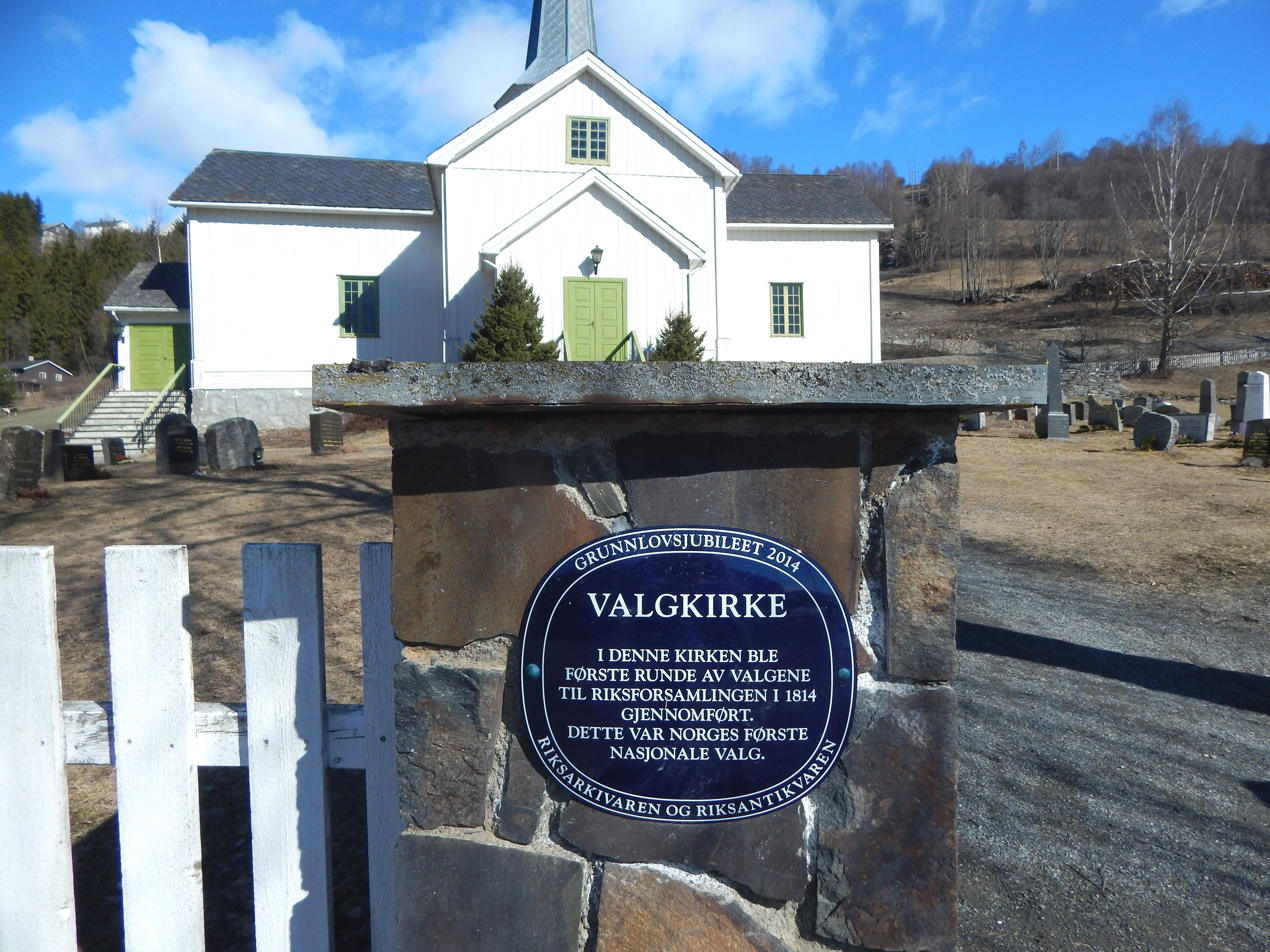

== See also ==
- List of churches in Hamar
