= Gudbrandsdalslågen =

River in Norway

Lågen Gudbrandsdalslågen
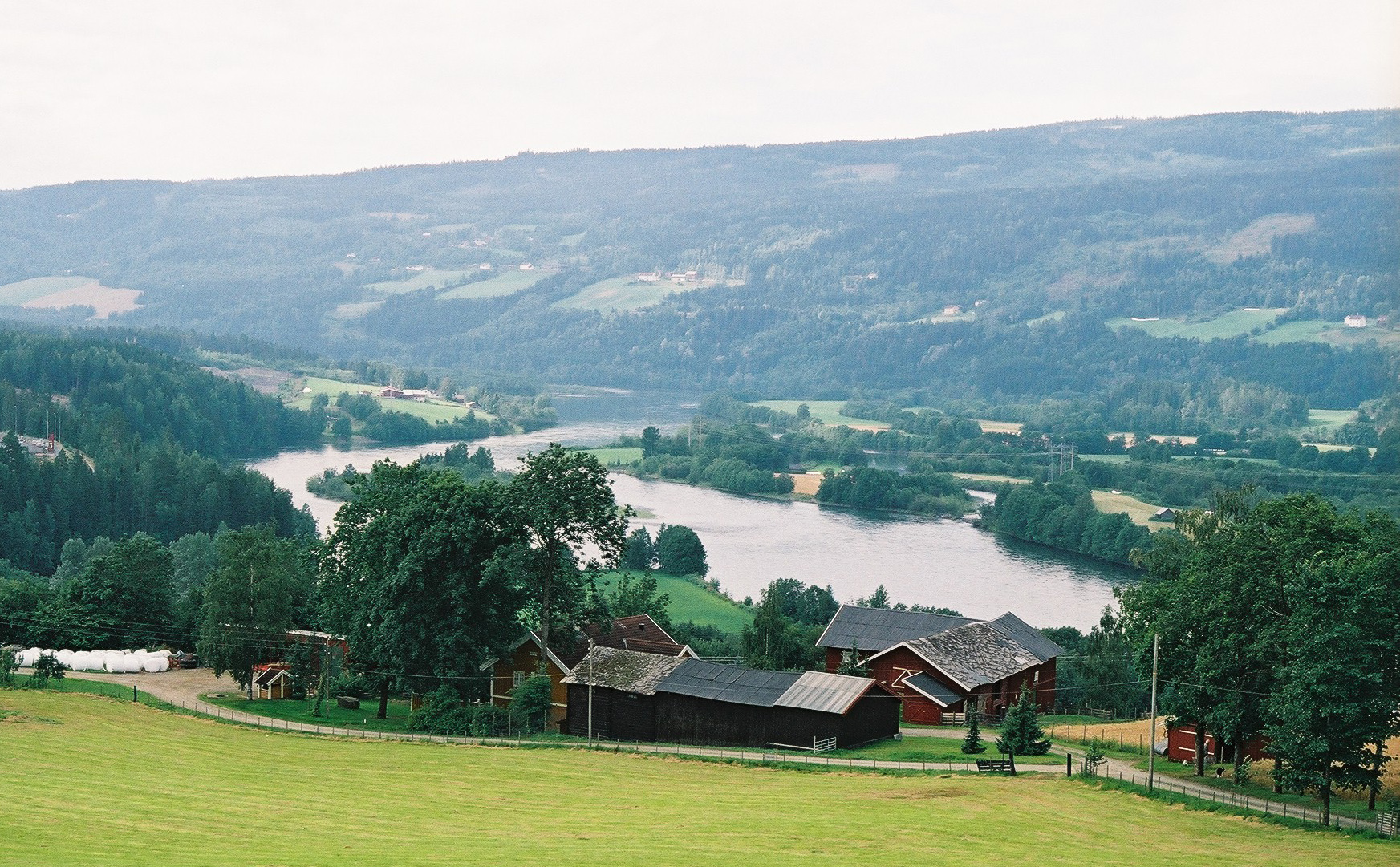

Location
- Country: Norway
- County: Innlandet
- Municipalities: List: Lesja; Dovre; Sel; Nord-Fron; Sør-Fron; Ringebu; Øyer; Lillehammer

Physical characteristics
- Source: Lesjaskogsvatnet
  - location: Lesjaverk, Norway
  - coordinates: 62.1893977°N 8.53775024°E
  - elevation: 611 metres (2,005 ft)
- Mouth: Lake Mjøsa
  - location: Jørstadmoen, Norway
  - coordinates: 61.127987°N 10.4061126°E
  - elevation: 121 metres (397 ft)
- Length: 204 km (127 mi)
- Basin size: 11,459 km^{2} (4,424 sq mi)
- Discharge
  - average: 255 m^{3}/s (9,000 cu ft/s)

Gudbrandsdalslågen or simply Lågen is a river which flows through the Gudbrandsdalen valley in Innlandet county, Norway. The 204-kilometre (127 mi) long river runs through a large valley in Eastern Norway before emptying into Mjøsa, the largest lake in Norway. The river flows through the municipalities of Lesja, Dovre, Sel, Nord-Fron, Sør-Fron, Ringebu, Øyer, and Lillehammer.

== Watercourse ==
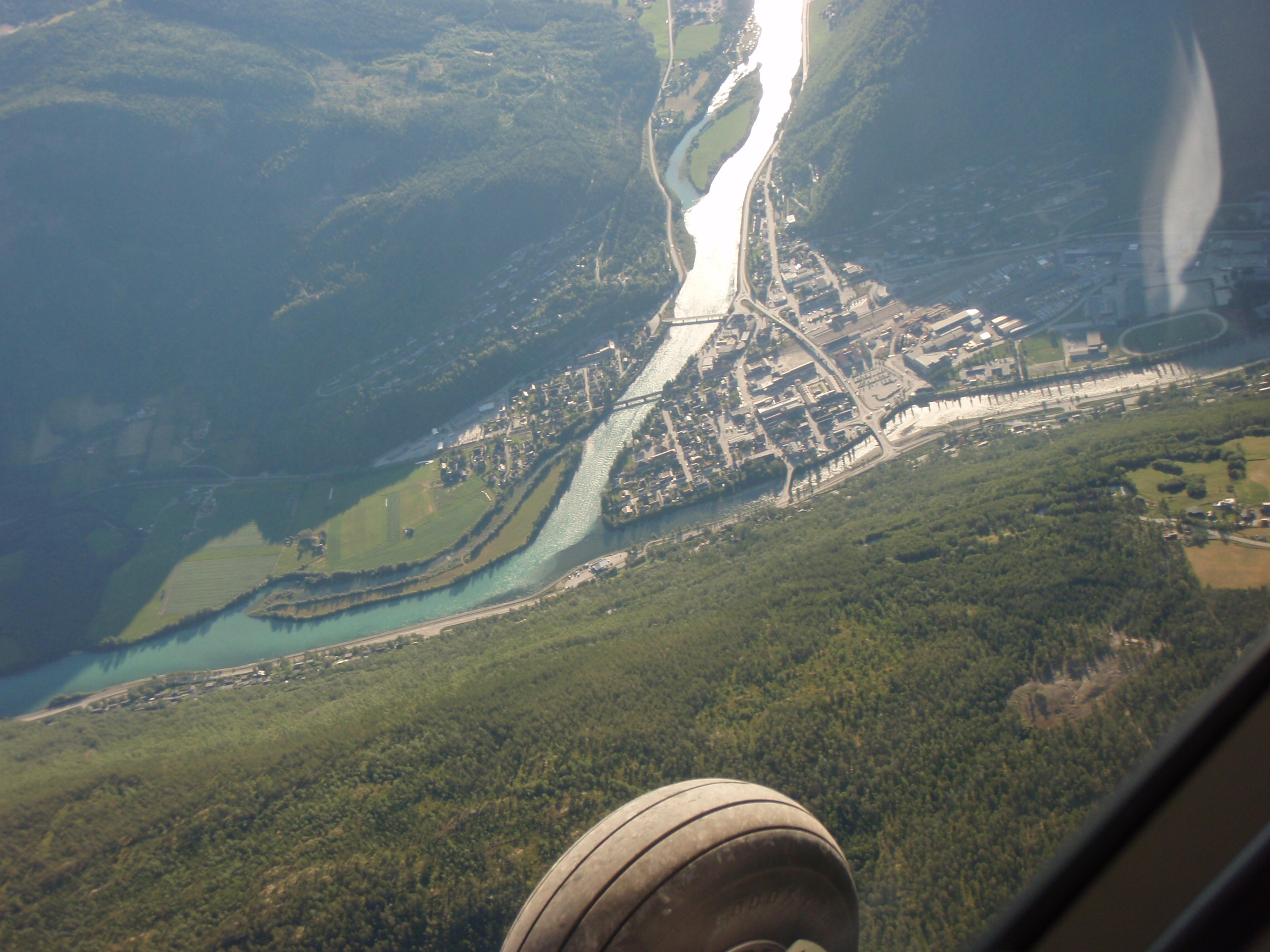
The confluence of the river Otta (entering from top) and Lågen (entering from the right). Otta river has a milky-turquoise appearance from rock flour from glaciers upstream, such as Jotunheimen.

The Gudbrandsdalslågen begins in the lake Lesjaskogsvatnet (or Lesjavatn), which lies in Lesja Municipality in the far northern part of the county. Lesjavatn is the only lake in Norway which has two outlets, and they both flow into two of Norway's more famous rivers. In the southeast at the village of Lesjaverk, the lake serves as the headwaters for the Gudbrandsdalslågen, while in the northwest at Lesjaskog village, Lesjavatn is the headwaters for the Rauma river which heads to the west.

The Gudbrandsdalslågen river flows through the Gudbrandsdal valley. Western tributaries of the Gudbrandsdalslågen include the Gausa River flowing through the Gausdal valley, the Otta River flowing through the Ottadalen valley, the Vinstra River flowing through Vinstradalen, and the Sjoa River, flowing through the Heidal valley. The eastern rivers, Jora, Ula, Frya, Tromsa, and Mesna are shorter and drop precipitously from the heights of the Rondane mountains. Although relatively placid for extended stretches of its 204-kilometre (127 mi) path, the Gudbrandsdalslågen drops rapidly through the Rosten Gorge in Sel Municipality.

Between Ringebu Municipality and Øyer Municipality the river widens out and creates the large so-called "river-lake" of Losna.

The Gudbrandsdalslågen terminates in the lake of Mjøsa at the town of Lillehammer. It is the largest river flowing into this lake. The lake discharges into the short Vorma River which in turn flows into the Glomma River near Årnes in Nes Municipality in Akershus county.

== Flooding ==
Norwegian rivers crest in the spring as the snow melts. The Gudbrandsdalslågen, draining higher elevations and being primarily glacier fed, typically crests later than the Glomma river, which drains the east valleys. In the rare year when both crest at the same time, their confluence in Nes Municipality is the site of great floods. The most famous simultaneous crest of the Gudbrandsdalslågen and Glomma rivers resulted in the Storofsen flood that took place on 20–23 July 1789, with crests over 50 feet (15 m) above the average level of the water. At the lake Øyeren which is beyond Nes there was extensive damage, including 68 casualties.

== Bridge Collapses ==
In 2016, the Perkolo Bridge over the Gudbrandsdalslågen at Sjoa collapsed. The bridge was made of glued laminated timber. After the 2016 collapse, 11 similar bridges, including the one in Tretten, were closed temporarily.

On 15 August 2022 the bridge over the Gudbrandsdalslågen, near the village of Tretten collapsed. The 150-metre (490 ft) wooden bridge had opened in 2012. A lorry driver was rescued by helicopter and a car driver escaped by himself. "It is completely catastrophic, completely unreal," local mayor Jon Halvor Midtmageli told Norway's Dagbladet newspaper. The Tretten bridge was last checked in 2021.

On 14 August 2023 a railway bridge near the village of Ringebu collapsed after heavy rain had caused damage to the central bridge foundation. Nobody was hurt or injured.

== Etymology ==
Lågen is the finite form of låg (Old Norse: lǫgr) which means "water" or "river". The meaning is just 'the river', and this term must have replaced an old name that is now forgotten and unknown. The word lågen is somewhat common in the Norwegian language as a suffix meaning river. The first part of the river name is often the name of the valley in which the river is located (the Gudbrandsdalen valley in this case). Examples of this use include Gudbrandsdalslågen, Numedalslågen, and Suldalslågen.

== Species ==
The Hunder trout is bred at the Hunderfossen waterfall on the Gudbrandsdalslågen river, by the 280-metre (920 ft) long power station dam. Next to the dam, there is an outdoor exhibition centre for hunder trout. There is a hatchery on the west bank; it produces 20,000 hunder trout every year and releases them into the river to compensate for the loss of fish and of spawning grounds when the power plant was established.

== Media gallery ==
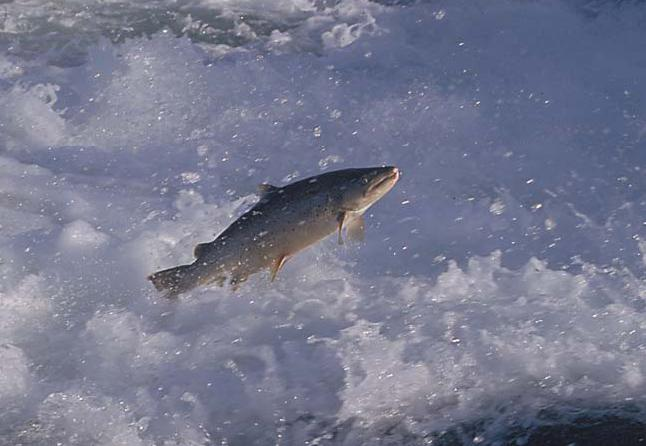
Hundertrout spawning

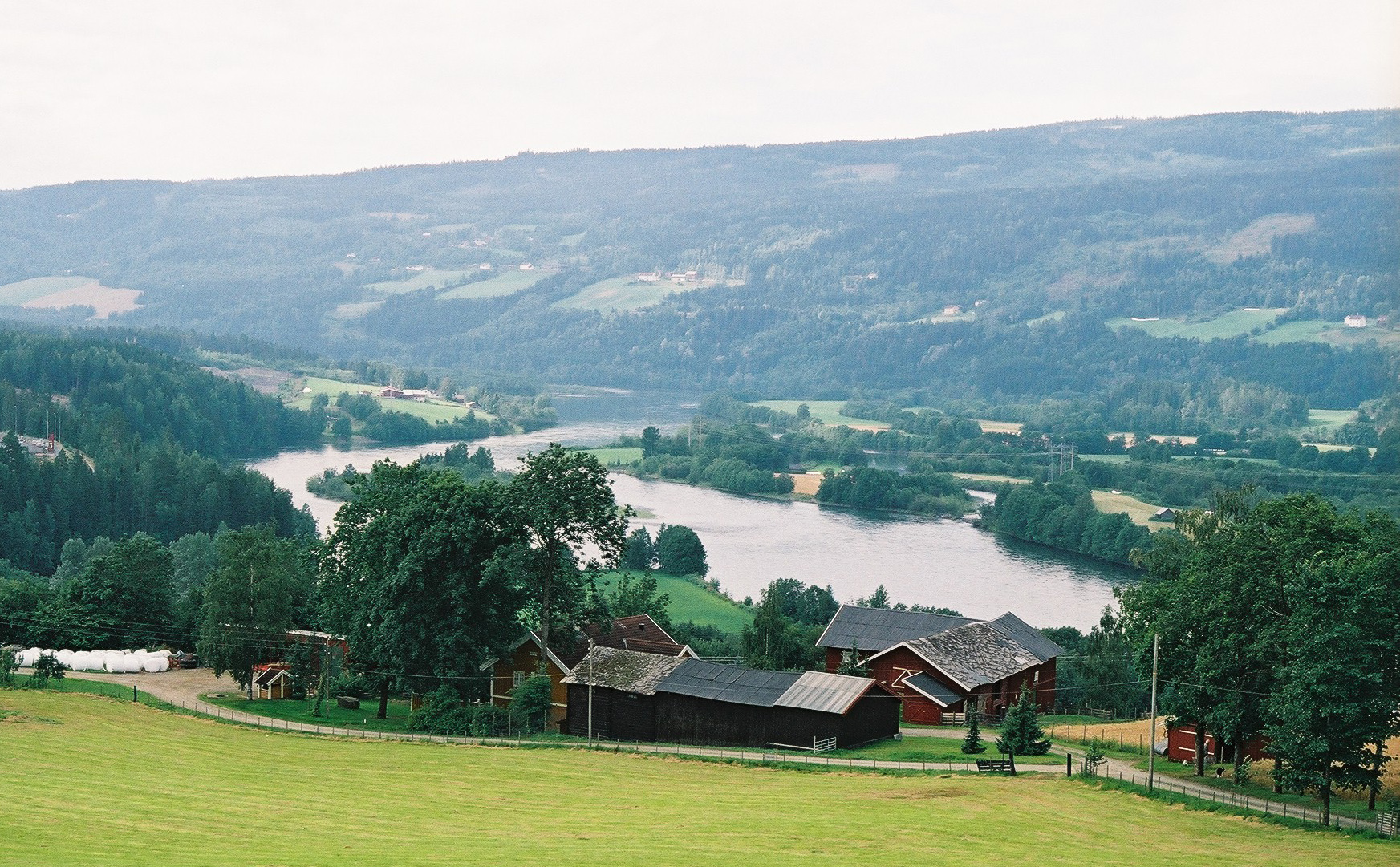
Gudbrandsdalslågen forms a delta where it flows into lake Mjøsa

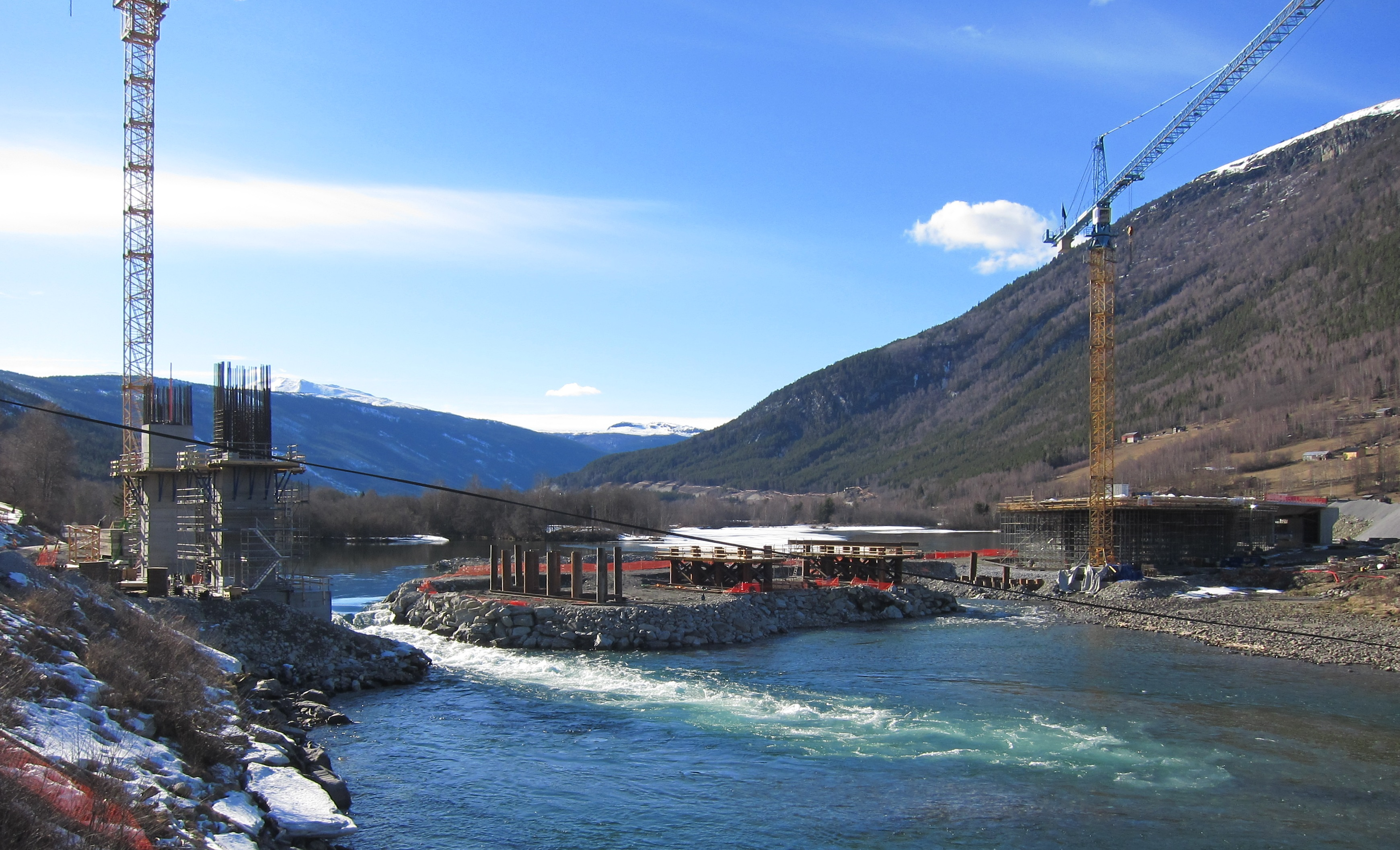
Lågen bridge on road E6 near Kvam under construction in 2015

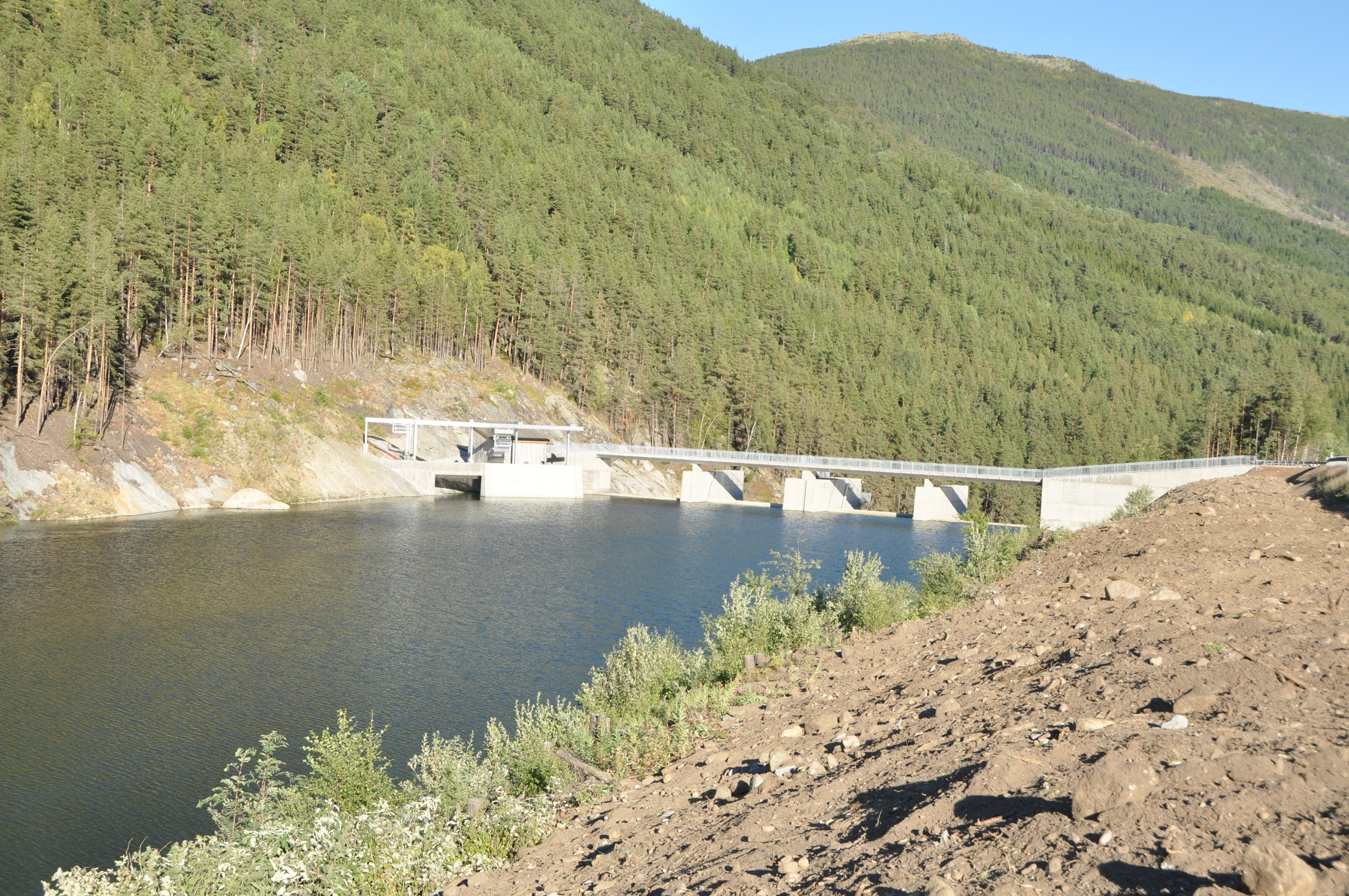
Rosten hydro power reservoir at the upper part of Lågen

== See also ==
- List of rivers of Norway
- Populated places on the Gudbrandsdalslågen river (category)

== Related reading ==
- Stagg, Frank Noel (1956). East Norway and its Frontier. London, UK: George Allen and Unvin, Ltd.
- Welle-Strand, Erling (1996). Adventure Roads in Norway. Nortrabooks. ISBN 9788290103717.
- Fullerton, Brian; Williams, Alan (1972). Scandinavia, An Introductory Geography. New York, USA: Praeger Publishers.
