= Losna (lake) =

Lake in Innlandet county, Norway

- Losnan
- Interactive map of the lake
- Location: Ringebu Municipality and Øyer Municipality, Innlandet
- Coordinates: 61°22′41″N 10°15′28″E
- Basin countries: Norway
- Max. length: 11.3 kilometres (7.0 mi)
- Max. width: 1.1 kilometres (0.68 mi)
- Surface area: 9.84 km^{2} (3.80 sq mi)
- Max. depth: 55 metres (180 ft)
- Surface elevation: 181 metres (594 ft)
- References: NVE

Losna is a lake situated within Ringebu Municipality and Øyer Municipality in Innlandet county, Norway. It forms part of the Gudbrandsdalslågen river, which, in this region, is so broad and runs so slowly that this stretch is recognized as a lake. The 9.84-square-kilometre (3.80 sq mi) lake has a length of 11 kilometres (6.8 mi) and it lies at an elevation of 181 metres (594 ft) above sea level. The maximum depth of the lake is 55 metres (180 ft). The European route E6 and the Dovrebanen railway line both run along the shores of the lake.

== See also ==
- List of lakes in Norway
