= Gudbrandsdalen =

- District
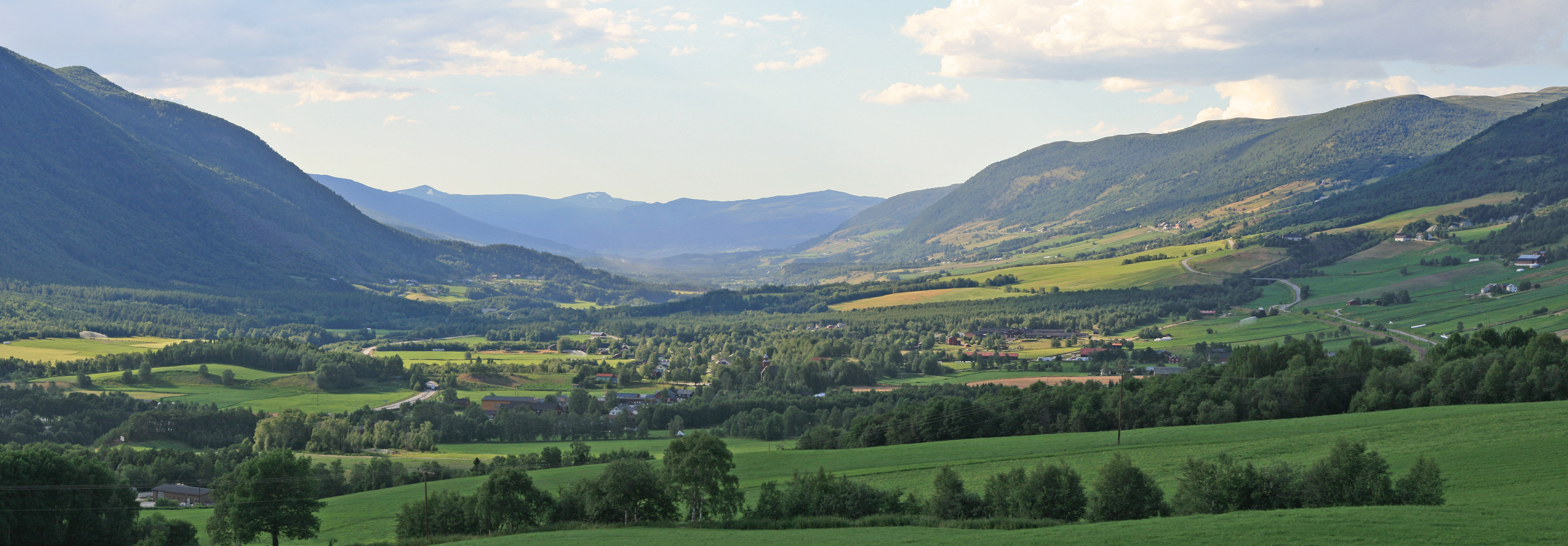
- Dovre Municipality, in the northern part of the valley

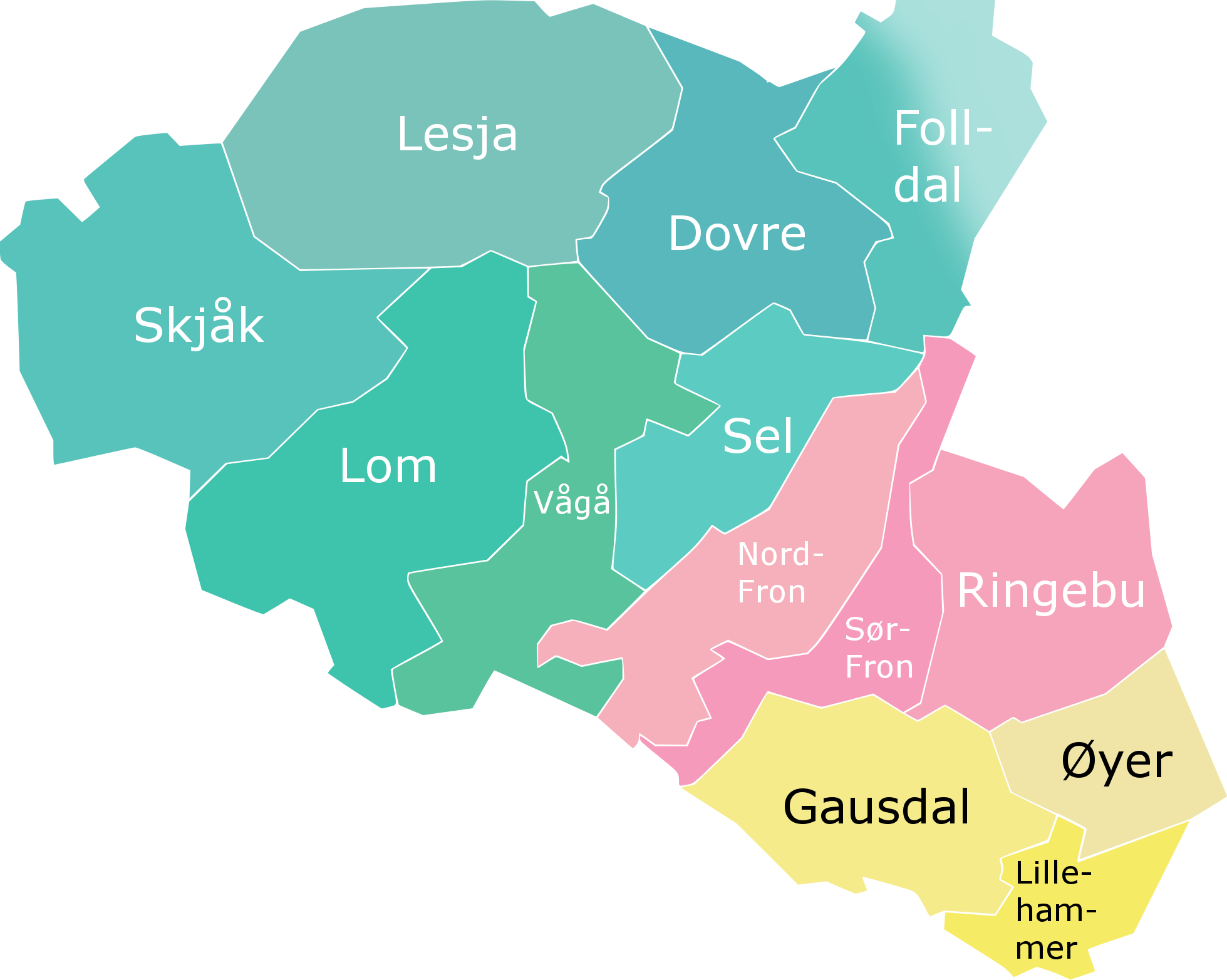
- Coordinates: 61°08′N 10°21′E
- Country: Norway
- County: Innlandet
- Region: Austlandet
- Urban center: Lillehammer

Area
  - Total: 15,340 km^{2} (5,920 sq mi)

Population (2016)
  - Total: 71,038
  - Density: 4.631/km^{2} (11.99/sq mi)
- Demonym: Gudbrandsdøl

Gudbrandsdalen (Urban East Norwegian: [ˈɡʉ̂dbrɑnsˌdɑːɫn̩] or Urban East Norwegian: [ˈɡʉ̂(d)brɑnsˌdɑːɳ]; English: Gudbrand Valley) is a valley and traditional district in the Norwegian county of Innlandet (formerly Oppland county). The valley is oriented in a north-westerly direction from Lillehammer and the lake of Mjøsa, extending 230 kilometers (140 mi) toward the Romsdalen valley. The river Gudbrandsdalslågen (Lågen) flows through the valley, starting from the lake Lesjaskogsvatnet and ending at the lake Mjøsa. The Otta river which flows through Otta valley is a major tributary to the main river Lågen. The valleys of the tributary rivers such as Otta and Gausa (Gausdal) are usually regarded as part of Gudbrandsdalen. The total area of the valley is calculated from the areas of the related municipalities. Gudbrandsdalen is the main valley in a web of smaller valleys. On the western (right hand) side there are long adjacent valleys: Ottadalen stretches 100 kilometers (62 mi) from Otta village, Gausdal some 50 kilometers (31 mi) from Lillehammer and Heidal some 40 kilometers (25 mi) from Sjoa. Gudbrandsdalen runs between the major mountain ranges of Norway including Jotunheimen and Dovrefjell–Rondane.

Together with the Glomma river and the Østerdalen valley, the river Lågen and the Gudbrandsdalen valley form Norway's largest drainage system covering major parts of Eastern Norway. Gudbrandsdalen is home to Dovre Line railway and the European route E6 highway. The valley is the main land transport corridor through Eastern Norway, from Oslo and central eastern lowlands to Trondheim and Møre og Romsdal.

The valley is divided into three parts:

- Norddalen (lit. 'the northern valley'): Lesja Municipality, Dovre Municipality, Skjåk Municipality, Lom Municipality, Vågå Municipality, and Sel Municipality
- Midtdalen (lit. 'the middle valley'): Nord-Fron Municipality, Sør-Fron Municipality, and Ringebu Municipality
- Sørdalen (lit. 'the southern valley'): Øyer Municipality, Gausdal Municipality, and Lillehammer Municipality.

The municipalities within the valley fall under the Gudbrandsdal District Court. Until 2016, the valley was also its own police district. The Gudbrandsdalen district covers about 60% of the former Oppland county.

The invention of the modern, firm, fatty variant of Brunost cheese is commonly attributed to the milkmaid Anne Hov from the rural valley.

The main character in Henrik Ibsen's play Peer Gynt was inspired by a real or legendary person living in the valley in the 18th or 17th century. Ibsen travelled through the valley in 1862 and collected local stories, legends and poems. Ibsen also made drawings from his trip, including "Elstad in Gudbrandsdalen".

== Etymology ==
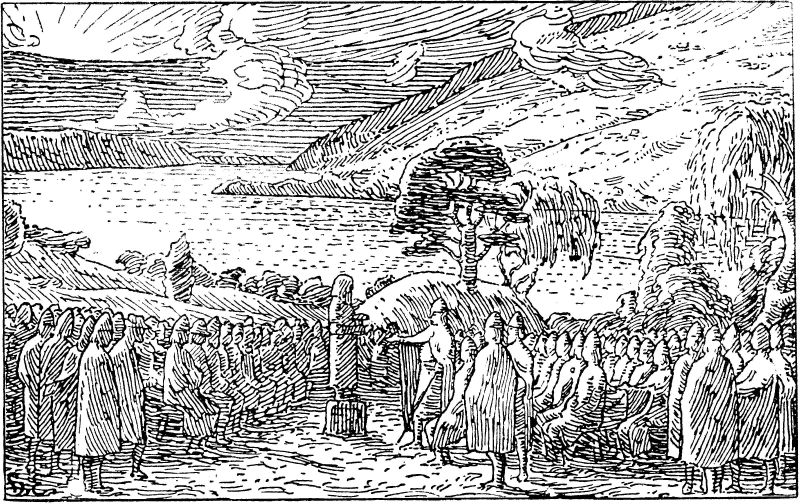
Depiction of King Olaf II speaking to peasants at the thing, Hundorp. Halfdan Egedius, 1899.

The name Gudbrandsdalen means 'the valley/dale of Gudbrand'. Gudbrand (Old Norse Guðbrandr) is an old male name compounded of guð, 'god' and brandr, 'sword'. The name may be derived from a chief (hersir) called Gudbrand. According Icelandic historian and poet Snorri Sturluson, the district was also referred to as i Dalom ("in the valleys") because of the many valleys. Dale-Gudbrand settled in Hundorp in the present-day Sør-Fron Municipality. At the time of Halfdan the Black there was a "chief Gudbrand north in Gubrandsdalen" (Gudbrand herse nord i Dalom). Later Eric Bloodaxe had an opponent called Dale-Gudbrand. According to the sage Olaf II of Norway met one Dale-Gudbrand, supposedly the last Dale-Gudbrand, in 1021. Historians believe there was a regional centre at Hundorp during the Viking era and that the name Gudbrand was used for many generations by the ruling family. Burial mounds (tumuli) at Hundorp suggest that powerful men are buried there.

== Geography ==
The Gudbrandsdalen valley includes the most arid area in Norway. In Skjåk Municipality the average annual precipitation is only 278 millimetres (10.9 in). The valley sits in the rain shadow of the mountains west (including Jotunheimen), north, and east of the valley. The valley is less incised than the valleys of western Norway. Farming is mostly confined to the relatively narrow areas along the rivers. Gudbrandsdalen and adjacent valleys are surrounded by wide uplands and mountain plateaus traditional used as seter or summer farms.

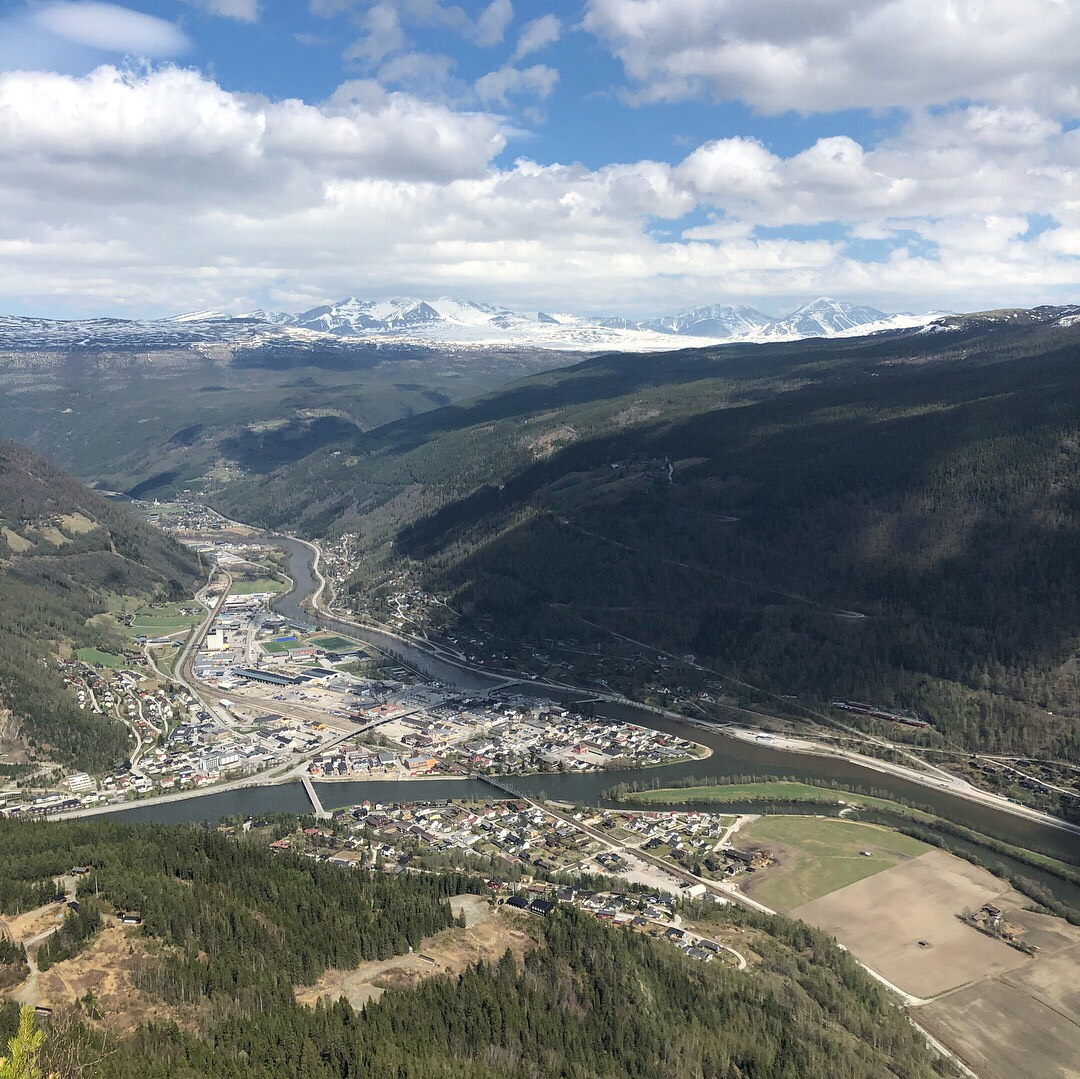
Otta town at the confluence of Otta and Lågen rivers, Rondane summits above.

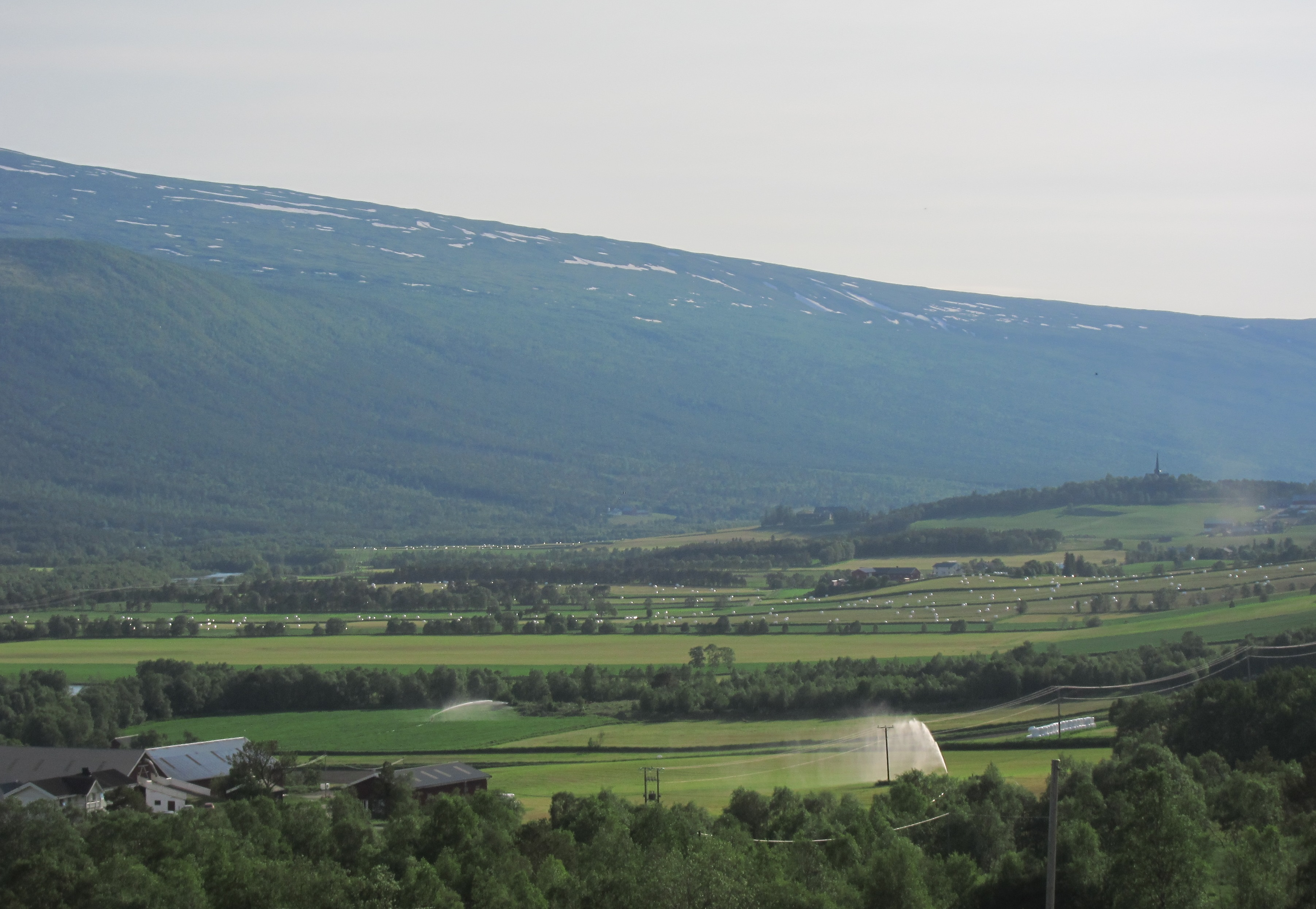
Patchwork farmland created by draining the shallow lake at Lesja Municipality east of the church.

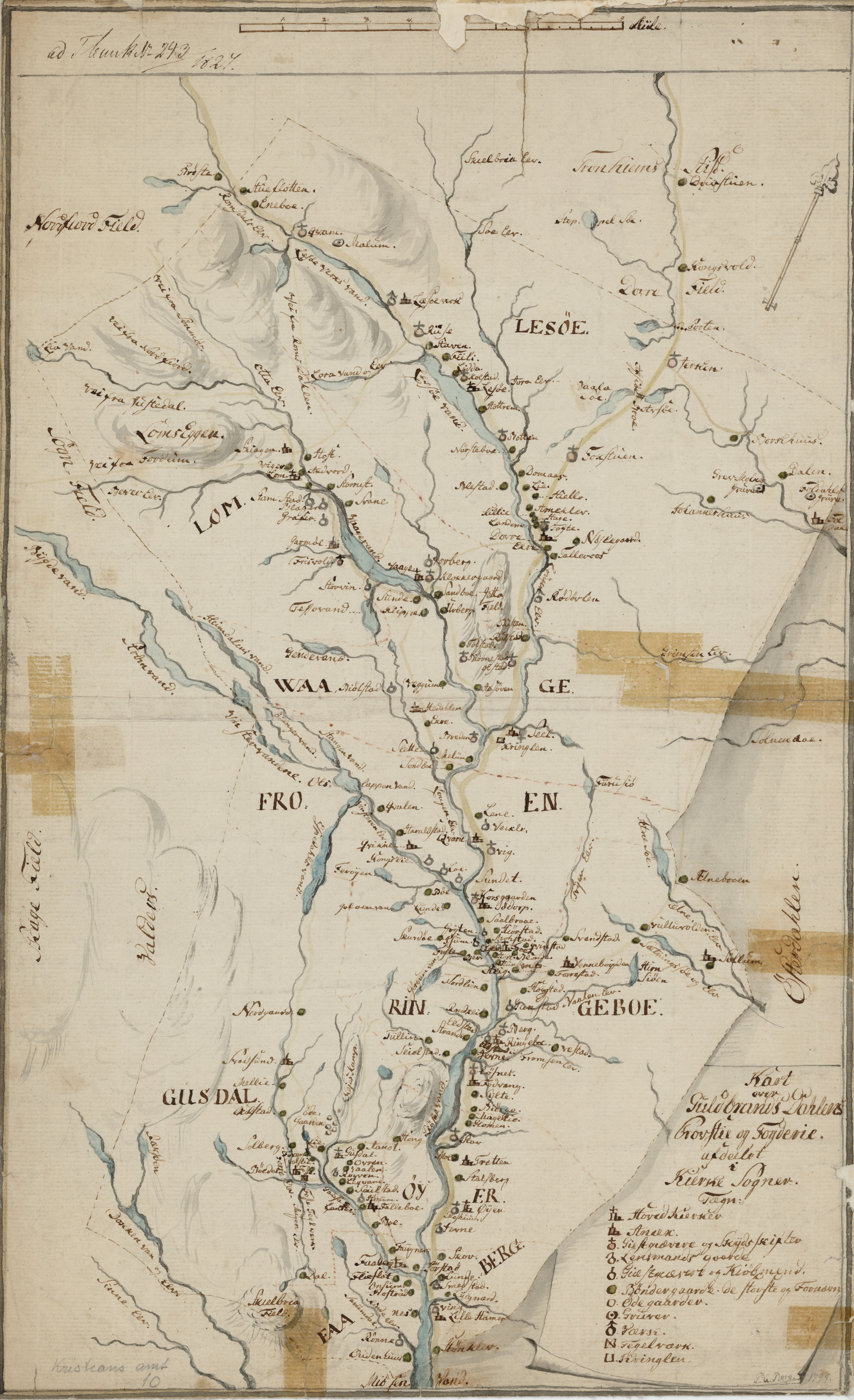
A 1799 hand-drawn map of the valley. The previous lake at Lesja visible.

In July 1789 the Storofsen flood disaster occurred and Gudbrandsdalslågen overflooded. This is the largest flood recorded in Norway and the valley was particularly affected. 61 people perished. About 3000 houses were totally damaged and some thousand livestock drowned. All bridges disappeared. Lågen rose up to 7 metres (23 ft) above its normal level and covered most of the valley floor. A number of farmers abandoned their damaged farms and settled in Målselv, Troms county. The second largest flood occurred in the summer of 1995 and again the valley floor was largely covered by water. After Storofsen the valley floor upstream from Sel Church changed into bogs and shallow lakes because stone and gravel changed the flow of Lågen. From around 1910 drainage efforts left some 500 hectares (1,200 acres) of dry farmland on what is still known as the Sel bogs. The toxic cicuta virosa thrived on those bogs before they were drained and are known in Norwegian as selsnepe (literally Sel turnip). The valley floor in Lesja Municipality (between Dombås and Lora) were originally covered by a shallow lake. Drainage efforts from 1860 abolished the lake and left some 1,000 hectares (2,500 acres) of farmland. The central part of the valley is covered by the Losna lake, some 50–60 metres (160–200 ft) deep.

== Geology ==
The valley of Gudbrandsdalen is of considerable antiquity considering the overall development of the relief of Norway. The valley runs across the height axis of the southern Scandinavian Mountains —a characteristic that could be indicating that the valley formed before the tectonic uplift of Norway. The valley is one of several valleys of southern Norway that existed already as part of the ancient Paleic relief but had at the time gentler slopes. Gudbrandsdalen formed and developed originally as a valley of fluvial origin. Only millions of year later was the valley re-shaped by glaciers during the Quaternary period. As the Fennoscandian Ice Sheet melted and retreated during the end of the last ice age a large but an ephemeral ice-dammed lake formed in the valley.

== History ==
The valley was shaped by the recent ice age and rivers from the present glacial areas in Jotunheimen and Dovre. Bones and teeth from mammoths and musk oxen, living in the area at that time, are found in the valley. Several traces of hunters from the Stone Age are found in the valley (and in the mountain areas around). There is a rock carving of moose in the northern part of Lillehammer Municipality. Gudbrandsdalen has always hosted the main road between Trondheim and the central eastern lowlands. In Old Norse known as þjóðvegr (tjodvei), "people's road" or "everybody's road".

=== Legendary history ===
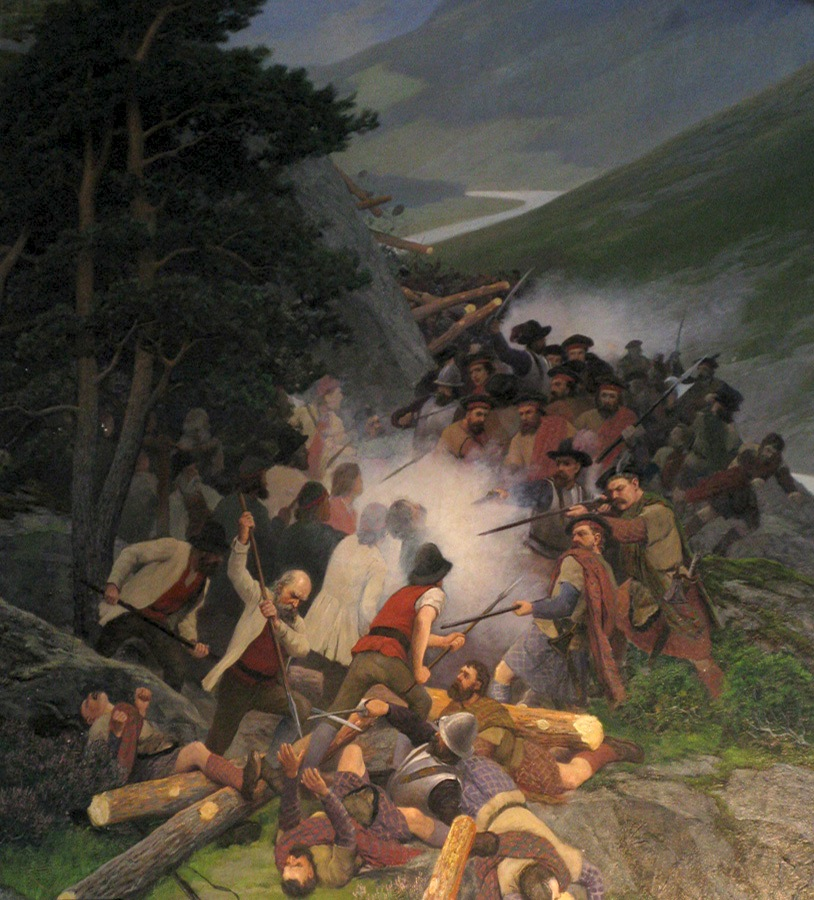
The Battle of Kringen, depicted by Georg Nielsen Strømdal (1856–1914)

Raum the Old was the father of Dale-Gudbrand, and he settled in Hundorp. The Gudbrand Valley is mentioned extensively in the Heimskringla (Chronicle of the Kings of Norway) by Snorri Sturluson. The account of King Olaf's (A.D. 1015–1021) conversion of Dale-Gudbrand to Christianity is popularly recognized. According to the saga Gudbrand built a church there "in the valleys", possibly at Haave farm near Hundorp where archaeological evidence indicates what may have been the first church in the valley. In 1206, the heir to the Norwegian throne, Håkon Håkonsson, was saved by birkebeiners with a ski-run from Lillehammer to Rena.

Until the Black Plague settlement expanded and new farms were established at outskirts. Farms with names -gard, -rud, -hus, and -li are mostly from this expansion period. During the High Middle Ages about 40 churches existed, most built in wood except for instances masonry churches in Eastern Gausdal and Follebu. Hamar episcopal see was established in 1152 and its jurisdiction included Gudbrandsdalen. Garmo Stave Church and Ringebu Stave Church are examples of ancient wooden churches. Fåvang Stave Church and Vågå Church include parts from older churches. The Black Plague reduced the population in Gudbrandsdal by 50 to 70% during 1349 to 1350. Saksum, Brekkom, Skåbo, Venabygd and other districts were left largely deserted for centuries. Inhabitants from marginal areas presumably relocated to the main valley and other areas with vacant land. A large number of clergy also perished during the plague and churches fell into disrepair. During the 1600s the population again reached the same level as in 1300. During the 1500s the area had about 6000 inhabitants. No census was taken before 1665 and population figures are based on estimates. This resulted in a temporary improvement for the lower classes as crofters became scarce and the poor were able to rent the better farms.

=== Older history ===
During the Reformation in 1537, the Church of Norway was subordinated to the lendmenn or sheriffs. Church property was appropriated by the Crown and the King became the biggest landowner in the valley. The Battle of Kringen took place in 1612, near Otta, Norway, and the local "Gudbrandsdøls" defeated a Scottish mercenary army. The legends of this battle live on to this day, including the story of how the peasant girl Prillar-Guri lured the Scots into an ambush by playing the traditional ram's horn. The 1665 census indicates a population of 13,000.

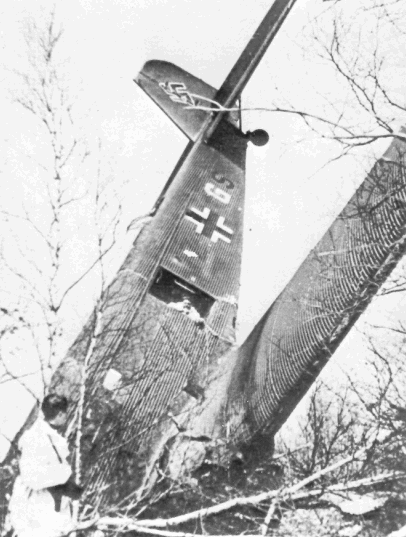
German Ju 52 shot down at Dombås, April 1940

In 1670 to 1725, most of the royal property was sold off to pay for war debts, first to established property holders, but increasingly to peasant proprietors. A freeholders' era began and a new "upper class" of landholders was formed. Storofsa happened in 1789, and is the greatest flood recorded in the Gudbrand Valley; several farms were devastated, and many people died.

=== Modern history ===
In 1827, the town of Lillehammer is established. The paddle steamer Skibladner on Mjøsa and Hovedbanen (the first railroad in Norway) connected the valley to the capital city, Christiania, in 1856. The Hamar-Selbanen railway was completed to Tretten in 1894. Hamar-Selbanen changed its name to the Dovre Line in 1921, and the new main railway between Oslo and Trondheim, was completed through the valley. The outdoor museum of Maihaugen, exhibiting historical architecture from all parts of the valley, opened at Lillehammer in 1904.

From around 1865 the population declined substantially because of emigration to North America. Until 1946 the majority of inhabitants worked in farming.

There was severe fighting in the valley at Tretten and Kvam, as well as in Dombås, during World War II. The Battle of Dombås was an attempt to stop the German advance. British troops engaged German troops in land battles for the first time in World War 2 after many months of Phoney War.

Lillehammer was the site of the Lillehammer affair in 1973, wherein operatives of the Israeli Mossad shot and killed a Moroccan waiter they mistakenly thought was Ali Hassan Salameh, who was involved in the Munich Massacre.

The 1994 Winter Olympics were celebrated at Lillehammer.

The 2016 Youth Olympics were celebrated at Lillehammer.

== Urban areas ==
- Lillehammer
- Valebru
- Otta

== Mountain areas close to the valley ==
- Jotunheimen
- Rondane
- Dovrefjell
- Reinheimen/Tafjordfjella
- Langsua

== See also ==
- Gudbrandsdalsost
- Gudbrandsdalsbunad
- Dølahest (Dole Gudbrandsdal)
- Dølafe
