= Lalm =

Village in Vågå Municipality, Norway

- Village
- Interactive map of Lalm
- Location within Innlandet Location within Norway
- Coordinates: 61.81777°N 9.27489°E
- Country: Norway
- Region: Eastern Norway
- County: Innlandet
- District: Gudbrandsdalen
- Municipality: Vågå Municipality

Area
  - Total: 0.35 km^{2} (0.14 sq mi)
- Elevation: 363 m (1,191 ft)

Population (2024)
  - Total: 328
  - Density: 937/km^{2} (2,430/sq mi)
- Time zone: UTC+01:00 (CET)
  - Summer (DST): UTC+02:00 (CEST)
- Post Code: 2682 Lalm

Lalm is a village in Vågå Municipality in Innlandet county, Norway. The village is located in the Ottadalen valley, at the southern end of the lake Lalmsvatnet, a lake on the Otta River. The 0.35-square-kilometre (86-acre) village has a population (2024) of 328 and a population density of 937 inhabitants per square kilometre (2,430/sq mi).

== Name ==
In the Middle Ages the place was known as Ladalm. The name is a reference to the fact that winter hay and feed for animals was stored there.

== History ==
From early in the Middle Ages Lalm was established as an early industrial center.

=== Millstone production ===
Written sources indicate that in the 15th century there was millstone production at Lalm, although it is possible the production dates back to the Viking era. From Kvennberget—which translates roughly to the mill-hill—millstones were delivered around Norway and even internationally. Kvennberget gained protected status as a cultural treasure in 1987.

Until 1640 Tolstad and Kvennberget were krongods. Anyone was free to produce as many millstones as they could as long as the land owner received every fourth millstone as payment. Starting in the 1830s this business was popular for farmers as winter work. The population increased greatly during this time and it was difficult for the population to subsist on farming.

The business in Kvennberget lasted until the end of the 1870s. After the Østerdalsbanen railroad was built, millstones from Selbu took over the millstone market in eastern Norway.

At the same time iron was produced from bog ore to supply tools for the millstone production. Near Melingen there are indications of iron production. Also in the area around Mela there was pottery production since the area has a good supply of clay.

=== Soapstone production ===
About a century ago the production of soapstone began at the farm Baarstad. Baarstad became a large employer for the surrounding area and the production lasted about a century until the soapstone supply was exhausted.

During the 1850s the roads in the district were improved and in 1896 the railroad was extended to Otta. This resulted in improved conditions for the soapstone business. In 1896 Norsk Kleber- og Skiferforretning was established and several other firms followed soon thereafter. The firms produced soapstone products as well as talcum. At the height of the activity in the business a steel mill was built by Østlandske Stenexport in the 1920s in Otta. The building was later converted to the Otta Dairy.

Gradually the soapstone production declined until it reached the current level. There is still limited production of soapstone for wood stoves and fireplaces. A/S Granit still produces wood stoves and fireplaces. The soapstone was until the fall of 1995 extracted mostly from Åsårberget, but the company is now extracting soapstone from both Bårstad and Nyseterberget.

=== Electricity production ===
On the southside of Ottaelva by the Eidefossen waterfall is A/S Eidefoss hydroelectric powerplant. The powerplant has produced electricity since 1917. The business was established in 1916 and the year after electricity production commenced. In 1920 a second generator was added and from then on the powerplant produced about 10 gigawatt-hours of electricity annually. The first electricity production was transmitted to a power line from Vågåmo to Otta. In 1983 a repowered plant began production after an investment of 72 million Norwegian kroner. Currently the Eidefossen powerplant produces 72 gigawatt-hours annually. The powerplant is owned jointly by the five neighboring counties: Lesja, Dovre, Sel, Vågå og Lom eier A/S Eidefoss. Each county owns 20% of the shares in the company.

== Culture ==
Lalm community center opened in 1958 and is a gathering point for the surrounding community. The center hosts cultural events and is the home of the local marching band Lalm Musikkforening and the local youth brass band Lalm Ungdomsbrass.

== Sports and recreation ==
Lalm athletic club was founded in 1936 and today has over 200 members. Lalm has an athletic center for football and track and field as well as a lit running and ski path and a small downhill ski area.

== Subareas ==
Lalm consists of the following areas according to Statistics Norway:

- Lalm og omegn (05150200)
  - Holongsøy/Rusten (05150201)
  - Lalm Solside (05150202)
  - Lalm tettsted-Ottadalen Solside (05150203)
  - Sjårdalen (05150204)
  - Lalm Bakside (05150205)
  - Ottadalen Bakside (05150206)

== Notable people ==
- Arne Barhaugen (Biathlon in Winter Olympics 1956)
- Håkon Brusveen (Olympic champion in 15 km at (Winter Olympics 1960)
- Marit Mikkelsplass (Winter Olympics 1988, Winter Olympics 1994, Winter Olympics 1998)
- Ivar Kleiven (Village historian who lived at Kleivsetra in Lalm)
