= Otha =

Otha is a given name and surname. Notable persons with that name include:

== Persons with the given name ==
- Otha Bailey (1931–2013), American baseball player
- Ellas Otha Bates or Bo Diddley (1928–2008), American singer, songwriter, guitarist, and producer
- Otha Turner (1907–2003), American musician
- Otha Wearin (1903–1990), American writer and politician
- Otha Young (1943–2009), American singer, songwriter, guitarist, and producer
- Otha Parrish iuka ms (1934 -2024) local quick stop owner believed to haunt the surrounding areas
- Otha Williams, American politician

== Persons with the family name ==
- Patrice Otha, Gabonese politician

== See also ==
- Dotha
- Othaya
- Othe
- Otho
- Otta (disambiguation)
- Utha
- Watha (disambiguation)
