= Otta =

Otta may refer to:

== People ==
- Said Mohamed Otta (born 1992), Egyptian professional footballer
- Walter Otta (born 1973), Argentine retired footballer
- Otta Bednářová (1927–2023), Czech journalist, writer, screenwriter, television producer and dissident
- Otta F Swire (1898–1973), Scottish author
- Otta Wenskus (born 1955), German classical philologist

== Places ==
- Otta, Norway, a town
  - Otta Station, a railway station
- Otta (river), Norway
- Otta, an alternate spelling of Ota, Ogun, a city in Ogun State, Nigeria

== Literature ==
- "Otta the Simple", also known as Hildisvini, Freya's lover in Norse mythology
- Ótta, a 2014 post-metal album by Sólstafir
- OttA, "On the Turning Away", a 1987 progressive rock song by Pink Floyd
- Otta (film), a 2023 Indian Malayalam-language film

== Other uses ==
- Otta (weapon), a curved stick used in the Indian martial art of Kalarippayattu
- Otta-, a preliminary name of the yotta- SI unit prefix

== See also ==
- Otta seal, a type of road surface invented Norway
- Ottadalen (English: Otta Valley) a valley in Innlandet county, Norway
- Ohta (disambiguation)
- Jüri Ottas (1885–1942), Estonian politician
- Auta (disambiguation)
