= Vesleofsen =

1995 flood in Norway

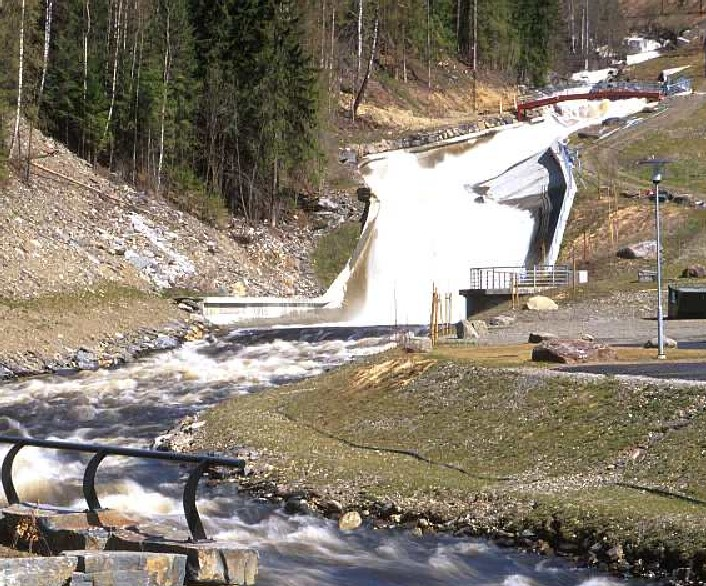
After the flood, the lower part of the Moksa River at Tretten was reinforced with concrete walls.

Vesleofsen is the name given to the extreme flood that hit Eastern Norway in June 1995. One man lost his life, 7,000 people were evacuated, and damages amounted to 1.8 billion Norwegian kroner. A total of 1,833 farms reported damage.

In Glomma, the flood peaked on June 2, in Gudbrandsdalslågen on June 3, and in Mjøsa on June 11. 3.5 million sandbags were used in Akershus, Hedmark, and Oppland to hold back the water. The flood was named after the previous major flood, Storofsen, in 1789. However, on the west side of North Gudbrandsdal, the flood in August/September 1938 caused more damage.

== Course of events ==
The Norwegian Water Resources and Energy Directorate (NVE) noticed unusually high snowfall early in the winter. In early May, warmer weather started the snowmelt as usual. On May 8, the Norwegian Meteorological Institute reported colder weather, and the next day, NVE issued a press release warning that a delay in snowmelt could lead to a large flood. Until May 22, temperatures remained below freezing in the mountains, and snowmelt was minimal. Temperatures then rose sharply in both mountain and forest areas, reaching highs of 15-20°C, accompanied by heavy rainfall from May 27 to June 2. NVE recorded 10-15 mm of rain daily in some parts of Eastern Norway. Several reservoirs were emptied to prepare for the anticipated water volume.

=== Glomma ===
At Elverum, the Glomma River exceeded its previous century-high water level from 31 May 1934. When the flood peaked at Stai on June 2, the river was 70 cm above the 1934 flood level and 61 cm below the Storofsen level. A flood marker indicating maximum flow levels is erected at the Norwegian Forest Museum.

The flood wave passed Kongsvinger on June 3, submerging most low-lying areas along Glomma. When it reached Rånåsfoss on June 5, the flow rate was nearly 1 m/s, with a discharge of 4,000 m³/s.

=== Trysilelva ===
The river exceeded the flood levels of 1927, 1934, and 1967, peaking on June 1 with a discharge of 760 m³/s at Nybergsund.

=== Gudbrandsdalslågen and Tributaries ===
The flood in the main river Lågen peaked on June 3.

=== Moksa River ===
In Gudbrandsdal, rivers on the eastern side were particularly affected. The Moksa River originates from Øyerfjellet and joins the Lågen from the east at Tretten. On June 2, after its flow reportedly increased 360 times above normal, the river burst its banks and created a new channel through the town center, causing several buildings to be washed away or severely damaged.

=== Rivers on the West Side ===
The largest inflow to the Lågen comes from the west. The Otta River alone covers over a third of Lågen’s total watershed. The Otta flood generally arrives later than the spring floods from the northern and eastern tributaries due to the high altitude of much of its watershed. The 1995 Otta flood is not marked on the flood post at Lalmsvatnet, but when the flood peaked, the water level was reported to be 10 cm below the 1938 mark, the highest since 1958.

=== Mjøsa ===
NVE decided to close one of the gates at Svanfossen to retain water until the flood peak from Glomma had passed the Vorma's outlet and reached Øyeren. From June 2, Mjøsa rose by about 2 cm per hour. Numerous flood barriers were built to protect the lowest-lying buildings. When the flood peaked on June 11, the water level was 7.94 meters at Hamar, lower than predicted but 20 cm higher than the 1967 flood. To prevent polluted floodwater from entering the Vikingskipet, it was filled with fresh water before Mjøsa reached the arena’s level.

== Sweden ==
Several Swedish watercourses experienced extreme flooding in 1995, following nearly the same weather pattern as Eastern Norway. Rivers with high-altitude watersheds peaked at the same time as Vesleofsen – including the major flood in Klarälven (continuation of Trysilelva), which flows into Vänern at Karlstad.

== Measures after the flood ==
In July 1995, the Flood Measures Committee was appointed to investigate ways to make society more resilient to flooding. Their report was published the following year. Following recommendations from the report, NVE began creating flood zone maps, which are actively used in municipal land-use planning. Flood barriers were also constructed around Lillestrøm, completed in 2003.
