= Lalmsvatnet =

Lake in Innlandet, Norway

- Interactive map of the lake
- Location: Vågå Municipality, Innlandet
- Coordinates: 61°51′37″N 9°12′51″E
- Basin countries: Norway
- Max. length: 6 kilometres (3.7 mi)
- Max. width: 800 metres (2,600 ft)
- Surface area: 2.1593 km^{2} (0.8337 sq mi)
- Shore length^{1}: 20.58 kilometres (12.79 mi)
- Surface elevation: 355 metres (1,165 ft)
- References: NVE
- ^{1} Shore length is not a well-defined measure.

Lalmsvatnet is a lake in Vågå Municipality in Innlandet county, Norway. The 2.16-square-kilometre (0.83 sq mi) lake is a part of the Otta river between the villages of Vågåmo and Lalm in the Ottadalen valley. The Norwegian National Road 15 runs along the north shore of the lake.

== See also ==
- List of lakes in Norway
