= Billingsdal =

Valley in Skjåk, Norway

Billingsdalen
- Billingsdal
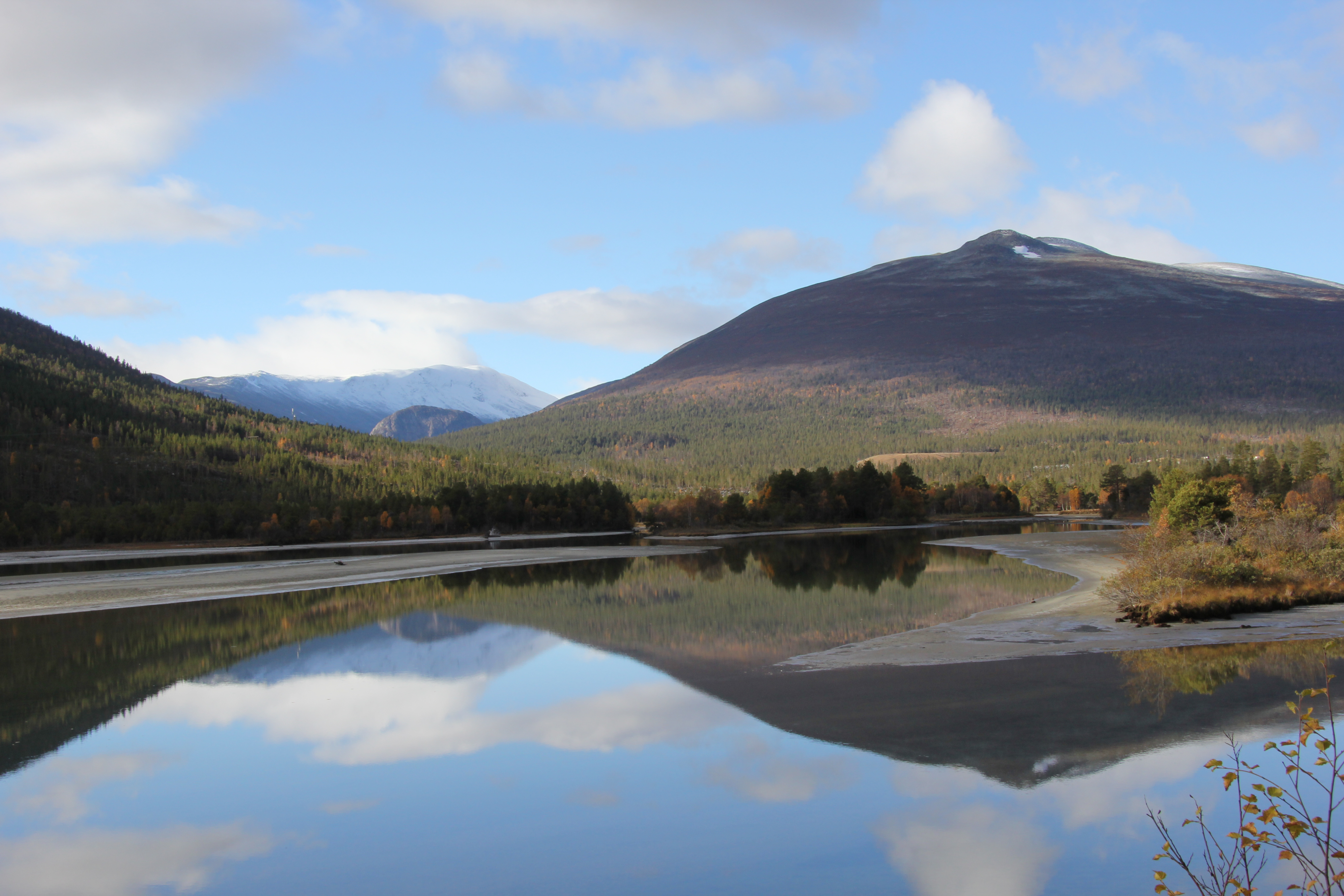
- View of the valley
- Long-axis direction: E-W

Geology
- Type: River valley

Geography
- Location: Innlandet, Norway
- Coordinates: 61.96033°N 7.91578°E

Location
- Interactive map of the valley

Billingsdal or Billingsdalen is a river valley in Skjåk Municipality in Innlandet county, Norway. The valley is the inner part of the larger Ottadalen valley which is the valley through which the river Otta flows. It is considered a lateral valley that runs off of the main Gudbrandsdalen valley which dominates this part of Norway.

For many centuries this valley was used as a transportation route. People would head west from the village of Lom and go up through the Billingsdalen valley, through the Strynefjellet mountains, and then down to Nordfjord and Sunnmøre on the west coast of Norway. The village of Grotli lies at a junction of two of these old roads. The Old Strynefjell road is now County road 258 (Fv258) and it heads southwest from Grotli over the Strynefjell mountains. Another old road heads northwest from Grotli and leads over other mountains to Geiranger. Today, a new Norwegian National Road 15 (Riksvei 15) takes another path through the mountains from Stryn and heads eastward through the Billingsdalen valley.
