= Øygard =

Øygard may refer to:

- IL Øygard, forerunner of Sotra SK, a sports club in Hordaland, Norway
- Olav Øygard (born 1956), Lutheran bishop in Norway
- Rune Øygard (born 1959), Norwegian politician convicted of child sexual abuse
- Svein Harald Øygard (born 1960), Norwegian economist
