= Stai (disambiguation) =

Stai is a Norwegian surname.

Stai or STAI may also refer to:

- State-Trait Anxiety Inventory
- Stai, Innlandet village and a railway station in the Innlandet county, Norway
- Stai, Smolensk Oblast, village in Smolensk Oblast, Russia
- Stai, Lyepyel District, agrotown in Belarus
