= Lemonsjøen =

Lake in Innlandet, Norway

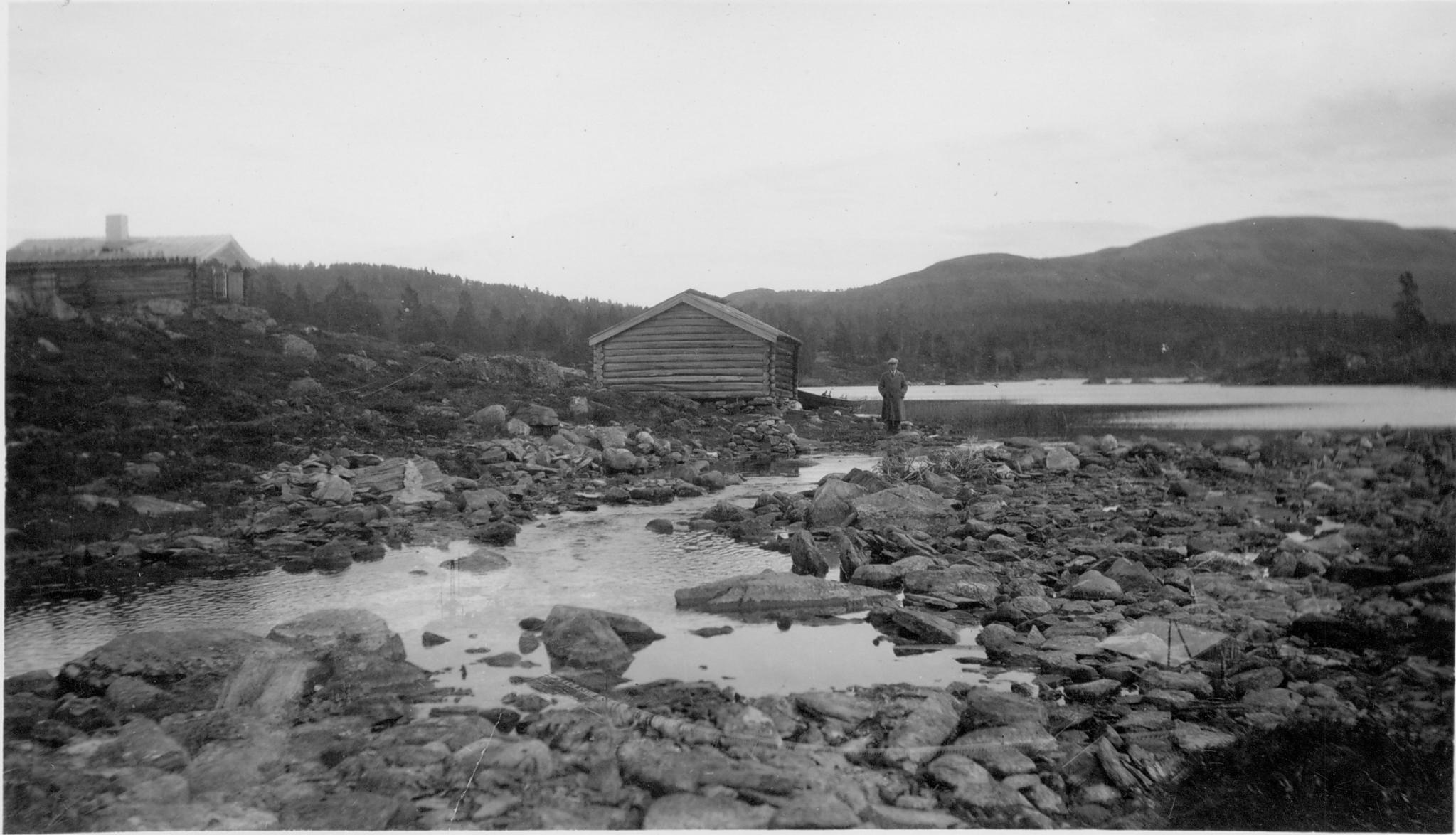
- View of the main outlet of the lake in 1930. Credit: NVE
- Interactive map of the lake
- Location: Vågå Municipality, Innlandet
- Coordinates: 61°46′39″N 9°4′12″E
- Basin countries: Norway
- Max. length: 4 kilometres (2.5 mi)
- Max. width: 1.5 kilometres (0.93 mi)
- Surface area: 3.6395 km^{2} (1.4052 sq mi)
- Shore length^{1}: 12.25 kilometres (7.61 mi)
- Surface elevation: 862 metres (2,828 ft)
- References: NVE
- ^{1} Shore length is not a well-defined measure.

Lemonsjøen is a lake in Vågå Municipality in Innlandet county, Norway. It is located on the eastern edge of the Jotunheimen mountain range. The 3.6-square-kilometre (1.4 sq mi) lake lies about 10 kilometres (6.2 mi) south of the village of Vågåmo. The larger lake Tesse lies about 5 kilometres (3.1 mi) west of this lake and the lake Flatningen lies about 4 kilometres (2.5 mi) to the northeast.

== See also ==
- List of lakes in Norway
