= Flatningen =

Lake in Innlandet, Norway

- Interactive map of the lake
- Location: Vågå Municipality, Innlandet
- Coordinates: 61°47′59″N 9°7′43″E
- Basin countries: Norway
- Max. length: 3.8 kilometres (2.4 mi)
- Max. width: 800 metres (2,600 ft)
- Surface area: 2.35 km^{2} (0.91 sq mi)
- Shore length^{1}: 10.24 kilometres (6.36 mi)
- Surface elevation: 776 metres (2,546 ft)
- References: NVE
- ^{1} Shore length is not a well-defined measure.

Flatningen is a lake in Vågå Municipality in Innlandet county, Norway. It is located on the far eastern edge of the Jotunheimen mountain range. The 2.35-square-kilometre (0.91 sq mi) lake lies about 8 kilometres (5.0 mi) south of the village of Vågåmo and about 9 kilometres (5.6 mi) west of the village of Lalm. The lake Lemonsjøen lies about 4 kilometres (2.5 mi) to the southwest of this lake.

== See also ==
- List of lakes in Norway
