= Tessand =

Village in Vågå Municipality, Norway

- Village
- Interactive map of Tessand
- Location within Innlandet Location within Norway
- Coordinates: 61.84797°N 8.96267°E
- Country: Norway
- Region: Eastern Norway
- County: Innlandet
- District: Gudbrandsdal
- Municipality: Vågå Municipality
- Elevation: 368 m (1,207 ft)
- Time zone: UTC+01:00 (CET)
  - Summer (DST): UTC+02:00 (CEST)
- Post Code: 2683 Tessanden

Tessand is a village in Vågå Municipality in Innlandet county, Norway. The village is located on the south shore of the lake Vågåvatnet at the intersection of Norwegian National Road 15 and Norwegian County Road 51, about 9 kilometres (5.6 mi) to the southwest of the village of Vågåmo.

== History ==
In 1973, A. Krogsrud discovered a tusk from a mammoth in the area around Tessand. The tusk is now at the Natural History Museum at the University of Oslo.
