= Djupvatnet =

Lake in Stranda, Møre og Romsdal, Norway

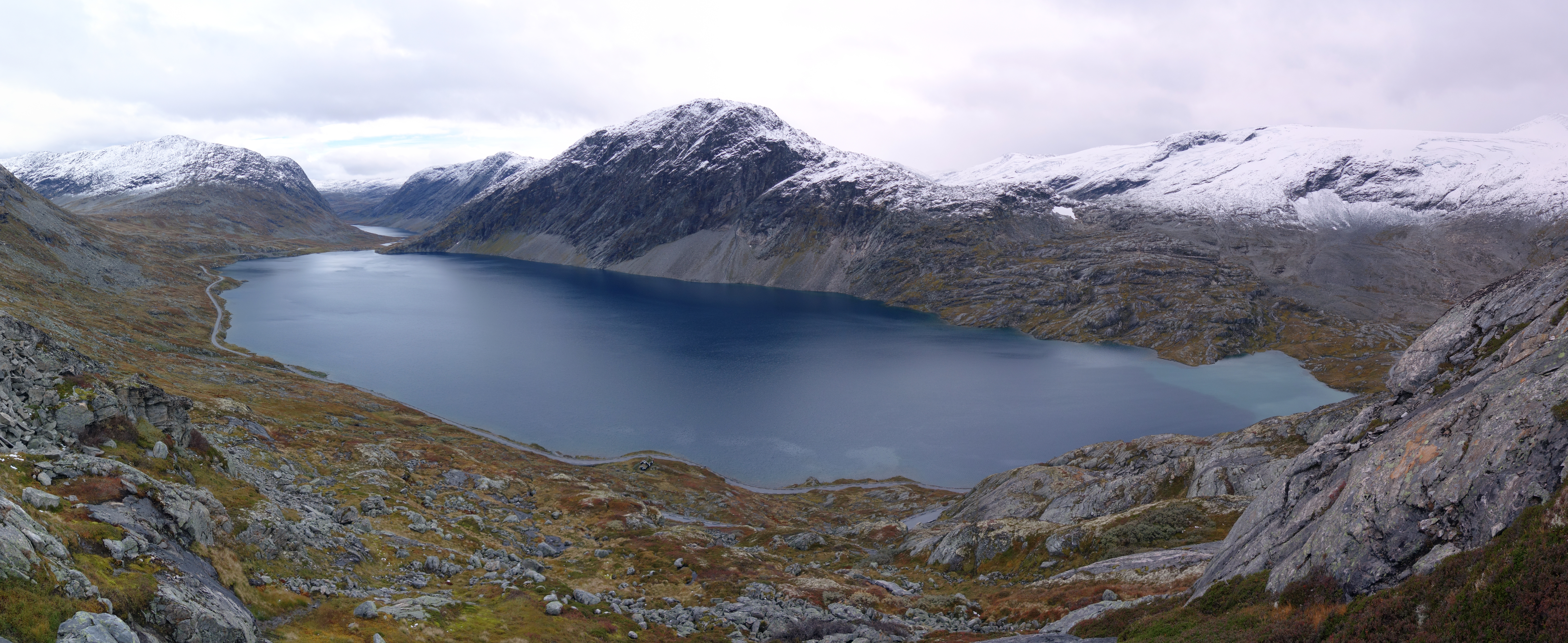
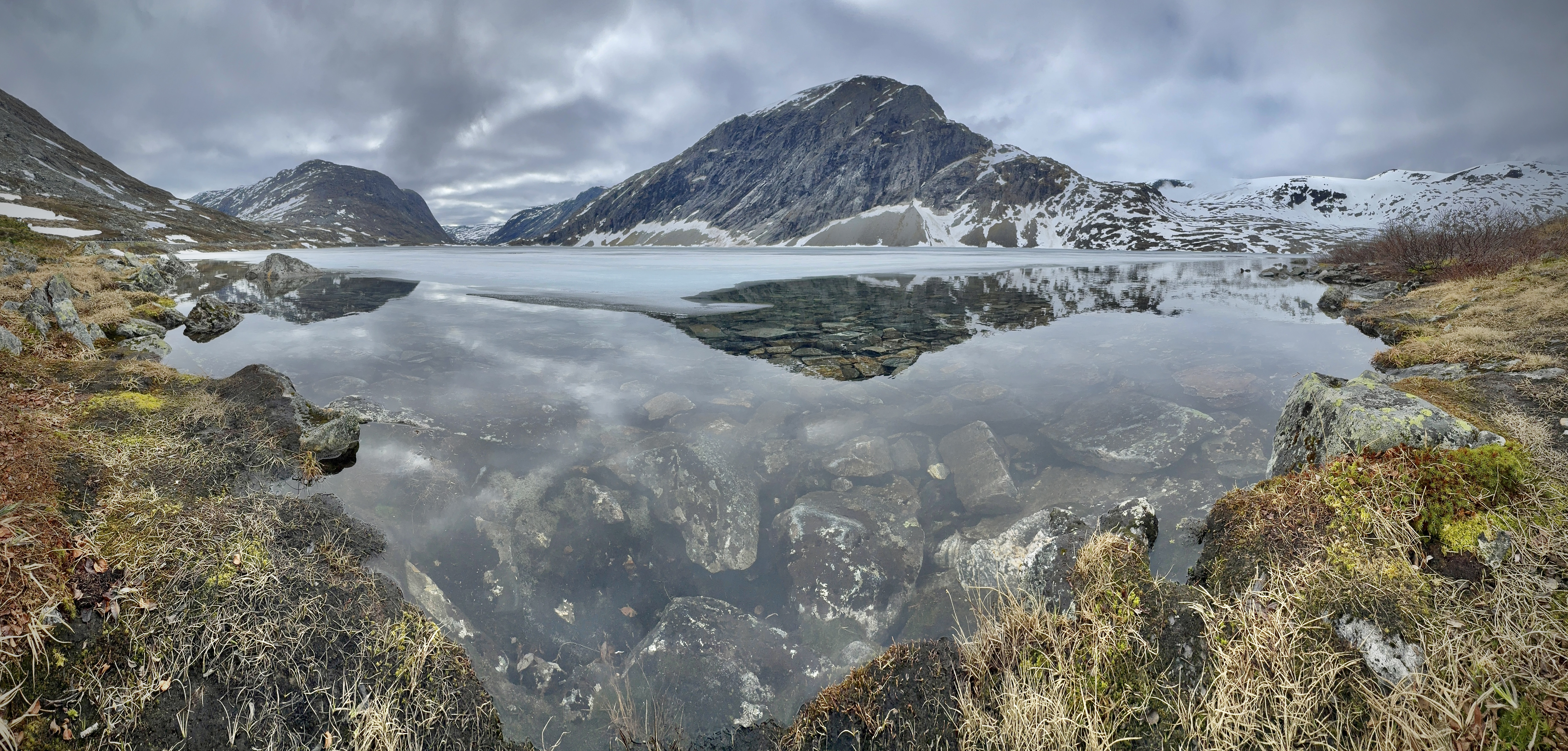
- View of Djupvatnet Djupvatnet Lake in Møre og Romsdal county.
- Interactive map of the lake
- Location: Stranda Municipality, Møre og Romsdal
- Coordinates: 62.0240°N 7.3048°E
- Catchment area: Otta
- Basin countries: Norway
- Max. length: 2.4 kilometres (1.5 mi)
- Max. width: 1.1 kilometres (0.68 mi)
- Surface area: 2 km^{2} (0.77 sq mi)
- Max. depth: 200 m (660 ft)
- Surface elevation: 1,016 metres (3,333 ft)
- References: NVE

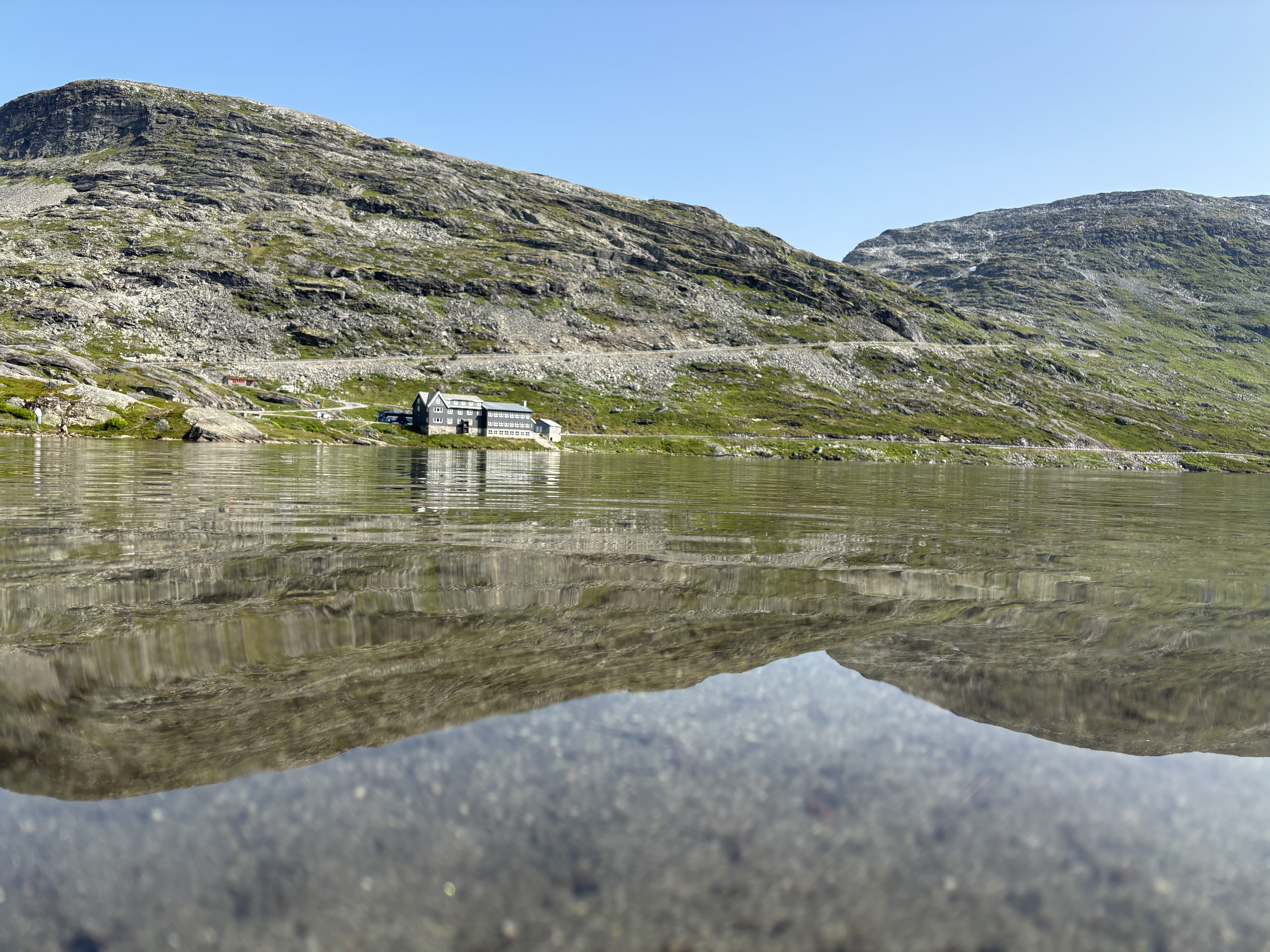
Djupvatnet view from the beach

Djupvatnet is a lake in extreme southeastern Stranda Municipality in Møre og Romsdal county, Norway. The 2-square-kilometre (0.77 sq mi) lake lies at 1,016 metres (3,333 ft) above sea level. The lake is part of the headwaters of the Otta river system which flows southeast into the lake Breiddalsvatnet and on into Innlandet county.

Norwegian County Road 63 follows the northern shore of the lake. The tourist village of Geiranger and the Geirangerfjorden are located about 12 kilometres (7.5 mi) to the north of the lake. The mountain Dalsnibba is located immediately northwest of the lake, and there is a road leading to the top that begins on the northwest side of the lake.

== See also ==
- List of lakes in Norway
