= Ivar P. Enge =

Norwegian radiologist (1922–2013)

Ivar Paul Enge (12 September 1922 – 18 July 2013) was a Norwegian radiologist.

He hailed from Vågå Municipality and took the cand.med. degree in Copenhagen in 1953 and the dr.med. degree in 1977. He was stationed at hospitals like Sauda Hospital, Ullevål Hospital, the University of Virginia Hospital, and Rikshospitalet. From 1978 to 1991 he was director of the x-ray department at Aker Hospital and professor of radiology at the University of Oslo Faculty of Medicine.

He was one of Norway's foremost radiologists, specializing in interventional radiology. He was decorated as a Knight, First Class of the Order of St. Olav in 1991. He resided in Lillehammer Municipality. He died in July 2013.
