= Auta =

Auta may refer to:

- Auta de Souza (1876–1901), Brazilian poet
- Lois Auta (born 1980), Nigerian disability rights activist
- Auta Magetta, a Dragonball character
- Avuta (Russian: Auta), a river in Belarus
- Battle of Głębokie (initially called the bitwa nad Autą [Battle of Auda] in Polish historiography), a 1920 Polish–Soviet War battle fought near the river
- Saint Auta, a companion of the 4th-century Saint Ursula

== See also ==
- Otta (disambiguation)
