= Besstrond =

Village in Vågå Municipality, Norway

- Village
- Interactive map of Besstrond
- Location within Innlandet Location within Norway
- Coordinates: 61.54935°N 8.91296°E
- Country: Norway
- Region: Eastern Norway
- County: Innlandet
- District: Gudbrandsdal
- Municipality: Vågå Municipality
- Elevation: 992 m (3,255 ft)
- Time zone: UTC+01:00 (CET)
  - Summer (DST): UTC+02:00 (CEST)
- Post Code: 2683 Tessanden

Besstrond is a small village area in Vågå Municipality in Innlandet county, Norway. The village is located on a hillside between the lakes Nedre Sjodalsvatnet and Øvre Sjodalsvatnet. The village lies in the Sjodalen valley, along the Norwegian County Road 51, just outside the boundaries of Jotunheimen National Park, about 45 kilometres (28 mi) south of the village of Vågåmo.
