= Halvard Grude Forfang =

Norwegian educator

Halvard Grude Forfang (24 December 1914 – 6 July 1987) was a Norwegian educator.

He was born in Bærum as a son of chemical engineer Einar Forfang (1881–1950) and Agnes Grude (1885–1958). He was a nephew of Karen Grude Koht. His home environment was marked by the norskdom movement; his family was a member of Noregs Mållag.

He finished his secondary education at Stabekk Municipal Higher Education School in 1934, and took the cand.philol. degree at the University of Oslo in 1941. He worked as a teacher in Hartmann's boarding school in Asker and Lillehammer Municipal Higher Education School.

Later he started to work in the Nansen Academy from 1946 to 1971. He was responsible with rebuilding the school, which was closed during the German occupation of Norway. After stepping down as rector he continued as a teacher, finally retiring in 1981.

His books include a two-volumes history on the Nansen Academy, released in 1977 and 1982, and a 1945 biography about Ivar Kleiven, which was originally his master's thesis. He died in July 1987 in Lillehammer.

== Works ==
- Ivar Kleiven 1854-1934, 1945
- In the spirit of Nansen, in The Norseman No. 4/1963
- Nansen School 1936-1940. Two friends' dream and deed, 1977
- Nansen School 1946-1971, 1982
- Voltaire in Vågå, 1982
- Paul Botten Hansen and the Dutch circle. Literated and book collector in a national cave. A left manuscript, Lillehammer 1990
