= Ivar Kleiven =

Norwegian politician, historian and poet

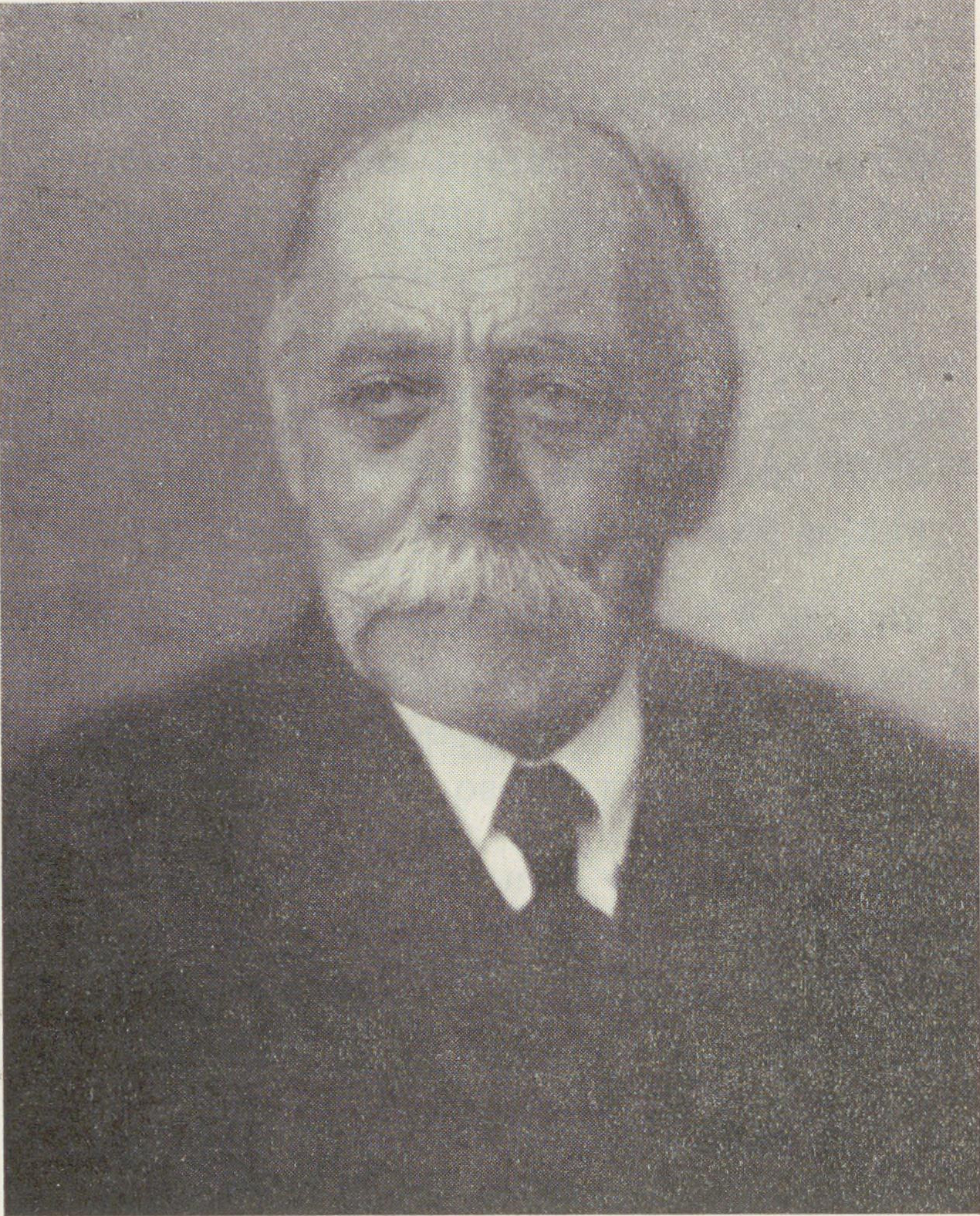
- Born: July 10, 1854; Vågå, Oppland, Norway
- Died: February 19, 1934 (aged 79)
- Occupations: Politician, historian, poet

Ivar Kleiven (10 July 1854 – 19 February 1934) was a Norwegian politician, historian and poet. He is most remembered as a collector of local folklore.

== Background ==
Ivar Jakobsson Kleven was born in Vaage Municipality (now spelled Vågå) in Christians amt (county) in Norway. Kleven grew up on the small farm Kleven (Søre Kleivi) in Ottadalen. His parents were Jacob Ivarsson Snerle (later Kleven) (1803–1884) and Brit Knutsdotter Svarvarhaugen (1824–1916). Kleven attended one year at Seljord Folkehøgskule (1885–1886), when Viggo Ullmann was the headmaster. Kleven joined the local council board where he served from 1888 to 1905. From 1892, he served as chairman of the school board and from 1900 to 1903 he was a deputy to the Parliament of Norway from the Norwegian Liberal Party.

== Career ==
His writing often reflects the nationalistic mood of the time. He has been called the Snorri Sturlason of Gudbrandsdal. Ivar Kleven lived through the many changes that eventually would come to transform the rural communities. It was the folk tradition from his home community that was the subject of his first book, Segner from Vågå (1894). From 1909 he received state support for cultural and historical works. Gamal bondekultur i Gudbrandsdalen, his main work in the stylish and expressive Gudbrandsdal dialect, concerned the old peasant culture in Lillehammer: Lom and Skjåk (1915), Lesja og Dovre (1923), Østre og Vestre Gausdal (1926), Ringebu (1928) and Fronsbygdin (1930). An extensive collection of his work and correspondence can be found at the Norddalsarkivet in Vågå.

== Selected works ==
- I gamle Daagaa. Forteljingo og Bygda-Minne fraa Vaagaa (1908)
- I Heimegrendi. Minne fraa Seksti-Aarom (1908)
- Frå skotteåre (1935)
- Elvesøg (1937)

== Other sources ==
- Forfang, H. G. Ivar Kleiven 1854–1934 (1945)
- Svare, O. Ivar Kleiven (1934)
- Bjørkvik, Halvard : Ivar Kleiven (in Norsk biografisk leksikon
