= Vågåvatnet =

Lake in Innlandet, Norway

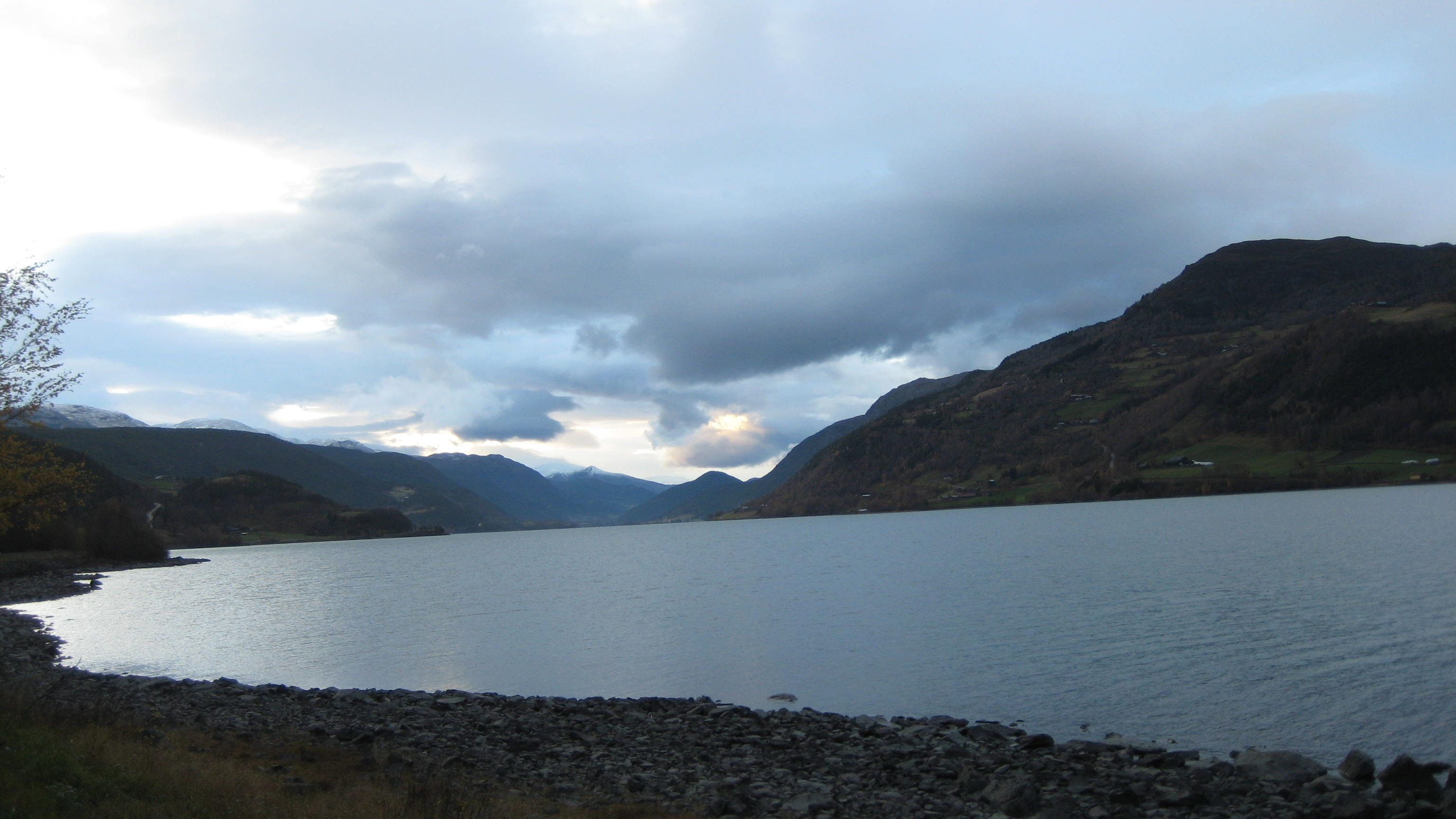
- Interactive map of the lake
- Location: Lom and Vågå, Innlandet
- Coordinates: 61.85119°N 8.85278°E
- Primary inflows: Otta
- Primary outflows: Otta
- Basin countries: Norway
- Max. length: 28.5 kilometres (17.7 mi)
- Max. width: 1.1 kilometres (0.68 mi)
- Surface area: 14.76 km^{2} (5.70 sq mi)
- Max. depth: 82 metres (269 ft)
- Surface elevation: 362 metres (1,188 ft)
- References: NVE

Vågåvatnet is a lake located in Lom Municipality and Vågå Municipality in Innlandet county, Norway. The lake is part of the river Otta, which begins in Skjåk Municipality, flows into lake Vågåvatn. It then exits the Vågåvatn at the village of Vågåmo and continues its journey through the Ottadalen valley before leaving Vågå Municipality to meet the Gudbrandsdalslågen river at the town of Otta in Sel Municipality.

The 14.76-square-kilometre (5.70 sq mi) lake sits at an elevation of 362 metres (1,188 ft) above sea level. The lake is one of the 200 largest lakes in Norway.

== See also ==
- List of lakes in Norway
