= Patrice Otha =

Gabonese politician

Patrice Otha is a Gabonese political figure who has been Director of the Cabinet of the President of Gabon since 2010.

While serving as President of the Gabon Section of the Initiative for Transparency in Extractive Industries, Otha was appointed as Director of the Cabinet of President Ali Bongo on 28 January 2010. His appointment followed the resignation of his predecessor, Jean-Pierre Oyiba, amidst a scandal in November 2009.
