= Vågå Municipality =

Municipality in Innlandet, Norway

Vågå Municipality Vågå kommune
- Municipality
- Vaagaa herred (historic name); Vaage herred (historic name)
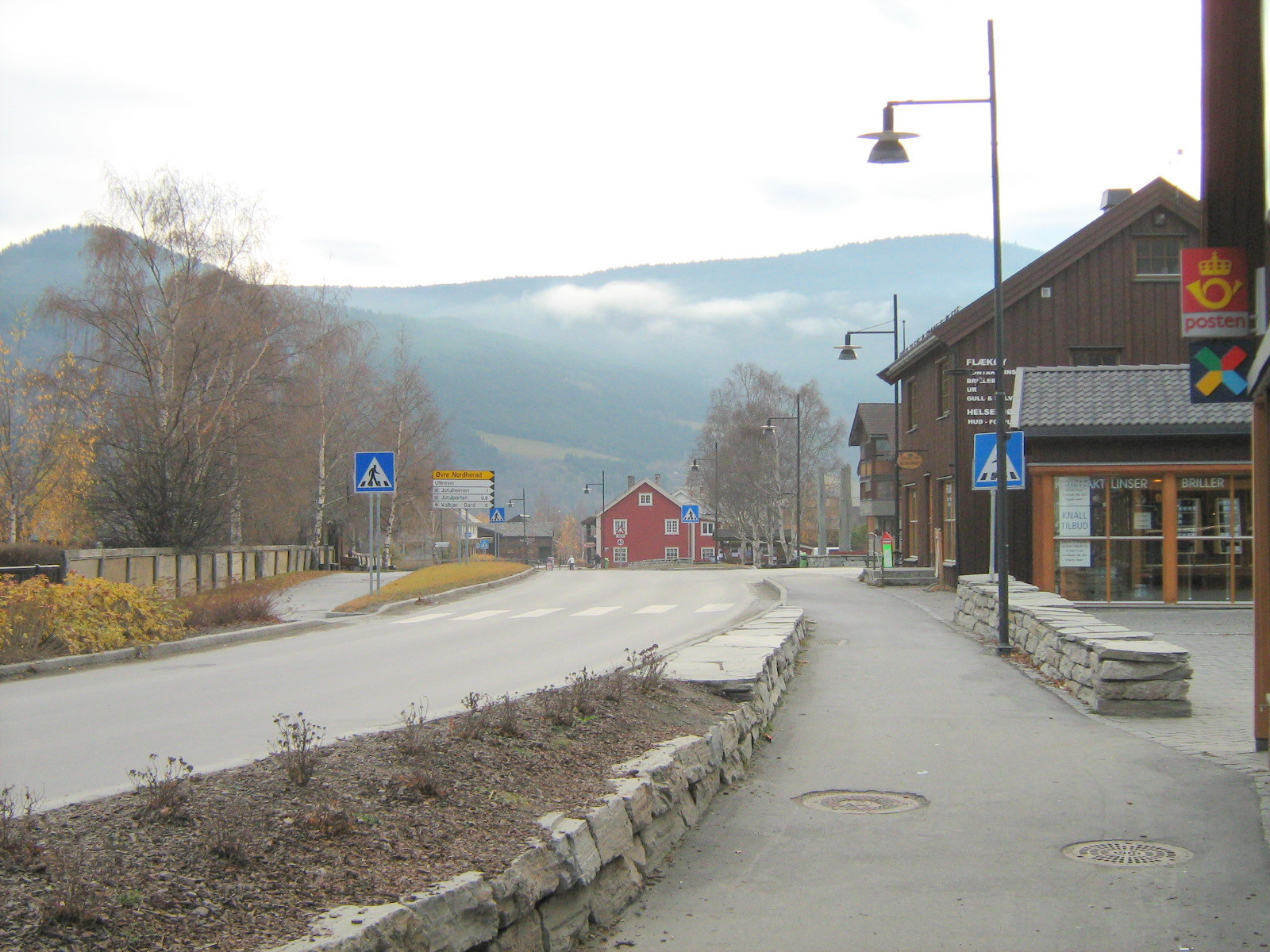

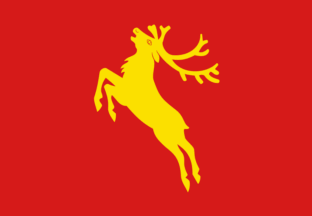
- Flag Coat of arms

- Innlandet within Norway

- Vågå within Innlandet
- Coordinates: 61°50′55″N 9°7′16″E
- Country: Norway
- County: Innlandet
- District: Gudbrandsdal
- Established: 1 Jan 1838
  - Created as: Formannskapsdistrikt
- Administrative centre: Vågåmo

Government
  - Mayor (2019): Harald Sve Bjørndal (BL)

Area
  - Total: 1,329.99 km^{2} (513.51 sq mi)
  - Land: 1,251.95 km^{2} (483.38 sq mi)
  - Water: 78.04 km^{2} (30.13 sq mi) 5.9%
  - Rank: #73 in Norway
- Highest elevation: 2,367.64 m (7,767.8 ft)

Population (2025)
  - Total: 3,529
  - Rank: #217 in Norway
  - Density: 2.7/km^{2} (7.0/sq mi)
  - Change (10 years): ▼ −4.2%
- Demonym: Vagvær

Official language
  - Norwegian form: Nynorsk
- Time zone: UTC+01:00 (CET)
  - Summer (DST): UTC+02:00 (CEST)
- ISO 3166 code: NO-3435
- Website: Official website

Vågå (Norwegian pronunciation: [ˈvôːɡoː]) is a municipality in Innlandet county, Norway. It is located in the traditional district of Gudbrandsdal. The administrative centre of the municipality is the village of Vågåmo. Other village areas in the municipality include Bessheim, Besstrond, Lalm, Maurvangen, and Tessand.

The 1,330-square-kilometre (510 sq mi) municipality is the 73rd largest by area out of the 357 municipalities in Norway. Vågå Municipality is the 217th most populous municipality in Norway with a population of 3,529. The municipality's population density is 2.7 inhabitants per square kilometre (7.0/sq mi) and its population has decreased by 4.2% over the previous 10-year period.

== General information ==
The prestegjeld of Vaage was established as a municipality on 1 January 1838 (see formannskapsdistrikt law). On 1 January 1908, the municipality was divided into three parts:

- the northeastern part (population: 2,287) became Sel Municipality
- the southeastern part (population: 1,241) became Hedalen Municipality
- the remaining areas in the west (population: 2,953) remained as Vaage municipality

During the 1960s, there were many municipal changes across Norway due to the work of the Schei Committee. On 1 January 1965, the Tolstadåsen area of Vågå Municipality (population: 35) was transferred to the neighboring Sel Municipality.

Historically, the municipality was part of the old Oppland county. On 1 January 2020, the municipality became a part of the newly-formed Innlandet county (after Hedmark and Oppland counties were merged).

=== Name ===
The municipality (originally the parish) is named Vågå, using a very old name for the area (Old Norse: Vaga or Vága), in use since the first Vågå Church was built there. Two origins have been suggested for the name Vågå (historic spelling: Vaage):

- The name Vågå may come from the Old Norse word vega, meaning "travel". The area lies on an ancient east–west route mentioned in Heimskringla.
- The Old Norse form of the name may come from vaga (accusative and dative cases), from the word vagi (nominative case). It was probably originally the name of the lake Vågåvatn, but the meaning is unknown. (It may be derived from vage, which means "sleigh runner", since the shape of the lake has some similarity of form with a sleigh runner.)

Historically, the name of the municipality was spelled Vaage. On 3 November 1917, a royal resolution changed the spelling of the name of the municipality to Vaagaa. On 21 December 1917, a royal resolution enacted the 1917 Norwegian language reforms. Prior to this change, the name was spelled Vaagaa with the digraph ⟨aa⟩, and after this reform, the name was spelled Vågå, using the letter ⟨å⟩ instead. The letter ⟨å⟩ indicates a long vowel similar to "oh" or "aw", like in the American pronunciations of "cold" or "oar."

=== Coat of arms ===
The coat of arms was granted on 23 August 1985. The official blazon is "Gules, a reindeer springing Or" (Norwegian: På raud grunn eit springande gull reinsdyr på skrå oppover). This means the arms have a red field (background) and the charge is a springing reindeer. The reindeer has a tincture of Or which means it is commonly colored yellow, but if it is made out of metal, then gold is used. The design symbolizes the importance of reindeer herding and hunting. It is also based on a character in Henrik Ibsen's book Peer Gynt, who rides on a reindeer bull over the Besseggen mountains. Ibsen got the idea for this book from a local story. The arms were designed by Hans H. Holm and redrawn by Ola T. Rybakken. The municipal flag has the same design as the coat of arms.

=== Churches ===
The Church of Norway has one parish (sokn) within Vågå Municipality. It is part of the Nord-Gudbrandsdal prosti (deanery) in the Diocese of Hamar.

Churches in Vågå Municipality
Parish (sokn)	Church name	Location of the church	Year built
Vågå	Vågå Church	Vågåmo	1627

== Geography ==
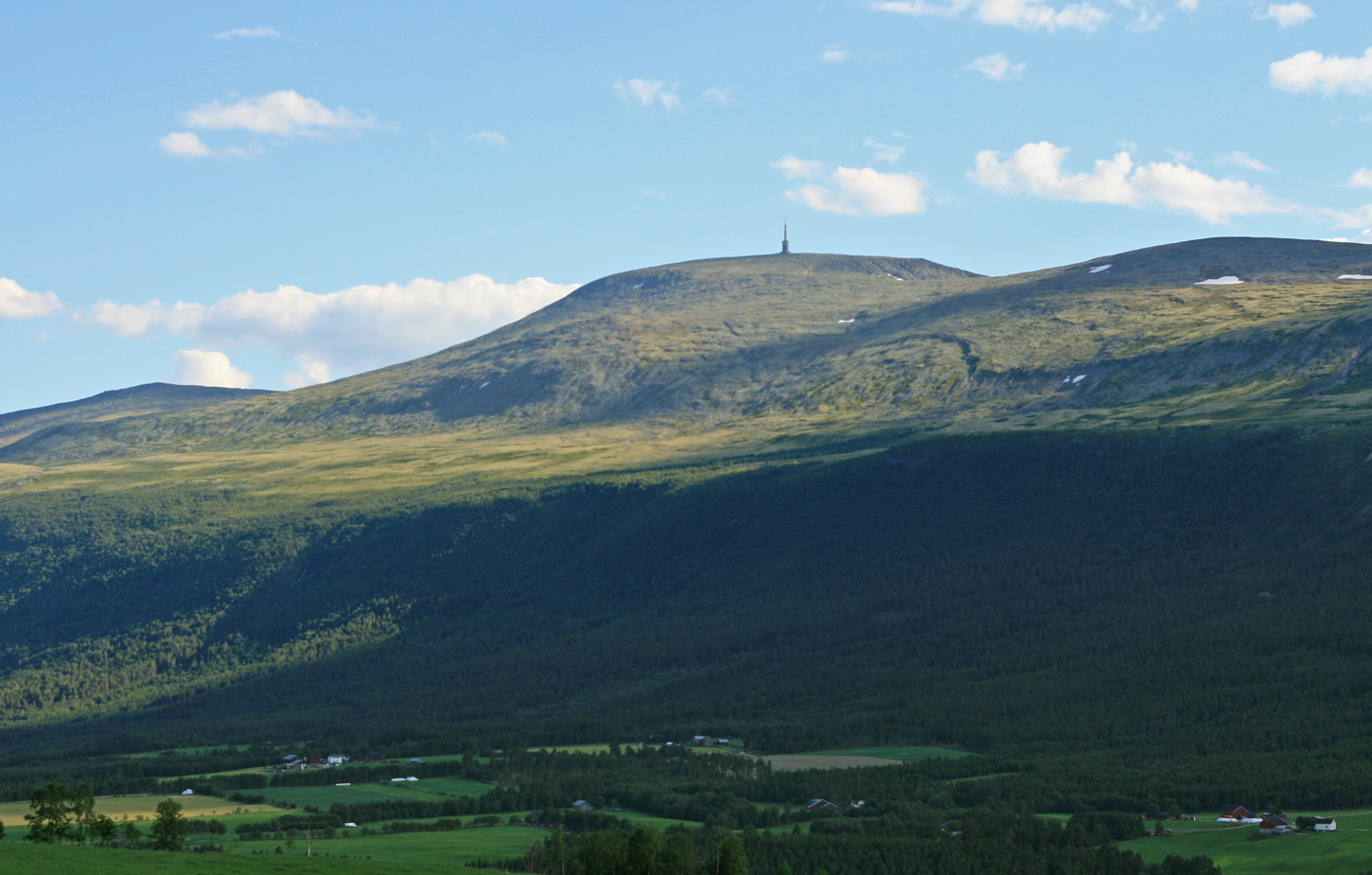
Jetta

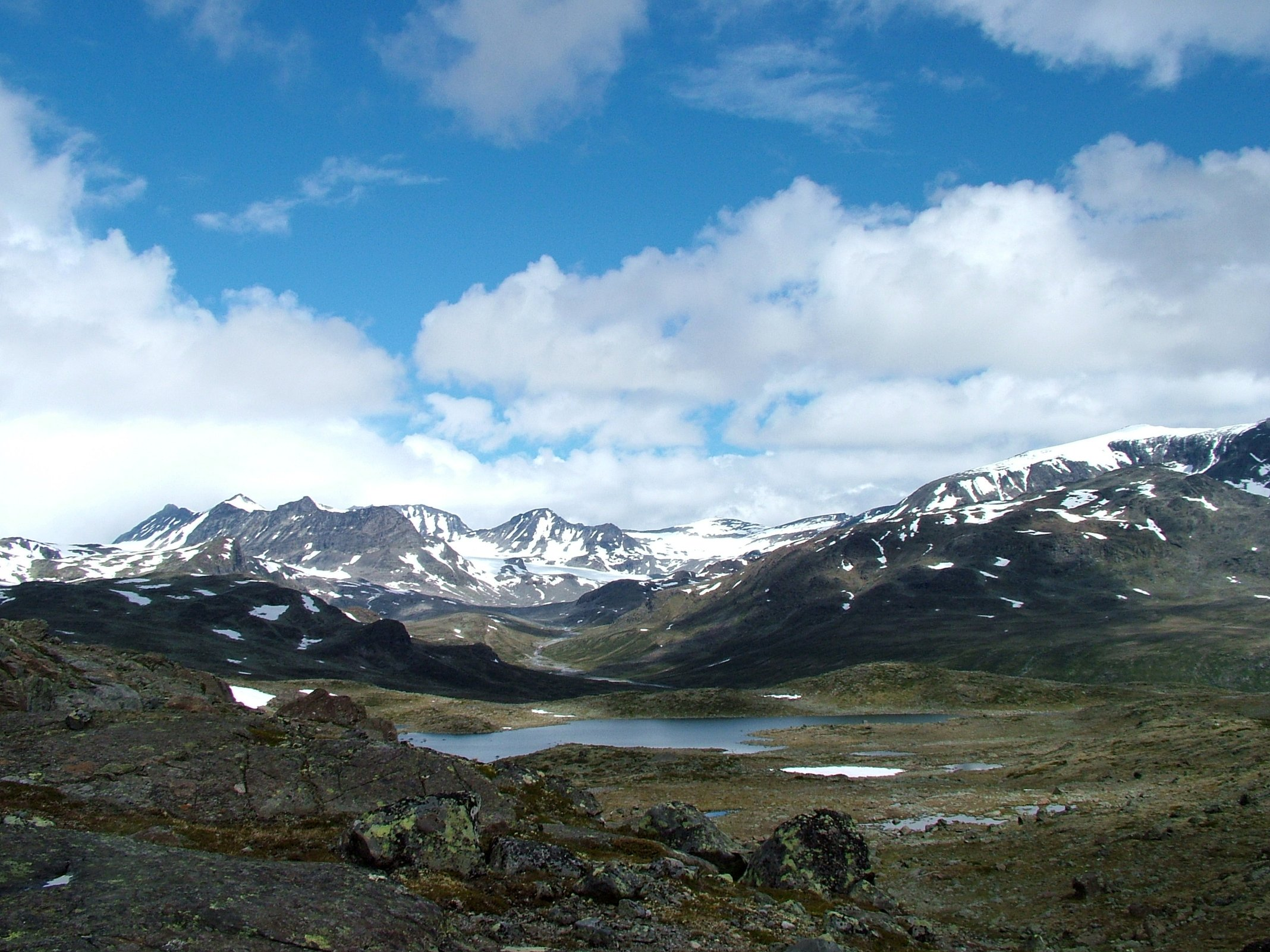
Jotunheimen Mountains

Vågå Municipality is bordered on the north by Lesja Municipality, in the east by Dovre Municipality and Sel Municipality, in the southeast by Nord-Fron Municipality, in the south by Vang Municipality and Øystre Slidre Municipality, and in the west by Lom Municipality.

Vågå Municipality lies in a mountainous region just to the east of Norway's Jotunheimen National Park, west of Rondane National Park, and south of the Dovrefjell mountains. The highest point in the municipality is the 2,367.64-metre (7,767.8 ft) tall mountain Surtningssue, located on the border with Lom Municipality. Vågå Municipality includes a mountain road to the top of the1,618-metre (5,308 ft) tall Jetta mountain which provides an unobstructed view of both the Gudbrandsdalen valley and the surrounding national parks.

The river Otta begins in Skjåk Municipality and flows into Vågåvatn lake. Exiting the lake Vågåvatn at Vågåmo, the river continues its journey through the Ottadalen valley leaving Vågå Municipality to meet the Gudbrandsdalslågen river at the town of Otta in Sel Municipality. Lakes in the region include Flatningen.

=== Climate ===
Vågå lies in the rain shadow from the Jotunheimen mountains which separate Eastern and Western Norway. The climate is hence characterized by a continental climate. Warm summers and cold winters dominate, and the precipitation is very low. In fact, during some years it receives less than 300 millimetres (12 in) of precipitation.

This dry continental climate makes Vågå Municipality an obvious place for the national hang glider and para glider centre of Norway.

=== Physical geography ===
Although being affected by the ice-sheet history spanning the Quaternary period of the last 2.5 million years, much of the landscape are moderately imprinted by ice-sheet erosion except from in the main valleys. Even these valleys including Sjodalen and Ottadalen are of pre-Quaternary origin, and were originally sculptured by fluvial rather than glacial erosion. The numerous lakes does remind us of the glacial history, although being much more limited than in the more dramatic [fiord]s of western Norway.

This limited glacial erosion also means that Vågå Municipality had limited glacial erosion during the last glacial period. Many findings of Mammoth pre-dating the Last Glacial Maximum (LGM) have been found, being evidence of the conservative nature of the LGM in the region.

== History ==
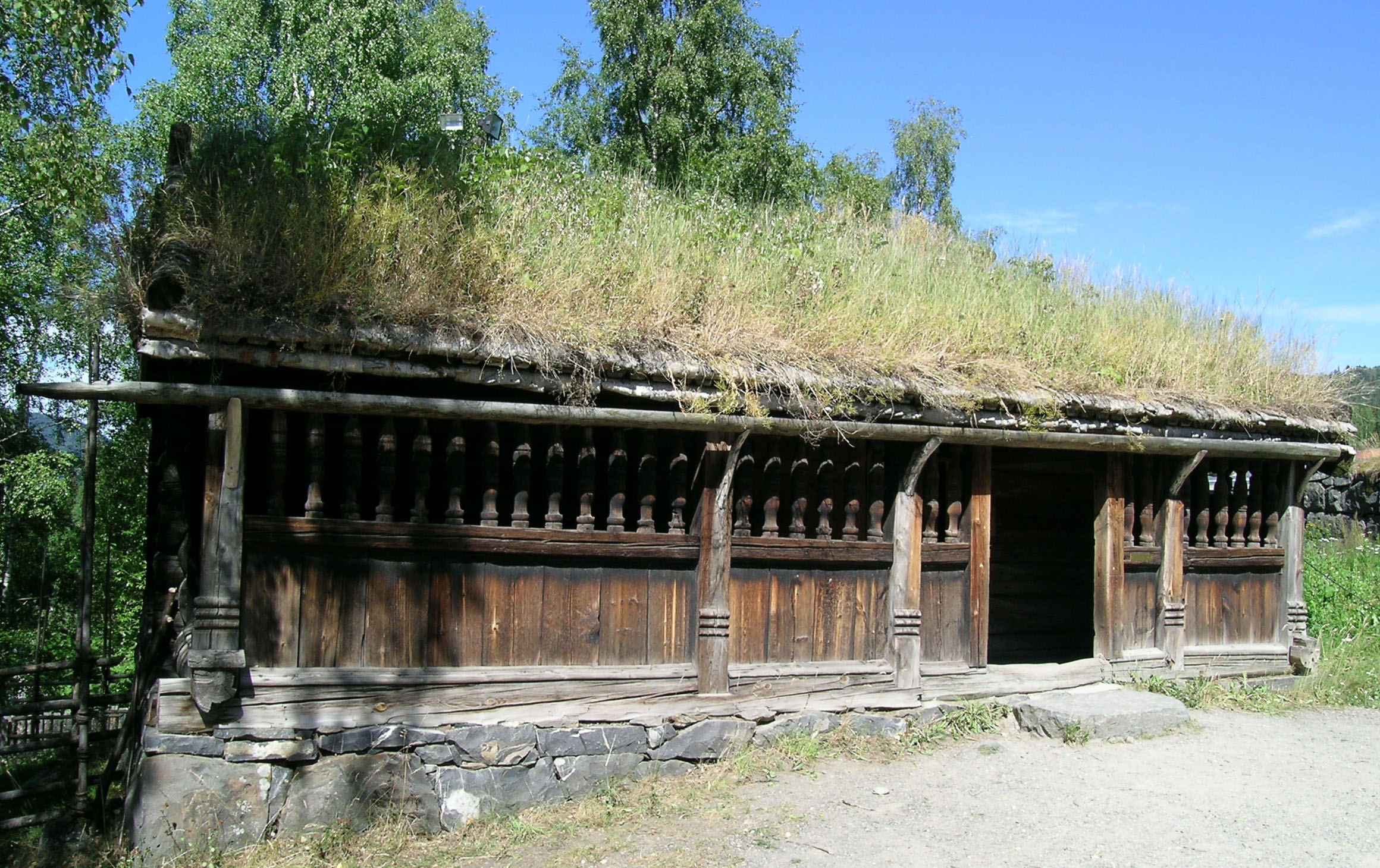
Årestue (open-hearth room) from Tolstadskriden, Vågå, Oppland

Number of minorities (1st and 2nd generation) in Vågå by country of origin in 2017
Ancestry	Number
Eritrea	34
Lithuania	27
Poland	20
Iraq	14
Thailand	12

The area of today's Vågå Municipality is mentioned in the Heimskringla (English: The Chronicle of the Kings of Norway) by Snorri Sturluson. The old Norse saga (Conversion of Dale-Gudbrand) relates that after King Olaf stayed several nights in Lesja, he proceeded south across the uplands to the Ottadal, and the beautiful hamlet lying there on both sides of the Otta river. King Olaf remained there five days, summoning the residents of Vågå, Lom, and Heidal to a meeting (ting). They were advised they must either receive Christianity and give their sons as hostages, or see their habitations burnt. Many submitted to his demands.

Vågå Stave Church is the second oldest stave church in the country, which was constructed around 1150 and originally dedicated to St. Peter. It was converted to a cruciform church in 1625; the carved portal and wall planks are original. The baptismal font dates from the original church and a Gothic crucifix from the 13th century can be seen there as well.

In 1130, Ivar Gjesling was the earliest-known owner of Sandbu (just north of Vågåmo) in Vågå. He was also King Magnus IV's lendmann for the Opplands. Sigrid Undset's fictional Lady Ragnfrid, wife of Lavrans, was created a Gjesling from Sandbu. Ivar Gjesling, allied himself with the Birchlegs (Birkebeinerne) — who chose Sverre as their king at Øreting in 1177. Sverre granted him the valley of Heidal as a reward.

Farmers from Vågå participated in the successful attack on Scottish mercenary troops journeying to join Swedish forces in 1612. The legends of the Battle of Kringen lives on to this day, including the story of how the peasant girl Prillar-Guri lured the Scots into an ambush by playing of the traditional ram's horn.

Ole Paulssøn Haagenstad (1775–1866) was in 1814 summoned by Christian-Frederick to plan the defense of Gudbrandsdalen in the event of a Swedish attack.

Over 150 houses in the municipality are designated as historic landmarks.

== Government ==
Vågå Municipality is responsible for primary education (through 10th grade), outpatient health services, senior citizen services, welfare and other social services, zoning, economic development, and municipal roads and utilities. The municipality is governed by a municipal council of directly elected representatives. The mayor is indirectly elected by a vote of the municipal council. The municipality is under the jurisdiction of the Gudbrandsdal District Court and the Eidsivating Court of Appeal.

=== Municipal council ===
The municipal council (Kommunestyre) of Vågå Municipality is made up of 17 representatives that are elected to four year terms. The tables below show the current and historical composition of the council by political party.

Vågå kommunestyre 2023–2027
Party name (in Nynorsk)	Number of representatives
Labour Party (Arbeidarpartiet)	5
Centre Party (Senterpartiet)	3
Socialist Left Party (Sosialistisk Venstreparti)	2
Local list in Vågå (Bygdalista i Vågå)	7
Total number of members:	17

Vågå kommunestyre 2019–2023
Party name (in Nynorsk)	Number of representatives
Labour Party (Arbeidarpartiet)	5
Centre Party (Senterpartiet)	6
Socialist Left Party (Sosialistisk Venstreparti)	2
Local list in Vågå (Bygdalista i Vågå)	4
Total number of members:	17

Vågå kommunestyre 2015–2019
Party name (in Nynorsk)	Number of representatives
Labour Party (Arbeidarpartiet)	7
Centre Party (Senterpartiet)	6
Socialist Left Party (Sosialistisk Venstreparti)	1
Local list in Vågå (Bygdalista i Vågå)	3
Total number of members:	17

Vågå kommunestyre 2011–2015
Party name (in Nynorsk)	Number of representatives
Labour Party (Arbeidarpartiet)	13
Centre Party (Senterpartiet)	3
Socialist Left Party (Sosialistisk Venstreparti)	1
Local list for cross-party cooperation (Bygdalista for tverrpolitisk samarbeid)	4
Total number of members:	21

Vågå kommunestyre 2007–2011
Party name (in Nynorsk)	Number of representatives
Labour Party (Arbeidarpartiet)	15
Centre Party (Senterpartiet)	3
Socialist Left Party (Sosialistisk Venstreparti)	1
Local list for cross-party cooperation (Bygdalista for tverrpolitisk samarbeid)	2
Total number of members:	21

Vågå kommunestyre 2003–2007
Party name (in Nynorsk)	Number of representatives
Labour Party (Arbeidarpartiet)	14
Centre Party (Senterpartiet)	3
Socialist Left Party (Sosialistisk Venstreparti)	1
Local list for cross-party cooperation (Bygdalista for tverrpolitisk samarbeid)	3
Total number of members:	21

Vågå kommunestyre 1999–2003
Party name (in Nynorsk)	Number of representatives
Labour Party (Arbeidarpartiet)	11
Centre Party (Senterpartiet)	6
Socialist Left Party (Sosialistisk Venstreparti)	1
Local list for cross-party cooperation (Bygdalista for tverrpolitisk samarbeid)	3
Total number of members:	21

Vågå kommunestyre 1995–1999
Party name (in Nynorsk)	Number of representatives
Labour Party (Arbeidarpartiet)	9
Centre Party (Senterpartiet)	4
Socialist Left Party (Sosialistisk Venstreparti)	2
Local list for cross-party cooperation (Bygdalista for tverrpolitisk samarbeid)	6
Total number of members:	21

Vågå kommunestyre 1991–1995
Party name (in Nynorsk)	Number of representatives
Labour Party (Arbeidarpartiet)	7
Centre Party (Senterpartiet)	4
Socialist Left Party (Sosialistisk Venstreparti)	3
Local list for cross-party cooperation (Bygdalista for tverrpolitisk samarbeid)	7
Total number of members:	21

Vågå kommunestyre 1987–1991
Party name (in Nynorsk)	Number of representatives
Labour Party (Arbeidarpartiet)	13
Conservative Party (Høgre)	1
Centre Party (Senterpartiet)	4
Socialist Left Party (Sosialistisk Venstreparti)	1
Local list for cross-party cooperation (Bygdalista for tverrpolitisk samarbeid)	2
Total number of members:	21

Vågå kommunestyre 1983–1987
Party name (in Nynorsk)	Number of representatives
Labour Party (Arbeidarpartiet)	12
Conservative Party (Høgre)	2
Centre Party (Senterpartiet)	4
Socialist Left Party (Sosialistisk Venstreparti)	1
Local list for cross-party cooperation (Bygdalista for tverrpolitisk samarbeid)	2
Total number of members:	21

Vågå kommunestyre 1979–1983
Party name (in Nynorsk)	Number of representatives
Labour Party (Arbeidarpartiet)	12
Conservative Party (Høgre)	1
Centre Party (Senterpartiet)	5
Socialist Left Party (Sosialistisk Venstreparti)	1
Local list for cross-party cooperation (Bygdalista for tverrpolitisk samarbeid)	2
Total number of members:	21

Vågå kommunestyre 1975–1979
Party name (in Nynorsk)	Number of representatives
Labour Party (Arbeidarpartiet)	13
Centre Party (Senterpartiet)	6
Socialist Left Party (Sosialistisk Venstreparti)	1
Joint list of the Conservative Party and Free Voters (Høyre og Frie Veljarar)	1
Total number of members:	21

Vågå kommunestyre 1971–1975
Party name (in Nynorsk)	Number of representatives
Labour Party (Arbeidarpartiet)	13
Conservative Party (Høgre)	1
Centre Party (Senterpartiet)	6
Socialist People's Party (Sosialistisk Folkeparti)	1
Total number of members:	21

Vågå kommunestyre 1967–1971
Party name (in Nynorsk)	Number of representatives
Labour Party (Arbeidarpartiet)	14
Conservative Party (Høgre)	1
Centre Party (Senterpartiet)	6
Total number of members:	21

Vågå kommunestyre 1963–1967
Party name (in Nynorsk)	Number of representatives
Labour Party (Arbeidarpartiet)	12
Centre Party (Senterpartiet)	6
List of workers, fishermen, and small farmholders (Arbeidarar, fiskarar, småbrukarar liste)	3
Total number of members:	21

Vågå heradsstyre 1959–1963
Party name (in Nynorsk)	Number of representatives
Labour Party (Arbeidarpartiet)	10
Centre Party (Senterpartiet)	6
Liberal Party (Venstre)	1
List of workers, fishermen, and small farmholders (Arbeidarar, fiskarar, småbrukarar liste)	4
Total number of members:	21

Vågå heradsstyre 1955–1959
Party name (in Nynorsk)	Number of representatives
Labour Party (Arbeidarpartiet)	14
Farmers' Party (Bondepartiet)	7
Total number of members:	21

Vågå heradsstyre 1951–1955
Party name (in Nynorsk)	Number of representatives
Labour Party (Arbeidarpartiet)	12
Farmers' Party (Bondepartiet)	6
Liberal Party (Venstre)	1
Local List(s) (Lokale lister)	1
Total number of members:	20

Vågå heradsstyre 1947–1951
Party name (in Nynorsk)	Number of representatives
Labour Party (Arbeidarpartiet)	12
Christian Democratic Party (Kristeleg Folkeparti)	1
Farmers' Party (Bondepartiet)	6
Joint list of the Liberal Party (Venstre) and the Radical People's Party (Radikale Folkepartiet)	1
Total number of members:	20

Vågå heradsstyre 1945–1947
Party name (in Nynorsk)	Number of representatives
Labour Party (Arbeidarpartiet)	13
Farmers' Party (Bondepartiet)	5
Joint list of the Liberal Party (Venstre) and the Radical People's Party (Radikale Folkepartiet)	2
Total number of members:	20

Vågå heradsstyre 1937–1941*
Party name (in Nynorsk)	Number of representatives
Labour Party (Arbeidarpartiet)	11
Farmers' Party (Bondepartiet)	5
Local List(s) (Lokale lister)	4
Total number of members:	20
Note: Due to the German occupation of Norway during World War II, no elections were held for new municipal councils until after the war ended in 1945.

=== Mayors ===
The mayor (Nynorsk: ordførar) of Vågå Municipality is the political leader of the municipality and the chairperson of the municipal council. Since 1946, all mayors with three exceptions have represented the Norwegian Labour Party. Here is a list of people who have held this position:

- 1838–1865: Andreas Molbech Lundh
- 1866–1867: Ole Syversen Wæggum
- 1868–1869: John Syversen Blessum
- 1870–1872: Iver Olsen Lunde
- 1872–1875: John Syversen Blessum
- 1876–1879: Ole Lunde Sørem
- 1880–1881: John Syversen Blessum
- 1882–1883: Iver Johannessen Sandnes
- 1884–1887: Christian Antonsen Horne
- 1888–1889: Jens Christian Krohg
- 1890–1901: Hans Andersen Raastad (V)
- 1902–1904: John Olsen Nordahl (LL)
- 1905–1907: Ole Iversen Moen (LL)
- 1908–1908: Syver Erichson (LL)
- 1908–1910: Ole Iversen Moen (LL)
- 1911–1916: Kristoffer Hansen Hole (V)
- 1917–1931: Johan Knudsen Øverstedal (ArbDem)
- 1932–1932: Hans Olsen Hjelvik (Ap)
- 1932–1934: Ole Olsen Sveen (Ap)
- 1935–1941: Syver Larsen Kleiven (Ap)
- 1941–1944: Iver Valde (NS)
- 1944–1945: Sigurd Stokstad (NS)
- 1945–1945: Syver Larsen Kleiven (Ap)
- 1946–1951: Ole Martinus Høgåsen (Ap)
- 1952–1959: Anders Persen Bjørkheim (Ap)
- 1960–1961: Ola Olsen Kleiven (LL)
- 1961–1963: Kaspar Johansen Øvstedal (Ap)
- 1963–1983: Sigurd Kristoffersen Granrud (Ap)
- 1983–1987: Sverre Damstuen (Ap)
- 1987–1991: Kjell Olsen Nyhus (Ap)
- 1991–1995: Kari Hølmo Holen (Sp)
- 1995–2011: Rune Øygard (Ap)
- 2011–2019: Iselin Jonassen (Ap)
- 2019–present: Harald Sve Bjørndal (BL)

== Politics ==
=== Øygard case ===
In the September 2011 election, Rune Øygard was reelected as mayor, after having served in that role since 1995. His reelection by the municipal council was controversial as he was already under police investigation for alleged child sexual abuse, the so-called Øygard case, sometimes also referred to as the Vågå case. Øygard was granted temporary leave following his indictment in the case, and was succeeded as acting mayor by Iselin Jonassen (Labour) on 8 May 2012. After being found guilty and sentenced to four years imprisonment, Rune Øygard resigned as mayor. His resignation was granted by the municipal council on 18 December 2012, effective immediately.

== Notable people ==
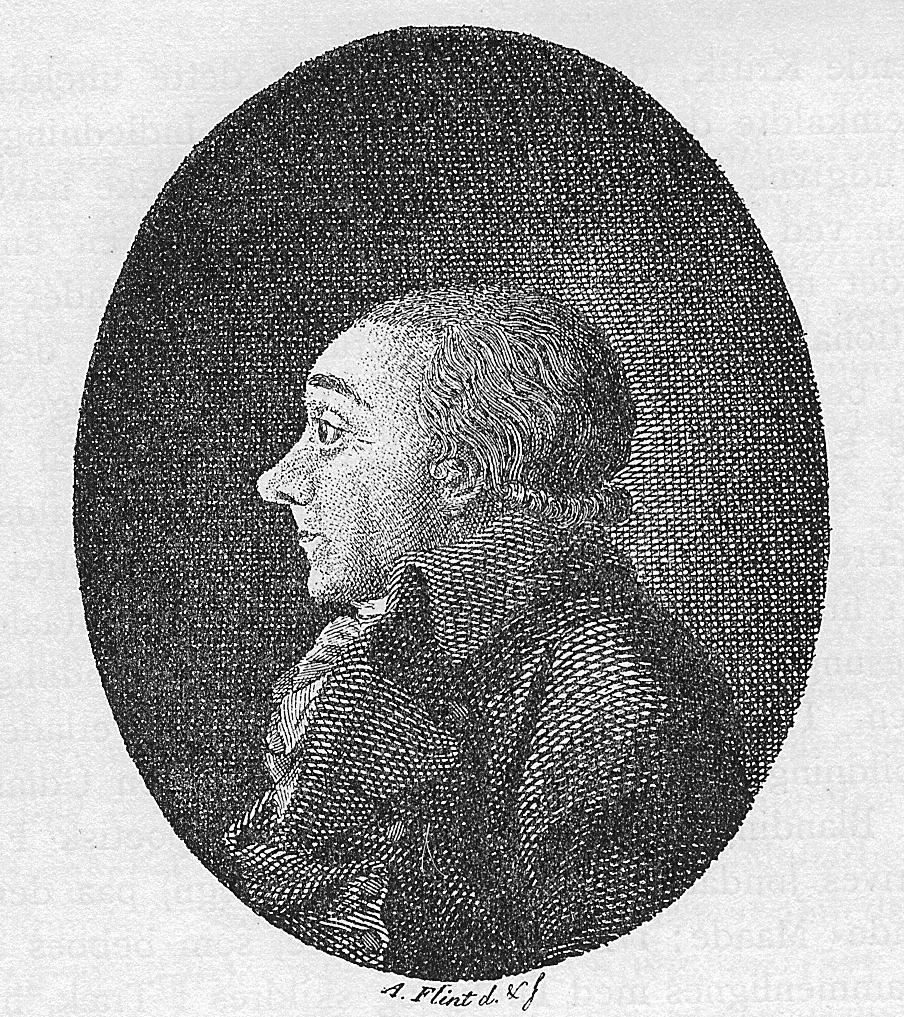
Edvard Storm

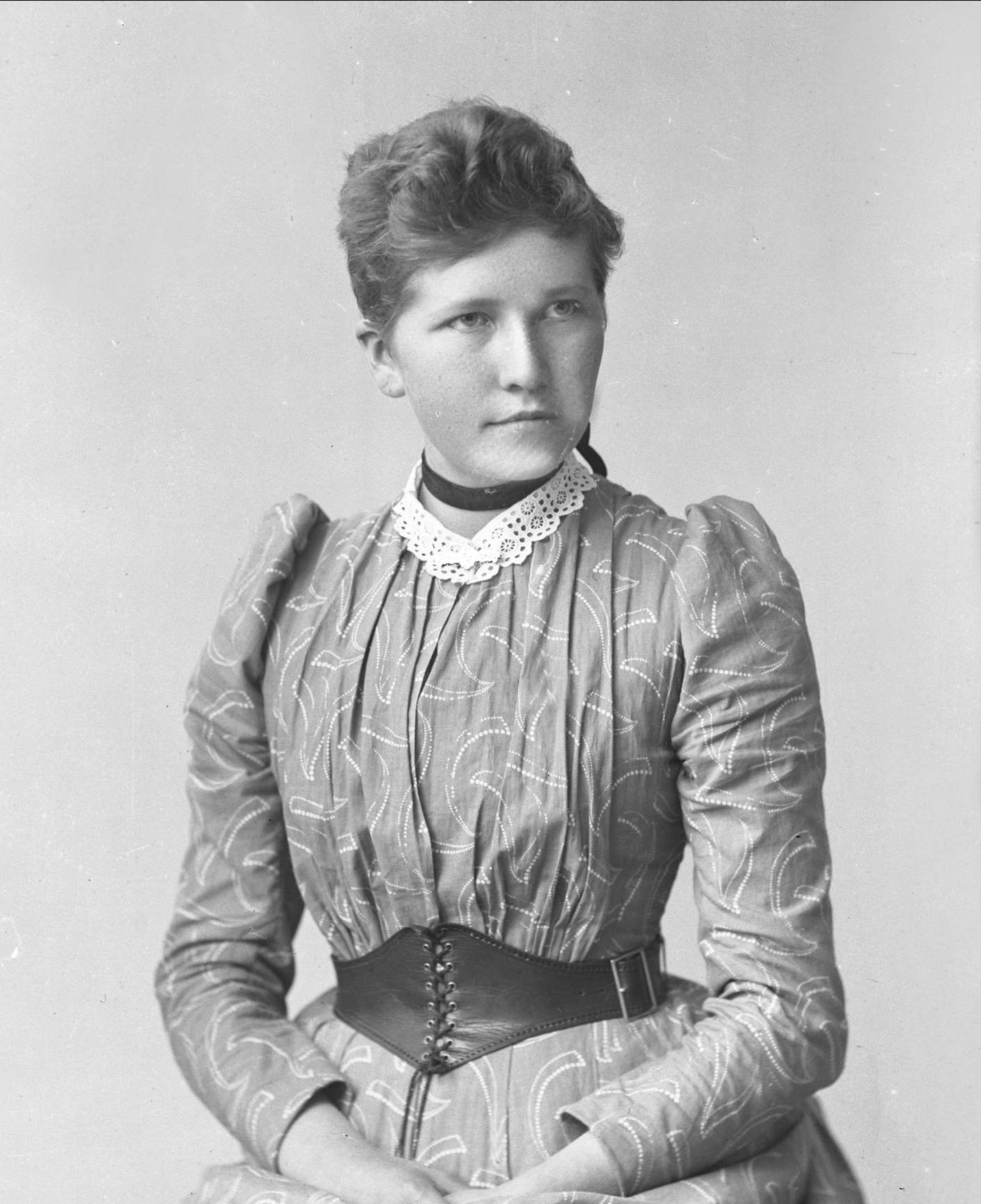
Thekla Resvoll, 1891

- Edvard Storm (1749 in Vågå – 1794), a poet, songwriter, and educator
- Johan Storm Munch (1778 at Vågå – 1832), a Bishop in the Church of Norway, poet, playwright, and magazine editor
- Jo Gjende (1794 in Vågå – 1884), an outdoorsman and freethinker who may have been the model for Henrik Ibsen’s Peer Gynt
- Ole Herman Johannes Krag (1837 in Vågå – 1916), a Norwegian officer and firearms designer
- Ivar Kleiven (1854 in Vågå – 1934), a politician, historian, poet, and collector of local folklore
- Kristian Prestgard (1866 in Heidal – 1946), an American journalist, author, and editor of Decorah-Posten
- Kristen Holbø (1869 in Vågå – 1953), a painter of landscapes and illustrator
- Thekla Resvoll (1871 in Vågå – 1948), a botanist and educator
- Benjamin Blessum (1877–1954), a Norwegian-American painter and illustrator whose parents were from Vågå
- Ragnvald Skrede (1904 in Vågå – 1983), an author, journalist, literature critic, and poet
- Ivar P. Enge (1922 in Vågå – 2013), a radiologist who specialized in interventional radiology
- Arne Brimi (born 1957), a chef and food writer that lives and works in Vågå

== Sister cities ==
Vågå has sister city agreements with the following places:

- – Tierps, Uppsala County, Sweden
