= Rune Øygard =

Norwegian politician and criminal

Mayor of Vågå Municipality
- In office 1995–2012
- Preceded by: Kari Hølmo Holen
- Succeeded by: Iselin Jonassen (acting)

Personal details
- Born: 27 April 1959 (age 67)
- Party: Norwegian Labour Party
- Spouse: Reidun Øygard

Rune Øygard (born 27 April 1959) is a former Norwegian politician representing the Norwegian Labour Party, who served as mayor of Vågå Municipality from 1995 to 2012 when he was granted leave following his indictment for child sexual abuse in a much publicized case, the so-called Vågå case. On 17 December 2012, he was found guilty of child sexual abuse, including sexual intercourse with a 13-year-old girl, and sentenced to 4 years imprisonment. The same day, he resigned as mayor.

== Early life and civil career ==
Øygard grew up in Skjåk Municipality, a neighbouring municipality to Vågå where he was born. He was co-owner of a book store in Vågå Municipality and subsequently editor-in-chief of the local radio station Ottadalsradioen before entering full-time politics in 1995 when he was elected mayor. Øygard has formerly been Secretary-General of the Norwegian youth organisation Norges Bygdeungdomslag (Norwegian Rural Youth).

== Political career ==
He was regarded as a successful mayor who was described by Prime Minister Jens Stoltenberg as one of his political role models. According to the NRK, he has for several years been one of the Labour Party's most prominent mayors nationwide. In the 2007 Norwegian local elections, his party got 70% of the votes in Vågå. In 2009, the nationwide publication Kommunal Rapport named him "Municipal Figure of the Year." Øygard has been described as a "fairly high-ranking figure" within the Labour Party. In September 2011, he was indicted by Norwegian police of child sexual abuse, and in May 2012, he requested temporary leave from his office as Mayor pending the outcome of his imminent trial. His much publicized trial started in October 2012, dominating news coverage of Norwegian media.

Øygard was asked to resign permanently by his own party, but refused to do so. After being found guilty and sentenced to four years imprisonment, Rune Øygard resigned as mayor. His resignation was granted by the municipal council on 18 December 2012, effective immediately.

== Trials (the Øygard case) ==
He came to broad national media attention when he was indicted by the police (siktet) of child sexual abuse in 2011. Despite being indicted of child sexual abuse, he was reelected as mayor by the municipal council following the 2011 Norwegian local elections. He only asked for temporary leave from his political office in May 2012, following his final indictment by the public prosecutor (tiltale) the previous month and repeated calls to leave office from the Secretary-General of his party (Raymond Johansen) since his first indictment the year before. His trial started in October 2012. He is accused of sexually abusing a girl who was under the age of 14 (and 37 years his junior), over several years, including more than 50 instances of sexual intercourse from the girl was 13 years old. Adding to the interest in the case, Øygard had met the girl together with Prime Minister Jens Stoltenberg several times (including in the Prime Minister's home), leading the girl's lawyer to ask for Stoltenberg to testify in the case; however, the public prosecutor in the case, Thorbjørn Klundseter, opted against this.

Iselin Jonassen became acting mayor of Vågå Municipality in Øygard's absence.

On 12 October 2012, Prime Minister Jens Stoltenberg and the central leadership of the Norwegian Labour Party demanded that Øygard be removed from his position as mayor in light of the revelations. The following day, it became known that Øygard refuses to resign voluntarily.

=== Verdict ===
He was found guilty of child sexual abuse and sentenced to 4 years imprisonment on 17 December 2012 by Sør-Gudbrandsdal District Court. (The maximum punishment stipulated by the laws that he broke, were 10 years in prison and a mandatory minimum sentence of 3 years.) Restitution to his victim was set at NOK 150,000 and he was ordered to pay NOK 25,000 in legal costs.

=== Appellate court ===
On 29 April 2013 he testified in the trial in the appellate court. On 30 May 2013, he was sentenced to one year and three months in prison.

=== Supreme Court ===
The Supreme Court of Norway made the final verdict in the case on 26 September 2013, after appeals by both Øygard and the prosecutor. The Supreme Court confirmed the appellate court's guilty verdict, and increased Øygard's sentence to two years and three months. Øygard reported to begin serving his sentence at Ullersmo Prison on 11 December 2013.
