= Watha =

Watha can refer to:

- Watha, North Carolina, a township in the U.S. state of North Carolina
- Watha dialect, part of the indigenous Australian Western Desert Language
- Watha people, a hunter-gatherer culture in East Africa (mainly Kenya)
