= Stai =

Stai is a Norwegian surname derived from the Norwegian places named Stai. Notable people with the surname include:

- Anette Stai (born 1961), Norwegian model
- Brenden Stai (born 1972), American football player
- Dian Graves Stai (born 1940), American businesswoman and philanthropist
- Elli Stai (born 1954), Greek journalist and talk show presenter
- Erik Stai (1915–2004), Norwegian high jumper
- Kari Stai (born 1974), Norwegian illustrator, graphic designer and children's writer
