= Otta seal =

Type of bituminous surface treatment

Otta seal is a type of bituminous surface treatment that was developed by the Norwegian Road Research Laboratory (NRRL). Its name is based on the location in which it was created, the Otta Valley. Otta seal was developed to be used as a temporary surfacing on new roads; however, after seeing its strength, it has been used as permanent roads as well.

== Composition and application ==
Otta seal is formed by adding graded aggregate to a soft bituminous binding agent. The agent is usually emulsified asphalt. Bituminous binder application rates are between 1.9 liter/m^{2} (0.42 US gallon/yard^{2}) and 2.4 liter/m^{2} (0.53 US gallon/yard^{2}) – the value is dependent on aggregate gradation and type. Low quality, local aggregates are often used in Otta seal. The largest aggregate size used is between 13 and 25mm (0.5 and 1 inch). The aggregate can contain up to 10% fine gravels. Aggregate quantities are usually close to 27 kg/m^{2} (50 lbs/yard^{2}). Otta seal is easily cured by blinding with sand because of its soft binders. The soft binders quickly coat the sand; this is not possible for seals with harder binders. Cutback bitumens in the viscosity range of MC3000 to MC800 are the most common binders used.

Otta seal is formed in the following procedure:

1. Remove dust and foreign objects from the base.
2. Add small amounts of water to the base to suppress dust.
3. Apply a hot binder at a rate of 1.6 to 1.9 liters/m2.
4. Apply aggregate at a rate of 1.3 to 2.0 m3 to 100m2 (depending on the grading of the aggregate) of road surface.
5. Flatten the Otta seal using a tired roller until binder is pressing up between the aggregate particles. This usually has to be done multiple times, typically several days after the first flattening.
6. For the first two to three weeks, allow traffic at low speeds to assist with further kneading. Aggregates will be dislodged by traffic and they should be brushed back onto the seal.

== Where Otta seal is used ==
Otta seal is primarily used in places that do not have strict requirements for strength, grading, particle shape, binder adhesion, and dust content, which have low capital and expect relatively low traffic (up to 500 vehicles per day). Currently, Otta seal is most prevalent in Norway, Sweden, Iceland, and Botswana and common in Bangladesh, Australia, and parts of Africa.

== Costs ==
Otta seal is considered to be a low cost seal. With its low initial cost and less demanding maintenance, it is a very cheap alternative for road surfaces. The cost for a double layer Otta seal is about US $2.00 to US $2.70 per square meter (US $2.40 to US $3.25 per square yard) and will last from 8 to 15 years. For a road that is 1.6 km (1 mile) long and 12 m (40 feet) wide it would cost between US $39,000 to US $52,000.

== Physical properties ==
Otta seal is a type of road surfacing consisting of a bituminous binding substance and aggregate rocks ranging from gravel to fine particles. It is stronger than similar inexpensive surfacing techniques such as chip seal.

The type of bitumen used can greatly affect the strength of the road. Bitumen binders that are more viscous tend to move through the aggregate faster, but are not as hard and cannot handle heavier loads.

A huge advantage of Otta seal over other seals is the ability to use almost any type or size of crushed rocks as the aggregate. Depending on where in the world the road is being constructed and therefore what types of rock are available, the strength of an Otta seal can vary greatly. Commonly, the gravel used contains sandstone, basalt, and even coral or volcanic stones. Also, size of the particles varies greatly, with a preferred maximum of 16 mm and 19 mm (0.63 inch and 0.75 inch) for single and double Otta seals, respectively. Typically, the concentration of fine particles of less than 0.075 mm (0.003 inch) should be less than 10%.

Adhesive agents are generally added to increase the strength between the aggregate and the bituminous binder. It is this interaction that gives Otta seal its strength and durability.

== Pros and cons of Otta seal ==
There are many factors when considering what type of road surfacing is necessary. Most advantages to Otta seal over other inexpensive surfacing techniques spring from its ability to use a wide range of materials and material sizes during construction. Pros and cons are listed here:

=== Pros ===
- Can be used in remote areas with whatever gravel is available
- Less waste when using crushed material
- Cheaper, lower grade materials can be used
- More tolerant of pavement deflection
- Much less precise proportions, resulting in fewer mistakes
- More durable and less maintenance
- Workers require very little technical skill
- Resistance to cracking from solar radiation
- Impermeable, so water can run off
- Can be used in any climate
- Can be broken down and reused

=== Cons ===
- Requires more material
- Grade cannot exceed 8% for single Otta seal (12% for double)
- Must be applied at above 10 °C (50 °F)
- Excessive dust during installation process and weeks after.

== Durability and weathering ==
Otta seal is more durable than many alternative seals. It is impermeable and resistant to cracking from the sun’s radiation. Cracks form in all roads due to changes in temperature, but Otta seal performs better than other seals. Overall, Otta seal can be expected to last 50 to 60 percent longer than a chip seal. This results in a lifespan between 6 and 12 years if properly maintained, and even longer if a sand seal is used on top of the Otta seal.
