= Otta, Norway =

Town in Innlandet, Norway

Otta
- Town/City
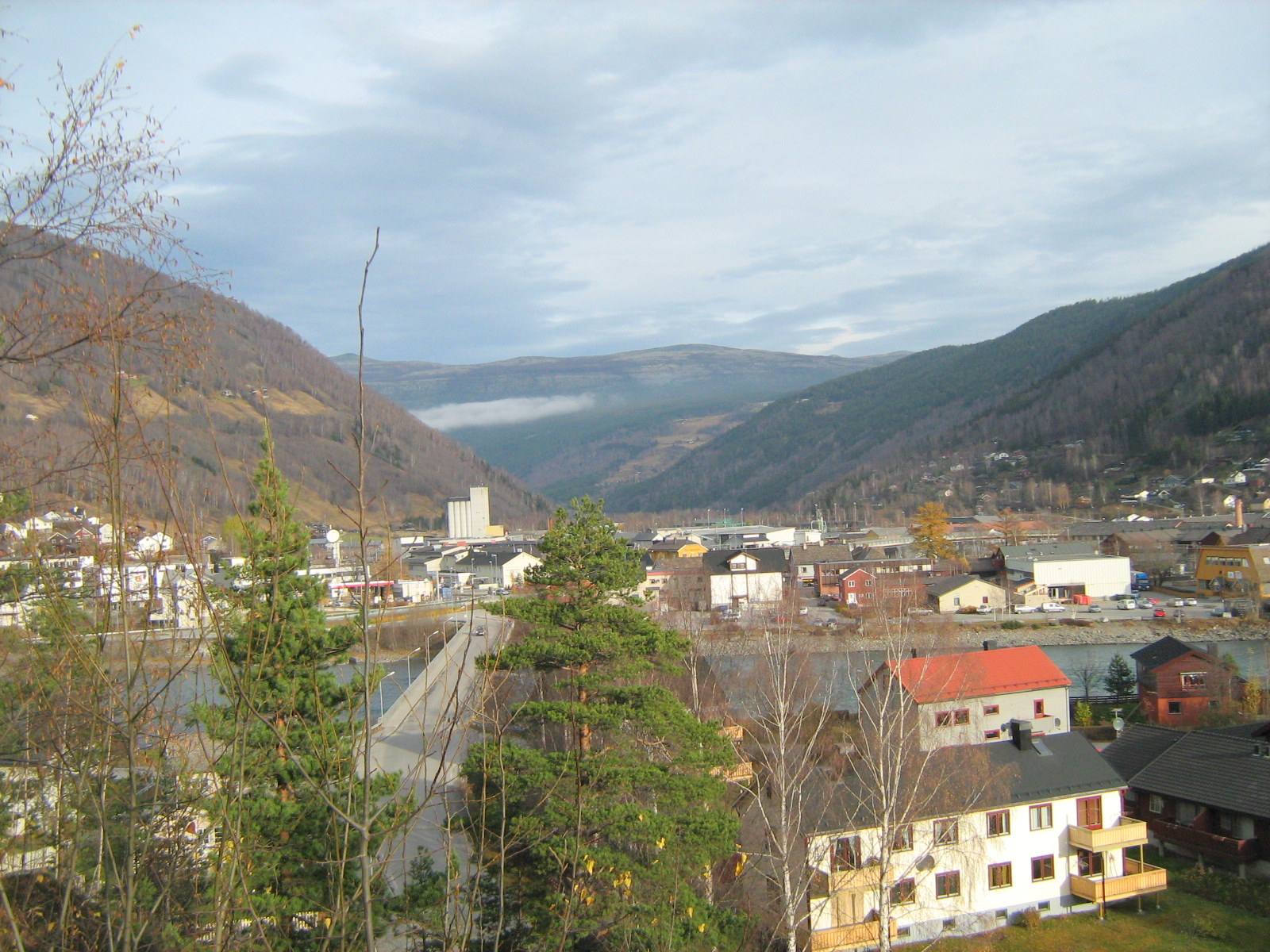
- View of the town
- Interactive map of Otta
- Location within Innlandet Location within Norway
- Coordinates: 61.77124°N 9.53525°E
- Country: Norway
- Region: Eastern Norway
- County: Innlandet
- District: Gudbrandsdalen
- Municipality: Sel Municipality
- Established as
- Town (By): 2000

Area
  - Total: 2.17 km^{2} (0.84 sq mi)
- Elevation: 287 m (942 ft)

Population (2024)
  - Total: 2,322
  - Density: 1,070/km^{2} (2,800/sq mi)
- Time zone: UTC+01:00 (CET)
  - Summer (DST): UTC+02:00 (CEST)
- Post Code: 2670 Otta

Otta is a town in Sel Municipality in Innlandet county, Norway. The town is also the administrative centre of the municipality. The town is located at the confluence of the Gudbrandsdalslågen and Otta rivers. The European route E6 highway runs through the town. The Dovrebanen railway line also passes through the town, stopping at the Otta Station. The 2.17-square-kilometre (540-acre) town has a population (2024) of 2,322 and a population density of 1,070 inhabitants per square kilometre (2,800/sq mi).

The town is named after the Otta river. The first three tiers of Norwegian education are covered by its primary and secondary schools and the high school, Otta vidaregående skule. Otta also has a regional medical clinic. Otta is one of the few towns in Norway without a church in the town centre. The Sel Church is located about 4 kilometres (2.5 mi) north of the town centre, just outside the town proper.

== Geography ==
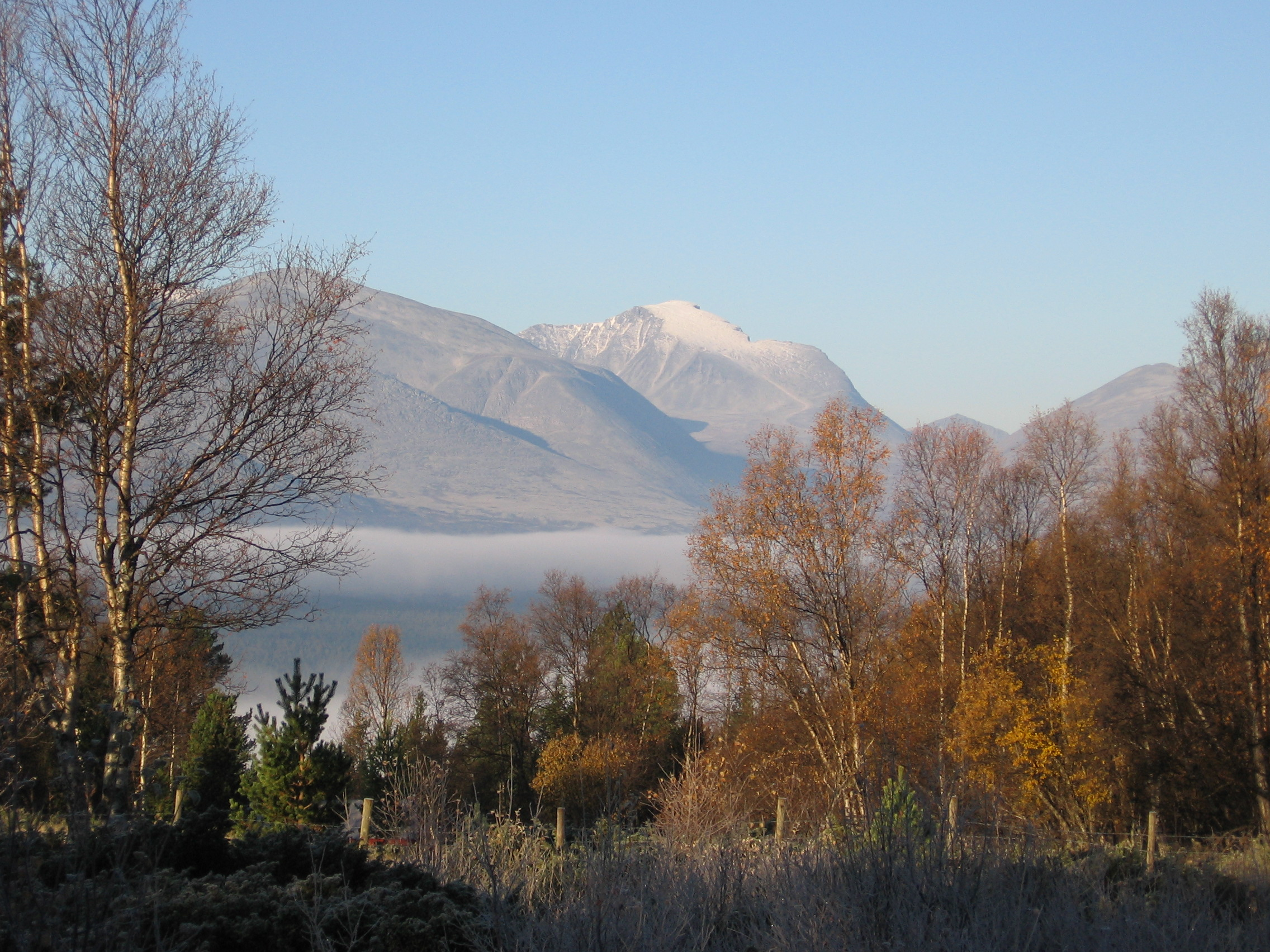
Mountains near Otta

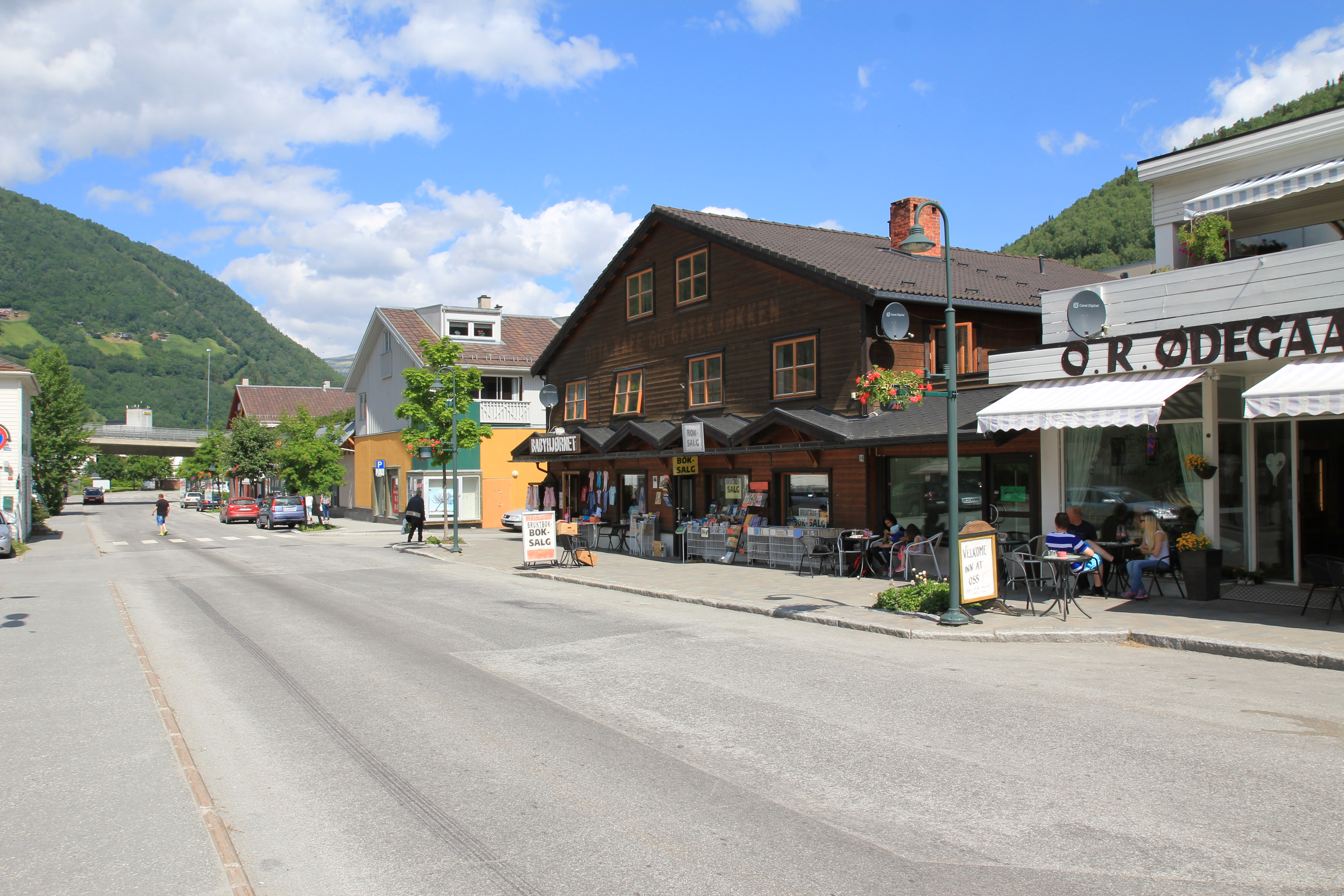
Central town of Otta

Situated about 110 kilometres (68 mi) north of Lillehammer, it spans the valley floor where the Ottadalen valley branches off of the main Gudbrandsdalen valley. The largely glacially-fed river Otta has a 4,000 square kilometres (1,500 sq mi) watershed in a very arid region and all of this water flows into the river Gudbrandsdalslågen at the town of Otta. To the northeast of the town lies the Rondane mountains and this area became part of Rondane National Park in 1962, the first national park in Norway. The park has several mountains reaching over 2,000 metres (6,600 ft) in elevation.

== Transportation ==
Otta sits roughly halfway between the major cities of Oslo and Trondheim along the European route E6 highway. The Norwegian National Road starts at Otta and it heads west through the Ottadalen valley and over the mountains to Stryn Municipality, along the Nordfjord, finally terminating in the town of Måløy on the west coast of Norway. Otta is also an important link on the Dovrebanen railway line, since Otta Station is the only station in the valley where every single passing passenger train stops.

== History ==
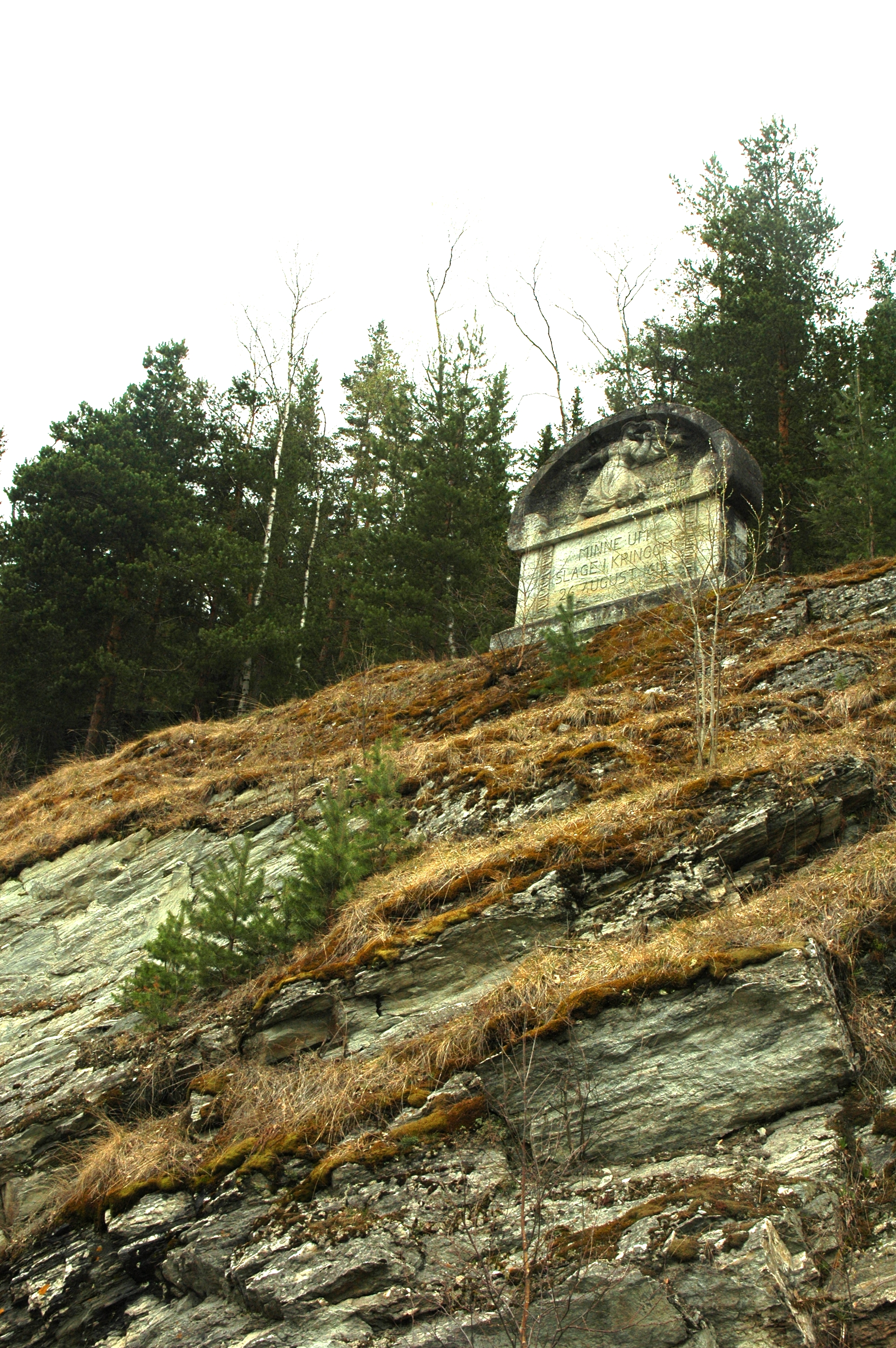
Kringen Monument

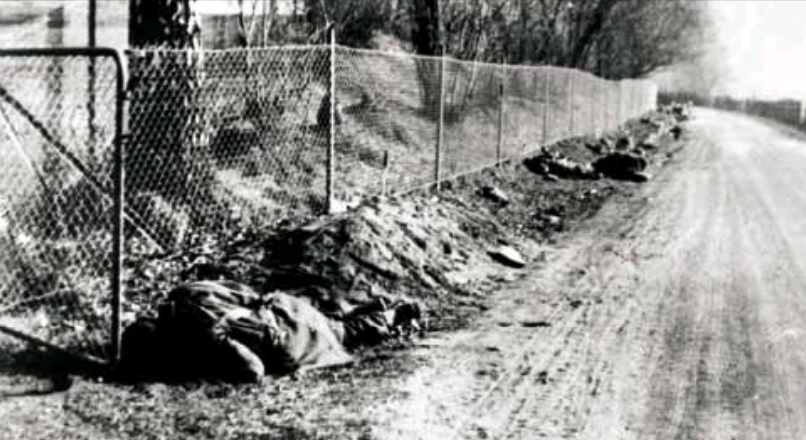
Dead British "Green Howards" after the battle at Otta, Norway. 28 April 1940

The location of Otta was historically just a farm area that was known as Aamot (or Åmot) which means "rivers against" signifying that this place was the meeting place of two rivers. From the 1600s to the 1800s, there were copper mines and iron ore mines located about 4–5 kilometres (2.5–3.1 mi) north of the present town. The historic Sel Church was built in this location due to its proximity to the mining area.

In 1612, this area was the site of the Battle of Kringen. There is a statue in Otta depicting Prillarguri, a semi-legendary figure who, according to oral tradition, was a woman from Sel who played a key role in the battle.

In 1896 Otta Station was built at the present site of the town about 4–5 kilometres (2.5–3.1 mi) south of the mining sites. This railway station became the northern terminus of the railroad for a decade. The place became known as Otta (named after the railway station, which was named after the river). Over time, a small village grew up around the railway station. In 1912, the railroad was completed from Otta to Dombås in 1912, and then ultimately being completed all the way to Trondheim in 1922.

On 28 April 1940, Otta saw extensive fighting between German and British forces during the last parts of the German advance up the Gudbrandsdalen valley, as part of the German conquest of Norway. Company C and D of the British Green Howards fought elements of the German 196th infantry division under Richard Pellengahr supported by artillery and tanks. Equipped with 25 mm Hotchkiss anti-tank guns and Boys anti-tank rifles, the British managed to disable three German tanks, including killing two crew members of a Panzerkampfwagen Ib with an anti-tank rifle, but by late evening, the British had to retreat due to fierce artillery fire from German 10.5 cm leFH 18 guns. The last British forces fought off the Germans in the dark with Bren light machine guns and hand grenades, while they retreated further north towards Dombås.

In the year 2000, the municipal council granted the village of Otta town status which is mostly symbolic as there are no longer any special privileges under the law with such as designation any more in Norway.

== Economy ==
Otta is a largely an industrial town, having a number of factories including a window framing plant, production of a high quality slate, wood mill, and a large printing plant. The town also has many other trades and services present in addition to its industrial base.

== Attractions ==
Otta is used as a base for day trips into the nearby Rondane National Park and Jotunheimen National Park. Having a hotel, a number of camping sites, and the so-called mountain hotels located near Mysusæter, the town attracts many tourists each year. Other points of interests include Kvitskriupresten and the Milorg hideout of Reiret, as well as a monument commemorating the Battle of Kringen in 1612.

== See also ==
- List of towns and cities in Norway
- Otta seal pavement
