= Otta (river) =

River in Innlandet, Norway

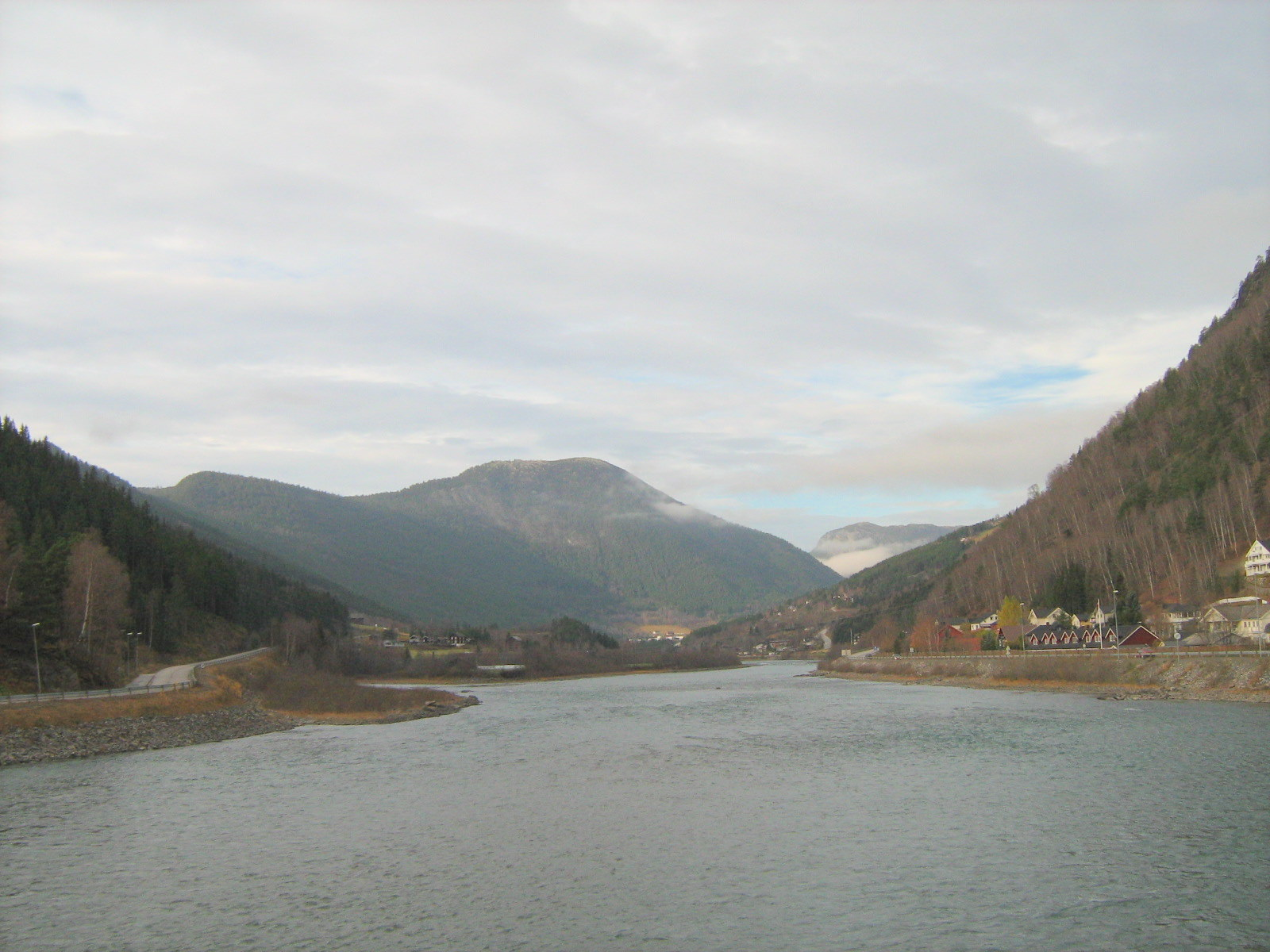
- The Otta River near the town of Otta

Location
- Country: Norway
- County: Innlandet
- Municipalities: Skjåk, Lom, Vågå, and Sel

Physical characteristics
- Source: Djupvatnet lake
  - location: Stranda, Norway
  - coordinates: 62°01′29″N 7°19′21″E
  - elevation: 1,016 metres (3,333 ft)
- Mouth: Gudbrandsdalslågen
  - location: Otta, Norway
  - coordinates: 61°46′03″N 9°32′39″E
  - elevation: 210 metres (690 ft)
- Length: 147.85 km (91.87 mi)
- Basin size: 4,172 km^{2} (1,611 sq mi)
- Discharge
  - average: 119.7 m^{3}/s (4,230 cu ft/s)

Otta is a river in Innlandet county, Norway. The 147.85-kilometre (91.87 mi) river flows through the Ottadalen valley which includes the municipalities of Skjåk, Lom, Vågå, and Sel. The watershed of the Otta drains an area of 4,172 square kilometres (1,611 mi^{2}) beginning in the Breheimen mountains and emptying into the large river Gudbrandsdalslågen. The Otta River is known for rafting. The rafting season begins in mid-May and lasts until the end of September. The Norwegian National Road 15 runs along the river for almost its entire course.

== Course ==
The river technically begins at the lake Djupvatnet in Stranda Municipality which is in Vestland county, about 1.5 kilometres (0.93 mi) west of the border with Skjåk Municipality in Innlandet county. The river flows through the Billingsdalen valley heading to the east, including through several lakes including the Breiddalsvatnet, Skim, and Vågåvatn. After the Vågåvatn lake at Vågåmo, it enters the Ottadalen valley and heads to the southeast to the town of Otta in Sel Municipality. At Otta, the river joins the large river Gudbrandsdalslågen.

== Name ==
The name of the river is probably derived from the Old Norse verb ótta which is the genitive case of ótti which means to "scare" or "terrify". The water of the river comes from glaciers, and the flooding of the river can be strong and fierce.

== Media gallery ==
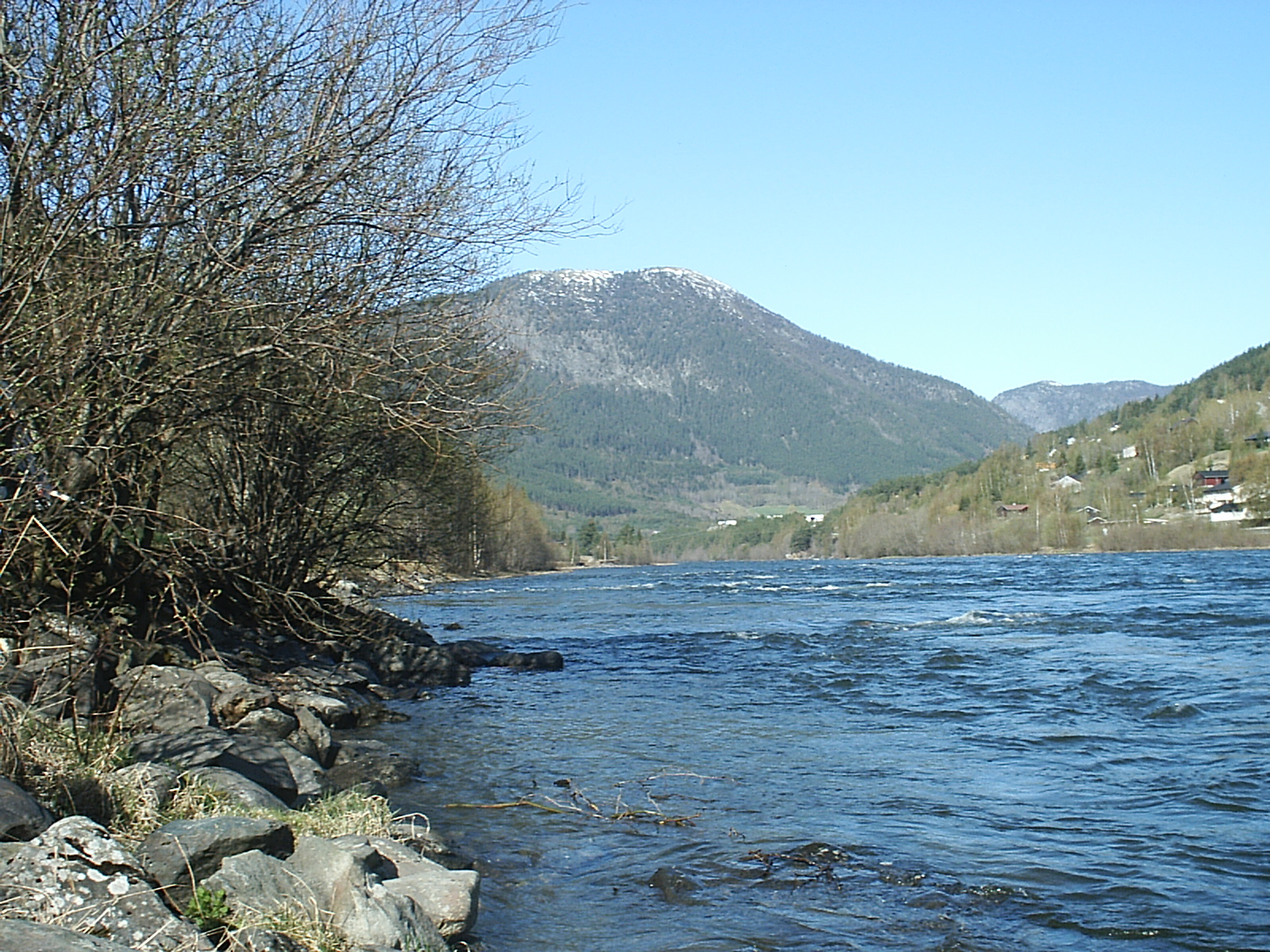
Otta River.

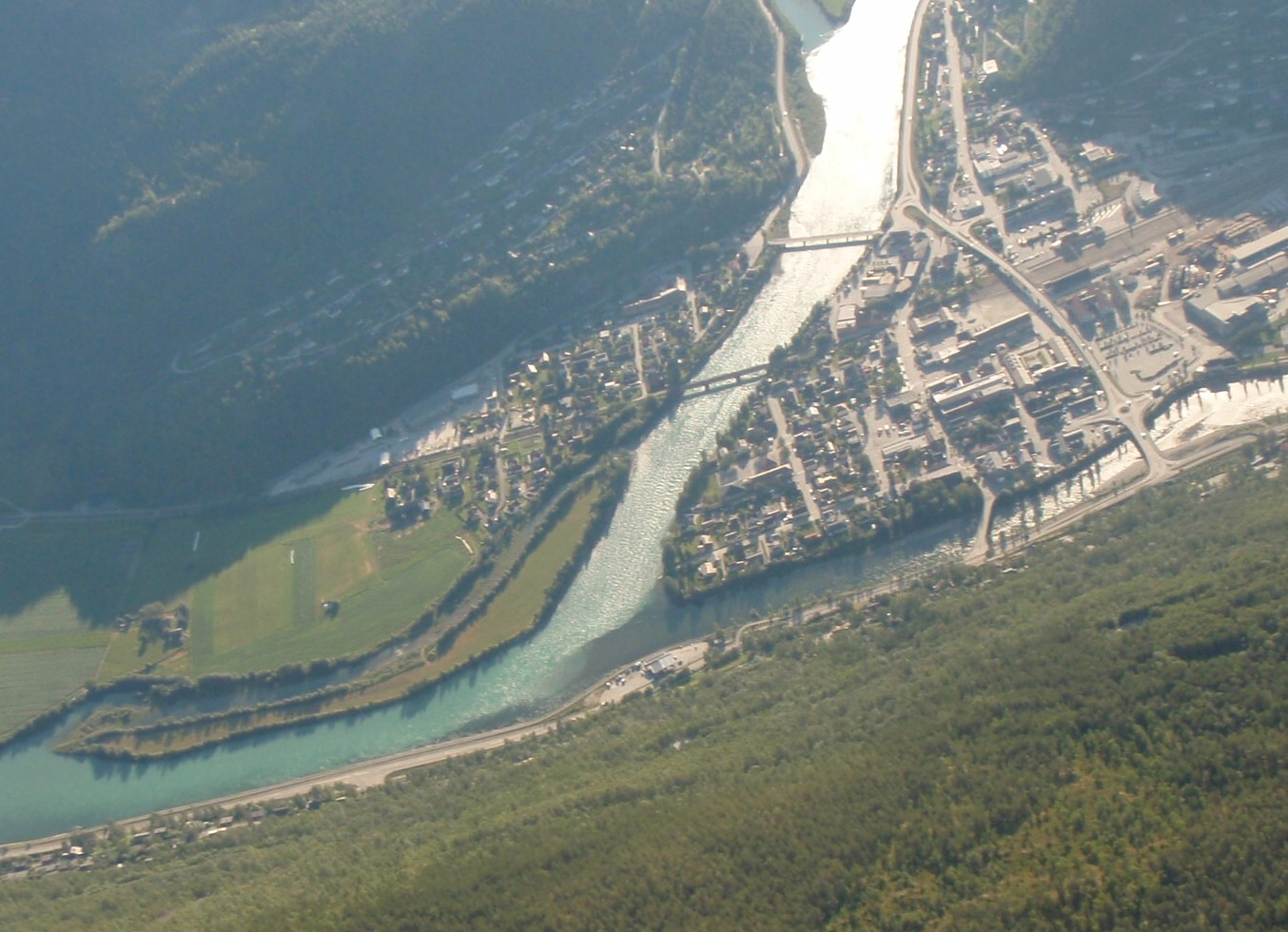
Aerial view of the Otta River.

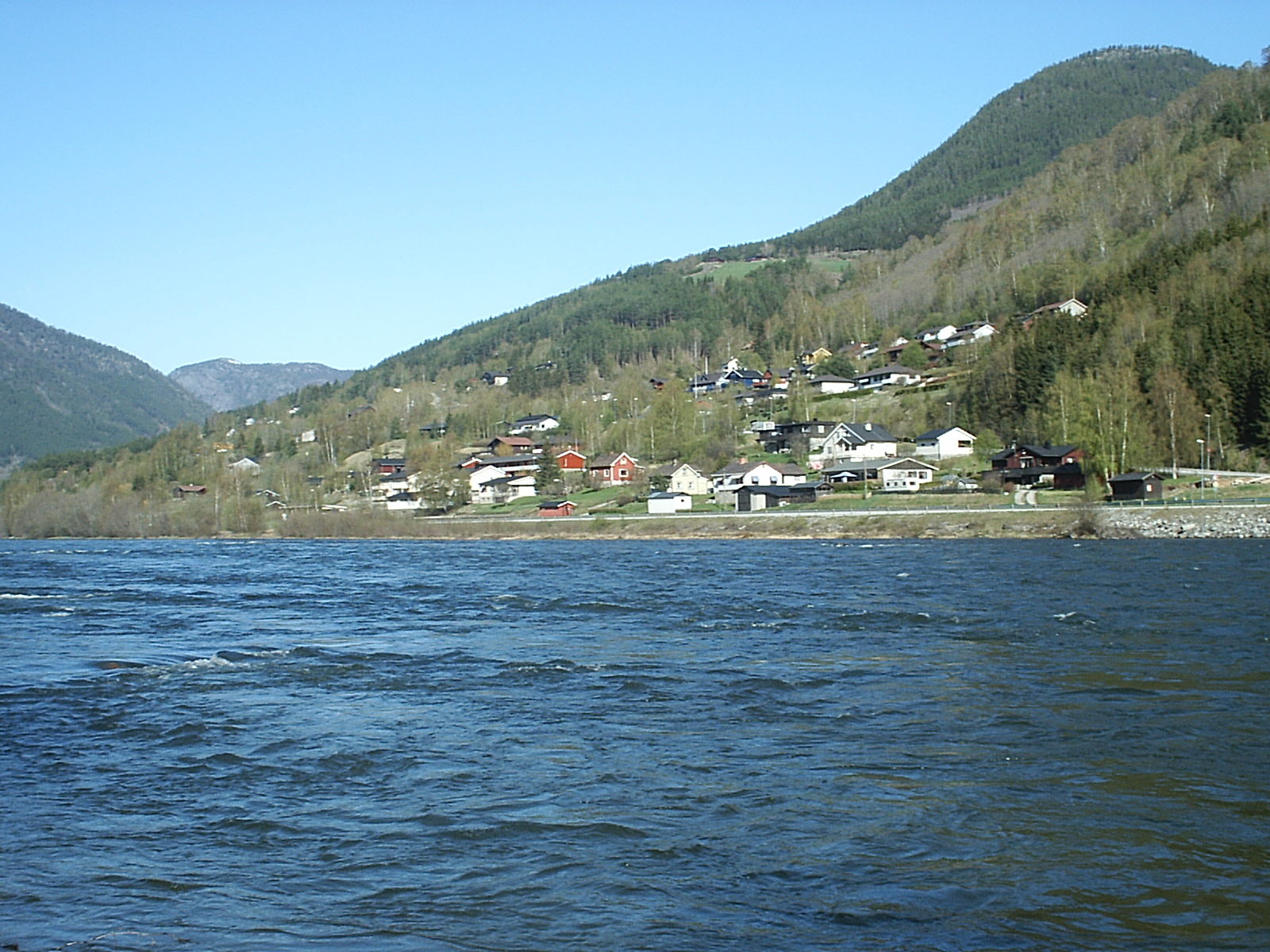
In front of Otta.

== See also ==
- List of rivers in Norway
