= Ottadalen =

River in Innlandet, Norway

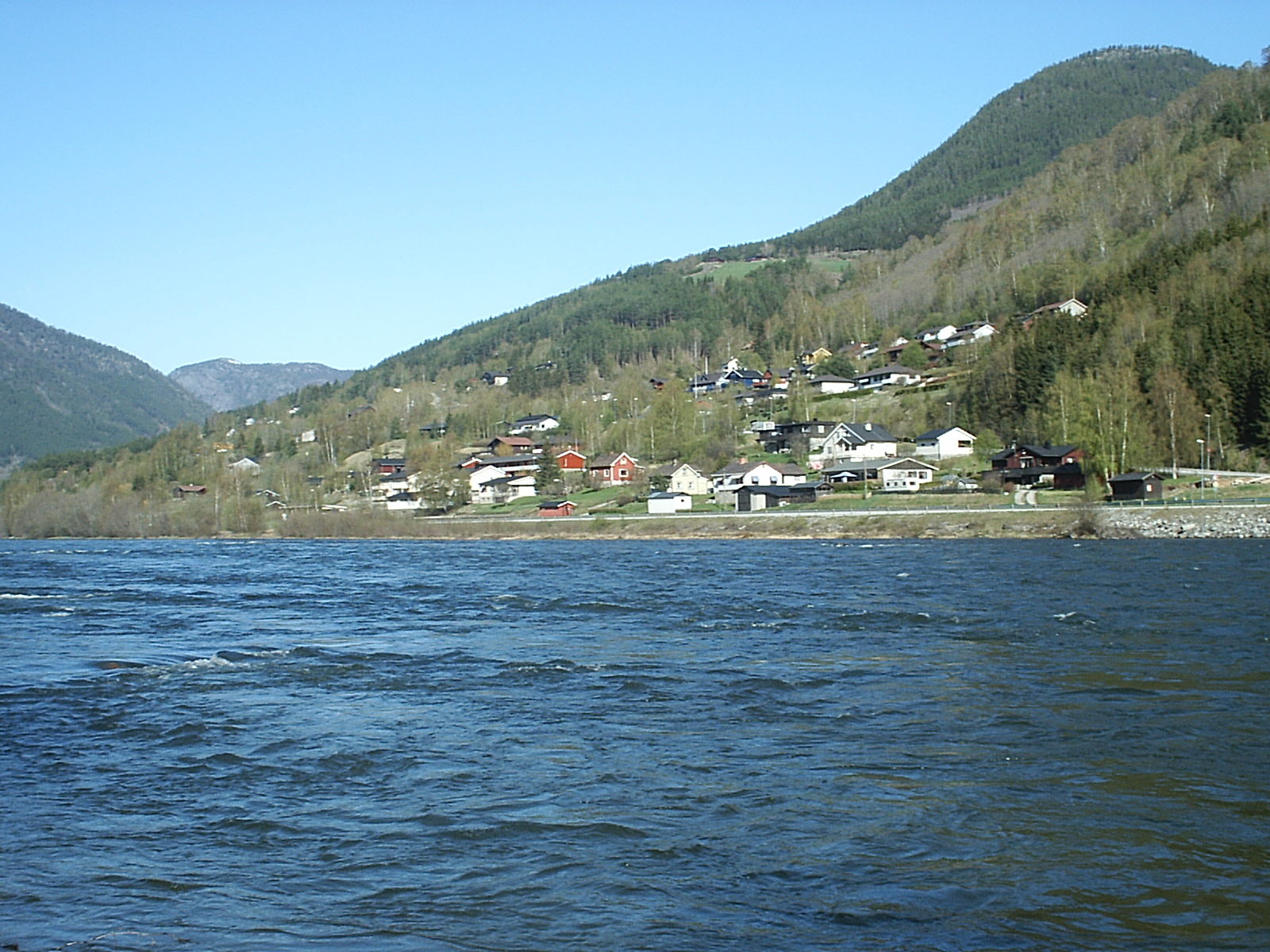
- The Otta River at the town of Otta
- Long-axis direction: E-W

Geology
- Type: River valley

Geography
- Location: Innlandet, Norway
- Coordinates: 61.79435°N 9.29795°E

Location
- Interactive map of the valley

Ottadalen (English: Otta Valley) is a valley in the municipalities of Skjåk, Lom, Vågå, and Sel in Innlandet county, Norway.

The Otta River flows through the valley. The Otta River begins in the municipality of Skjåk and flows into lake Vågåvatnet. Exiting Vågåvatnet at Vågåmo, it continues its journey through the valley, leaving the municipality of Vågå to meet the Gudbrandsdalslågen river at the town of Otta in Sel Municipality.

Reinheimen National Park, which consists of much of the Tafjordfjella mountain range, includes the reindeer habitat in the northern part of the Ottadalen valley.

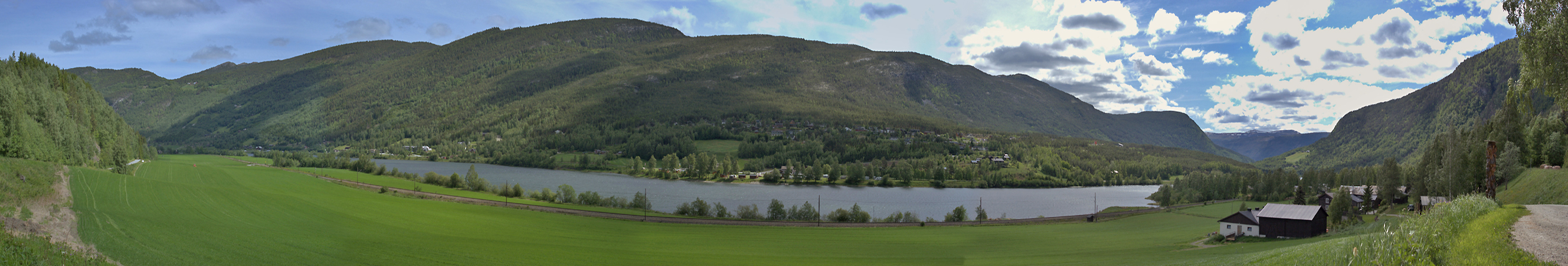
Ottadalen valley

== See also ==
- Otta seal
