= Ringebu (disambiguation) =

Ringebu may refer to:

== Places ==
- Ringebu Municipality, a municipality in Innlandet county, Norway
- Ringebu (village) (also known as Vålebrua), a village in Ringebu municipality in Innlandet county, Norway
- Ringebu Stave Church, a church in Ringebu municipality in Innlandet county, Norway
- Ringebu Station, a railway station in Ringebu municipality in Innlandet county, Norway
