= Brekkom =

Village in Ringebu, Norway

- Village
- Interactive map of Brekkom
- Location within Innlandet Location within Norway
- Coordinates: 61.4701°N 10.22493°E
- Country: Norway
- Region: Eastern Norway
- County: Innlandet
- District: Gudbrandsdalen
- Municipality: Ringebu Municipality
- Elevation: 587 m (1,926 ft)
- Time zone: UTC+01:00 (CET)
  - Summer (DST): UTC+02:00 (CEST)
- Post Code: 2634 Fåvang

Brekkom is a village in Ringebu Municipality in Innlandet county, Norway. The village is located in the Gudbrandsdal valley, on a mountainside about 3 kilometres (1.9 mi) above the village of Fåvang which sits on the shore of the river Gudbrandsdalslågen.
