= Fåvang Stave Church =

Church in Innlandet, Norway

Fåvang Church
- Fåvang stavkyrkje
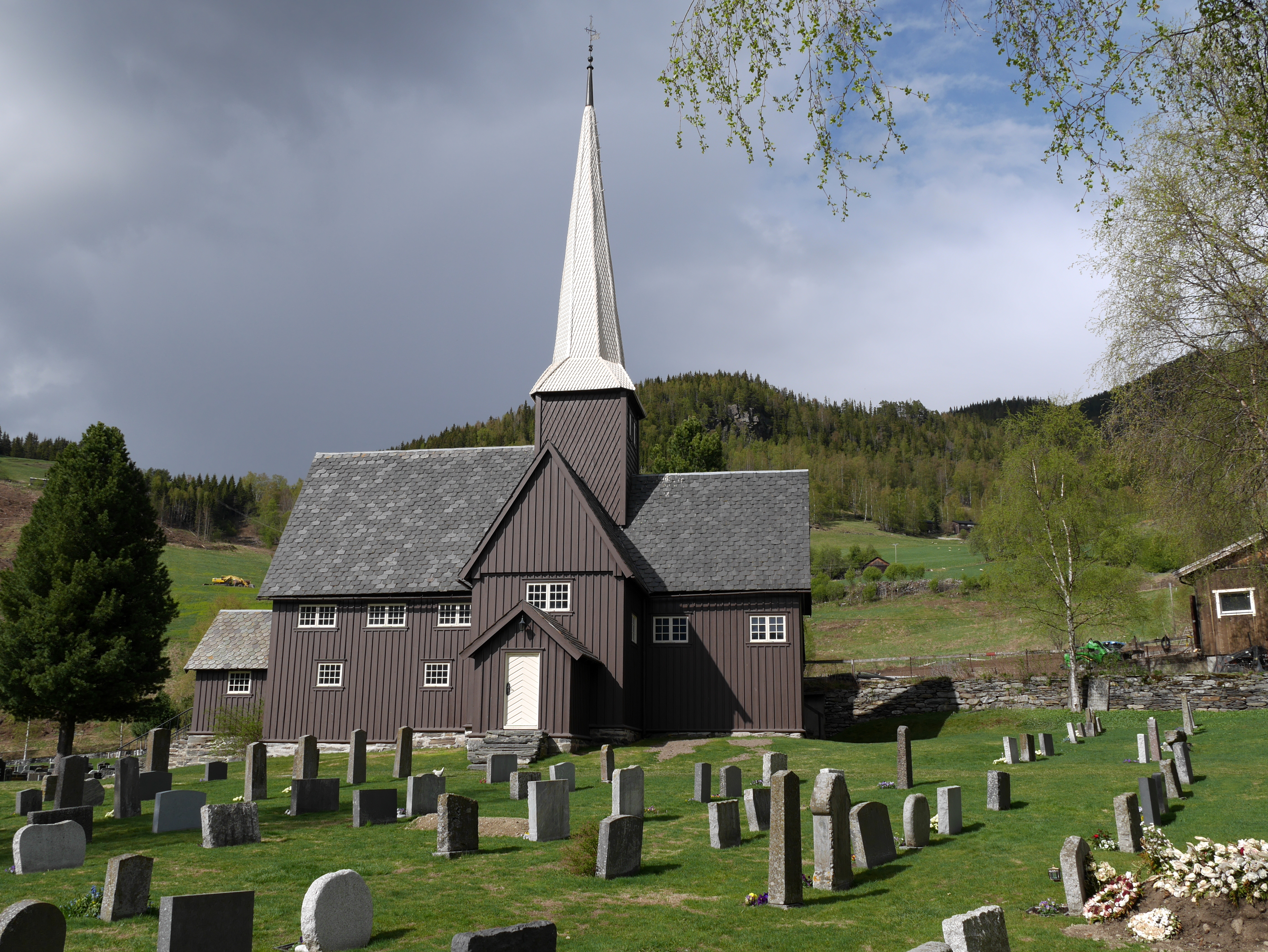
- View of the church
- Fåvang Church
- 61°25′38″N 10°13′13″E
- Location: Ringebu Municipality, Innlandet
- Country: Norway
- Denomination: Church of Norway
- Previous denomination: Catholic Church
- Churchmanship: Evangelical Lutheran

History
- Status: Parish church
- Founded: 13th century
- Consecrated: 1630

Architecture
- Functional status: Active
- Architectural type: Cruciform
- Completed: 1630 (396 years ago)

Specifications
- Capacity: 170
- Materials: Wood

Administration
- Diocese: Hamar bispedømme
- Deanery: Sør-Gudbrandsdal prosti
- Parish: Fåvang
- Norwegian Cultural Heritage Site
- Type: Church
- Status: Automatically protected
- ID: 84225

Fåvang Stave Church (Norwegian: Fåvang stavkyrkje) is a parish church of the Church of Norway in Ringebu Municipality in Innlandet county, Norway. It is located just south of the village of Fåvang. It is the main church for the Fåvang parish which is part of the Sør-Gudbrandsdal prosti (deanery) in the Diocese of Hamar. The brown, wooden church was built in a cruciform design in the year 1630 using plans drawn up by the architect Werner Olsen. The church seats about 170 people.

== History ==
The first church in Fåvang was built as a wooden stave church in the late 13th century on the present site of the church (some records state that the church first was built on another site, but there is no conclusive evidence of this). This stave church was a wooden long church.

During the period 1627–1630, Fåvang church was just about completely rebuilt as well as enlarged. A nearby 11th-century stave church was recently torn down and the materials from that old church plus materials from the old Fåvang Stave Church were reused in the rebuilding of the Fåvang Stave Church. Consequently, the oldest materials of the present church can date back to about 1150–1250. According to tradition, the reconstruction was supervised by master-builder Werner Olsen (ca. 1600–1682), who was also responsible for reconstruction of Ringebu Stave Church and Lom Stave Church. During this period of rebuilding, the staves were removed and it was reconstructed as a timber-framed building with a cruciform floor plan.

The church has a number of historic furnishings. Among other things the church has votives from 1684 to 1694. The altar and pulpit are of Renaissance style, both dated to the 17th century. A painting of the Christ Child is from 1732.

The church has been through several reconstructions. In 1900–1901, the church received new exterior siding and the church porch were rebuilt and enlarged. At that time, the church was painted white. From 1949 to 1951, the church was again restored, this time under the direction of architect Jens Gram Dunker. The windows were replaced and many of the interior furnishings were changed. The church was re-consecrated on 9 September 1951. Because it has been so extensively modified over the centuries, it is often called a stave church, but it is not always counted among the true, historic Norwegian stave churches.

== Media gallery ==
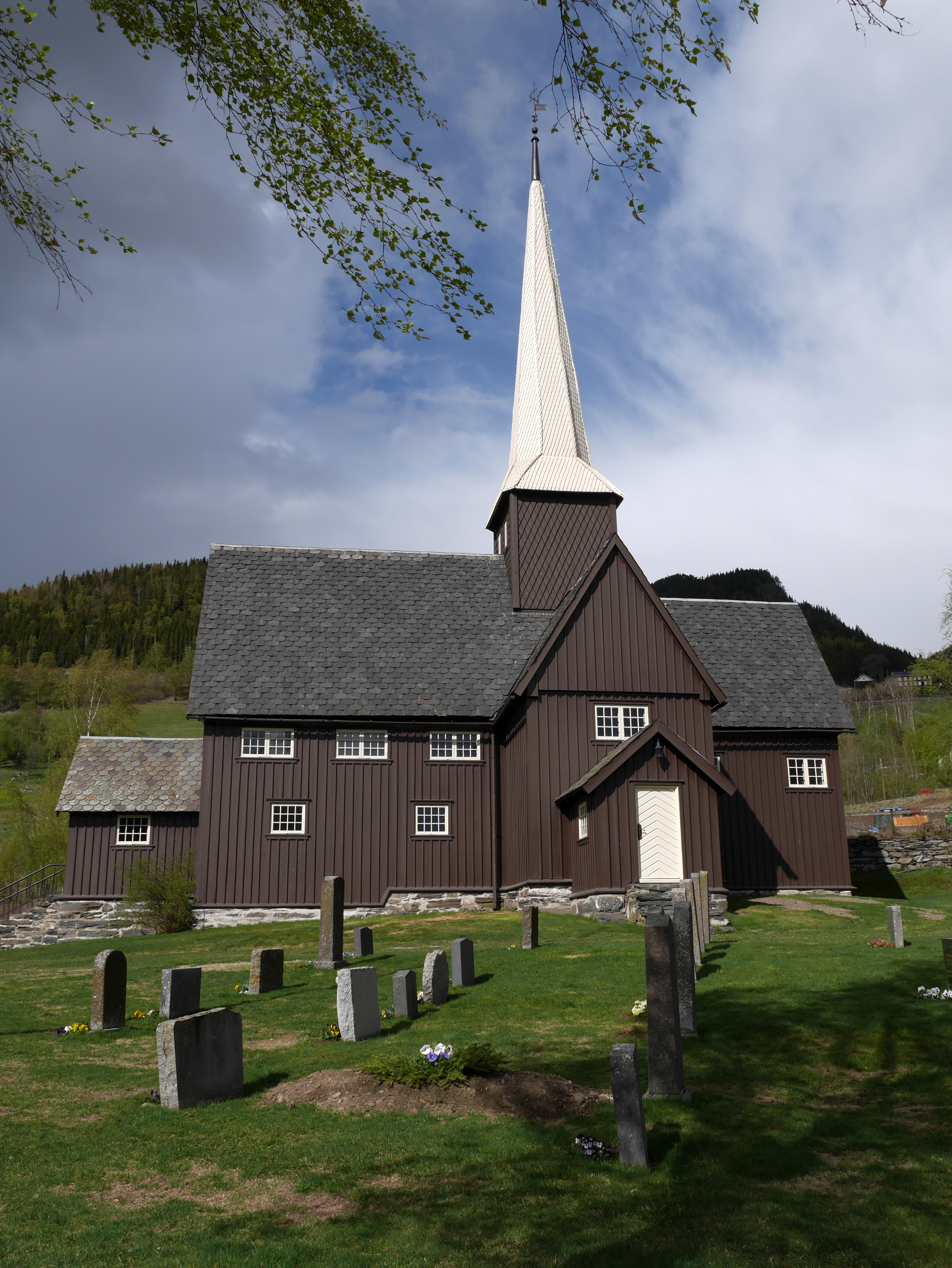

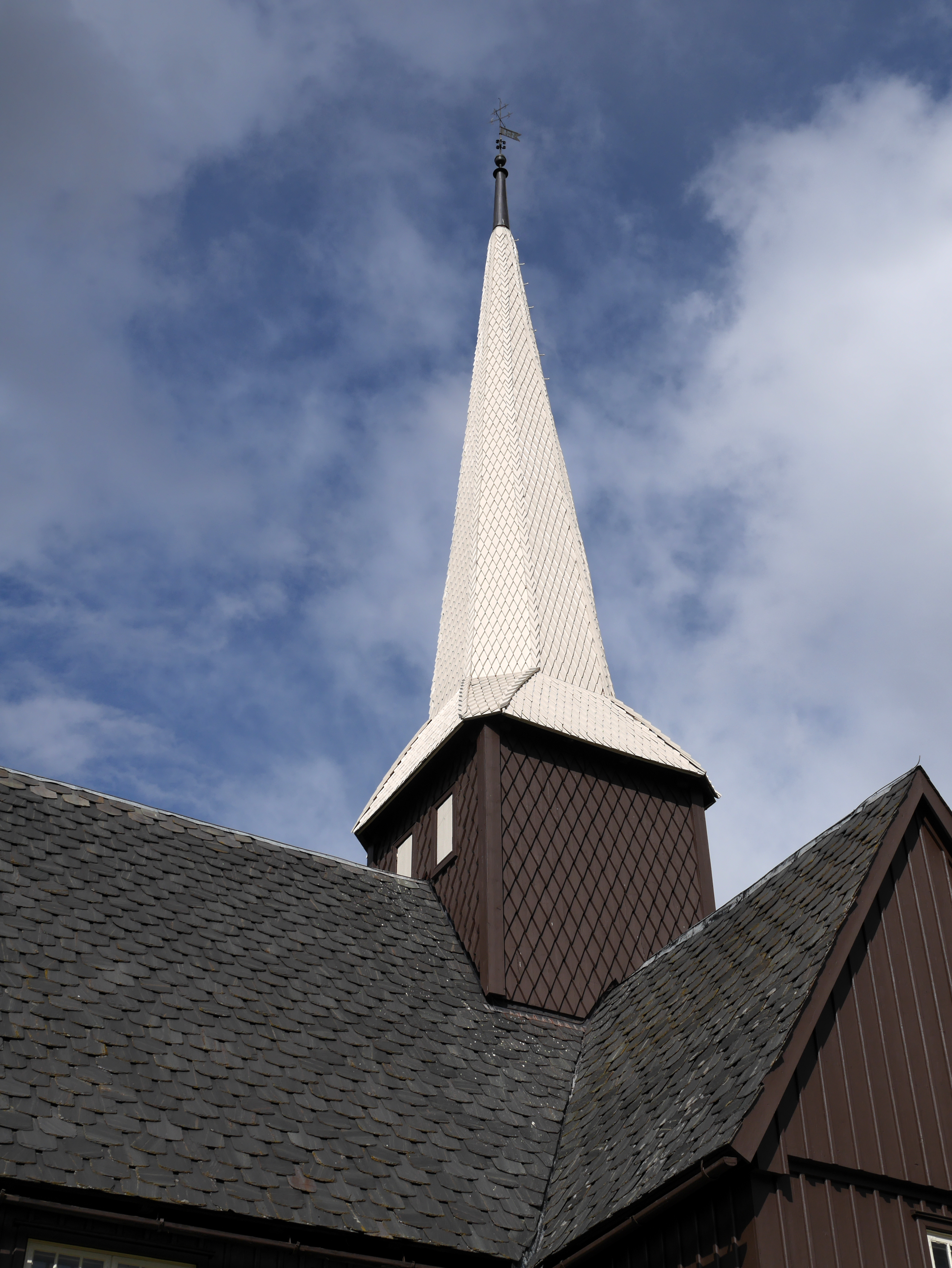

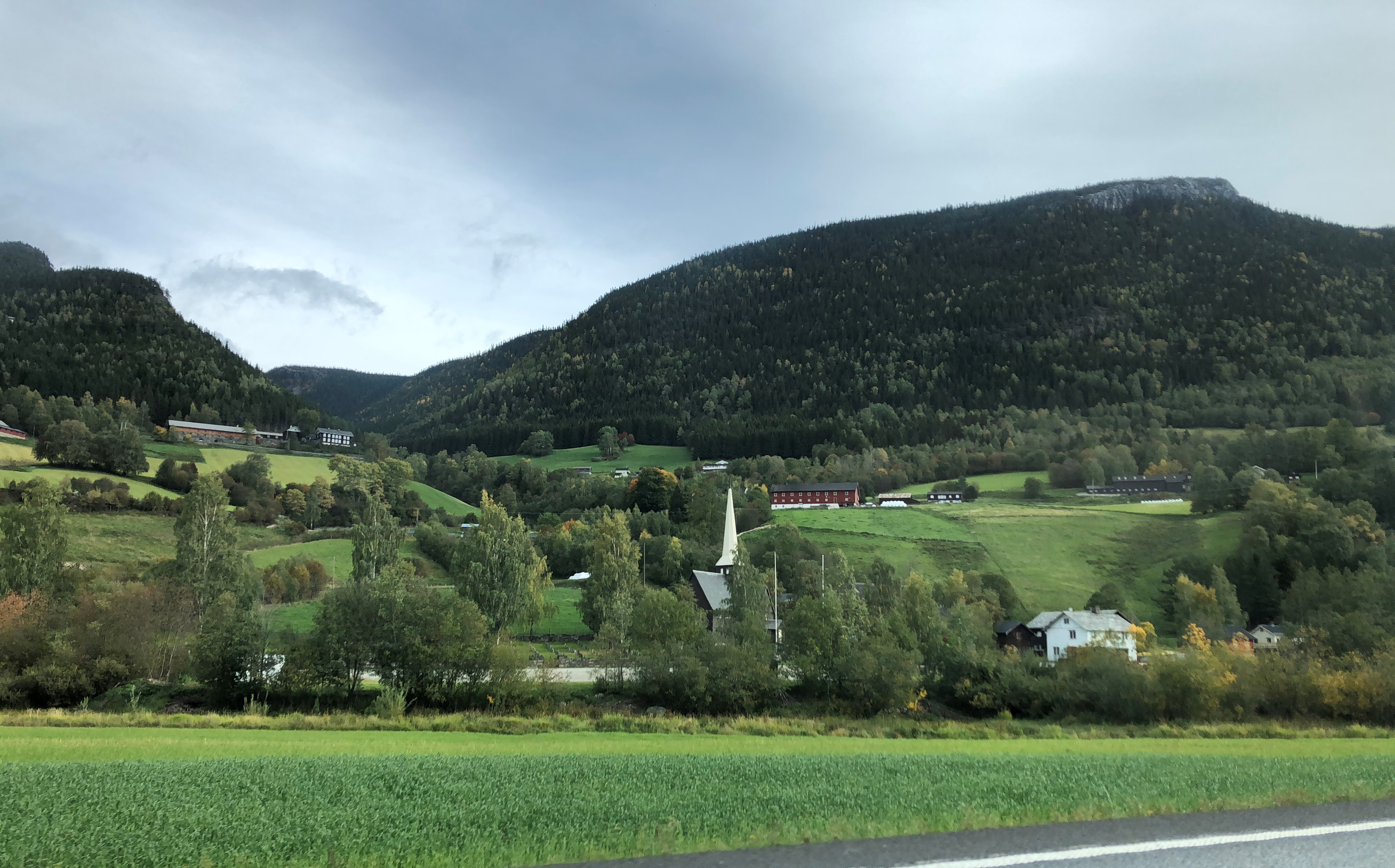

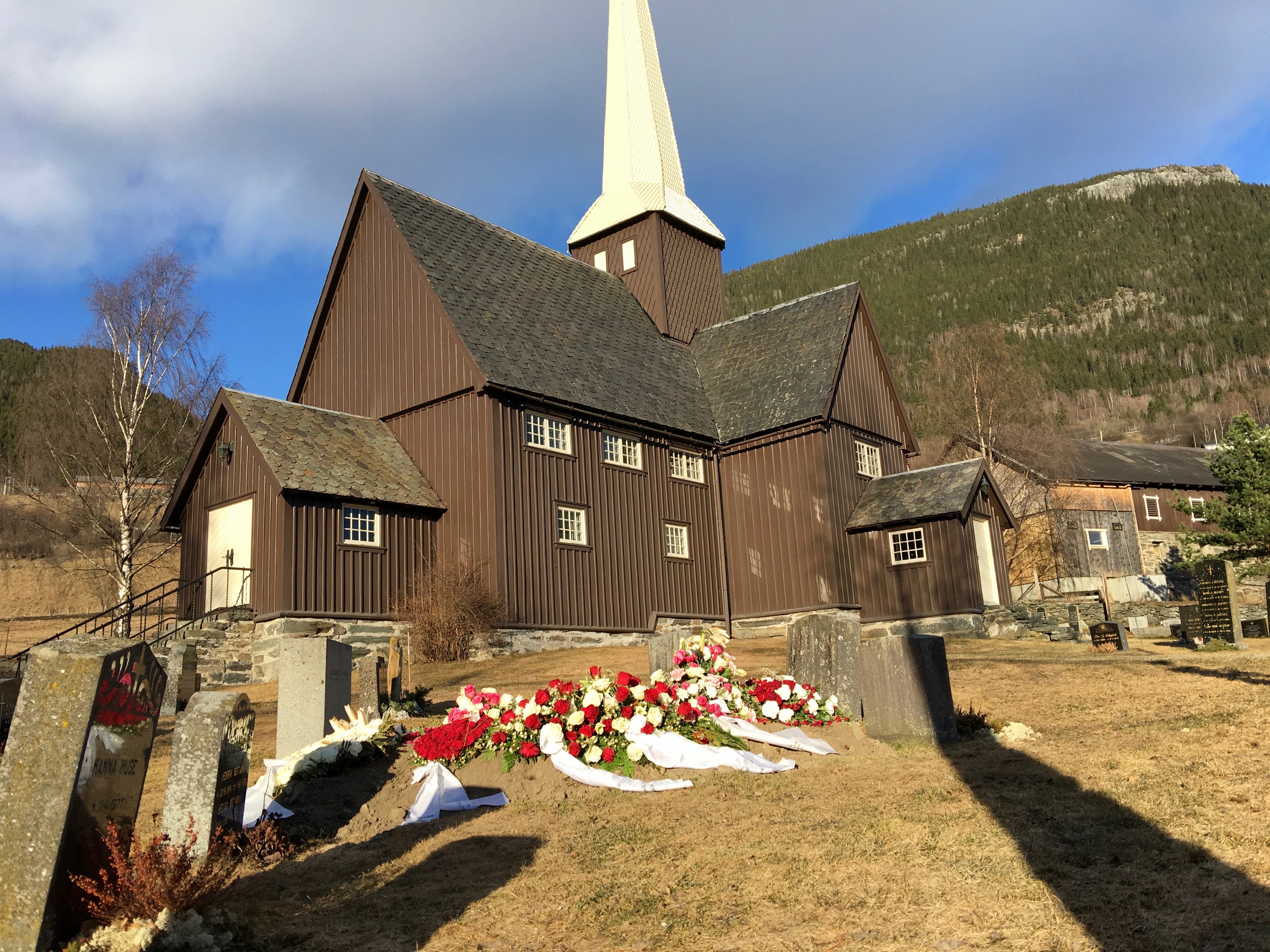

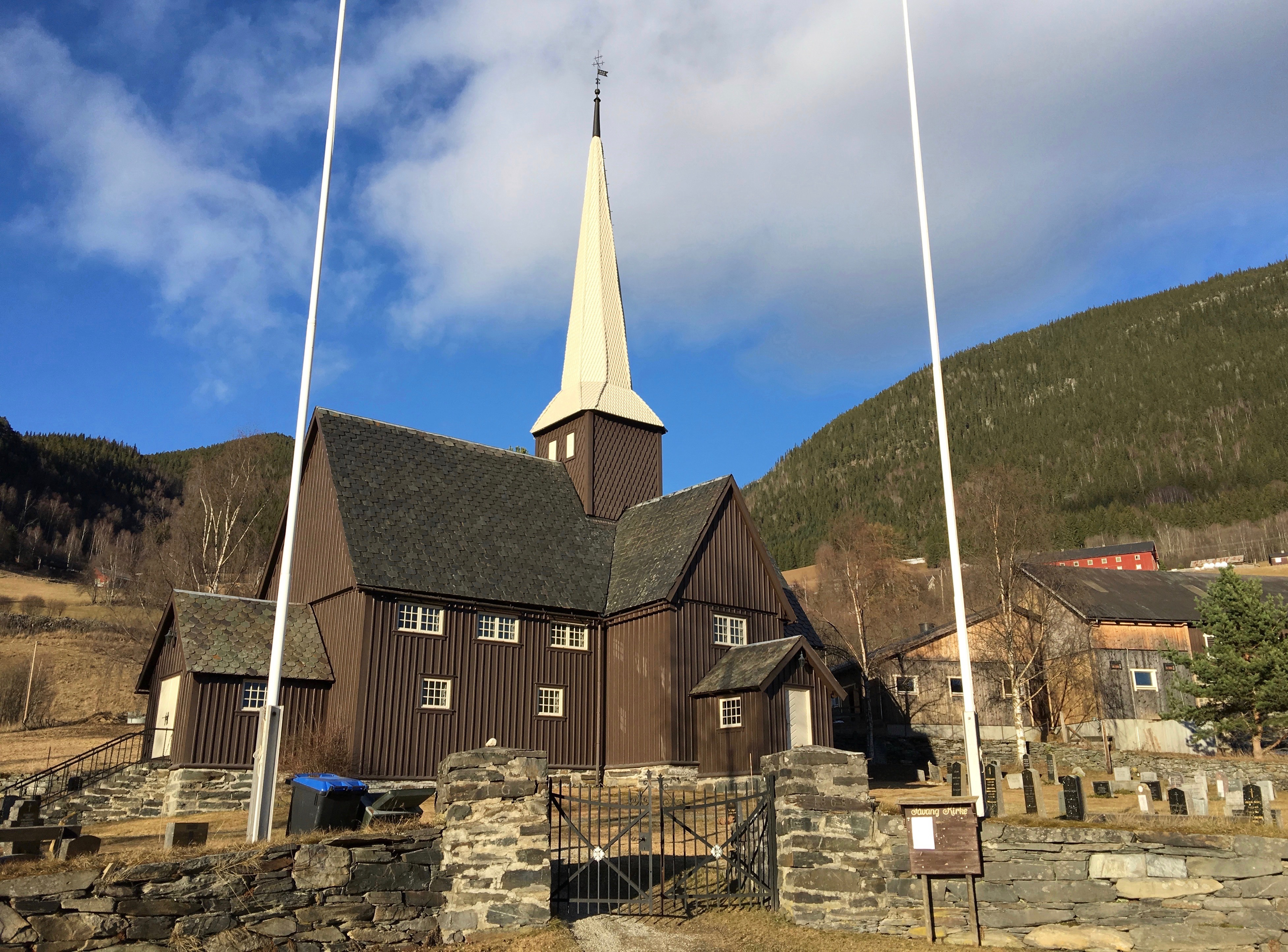

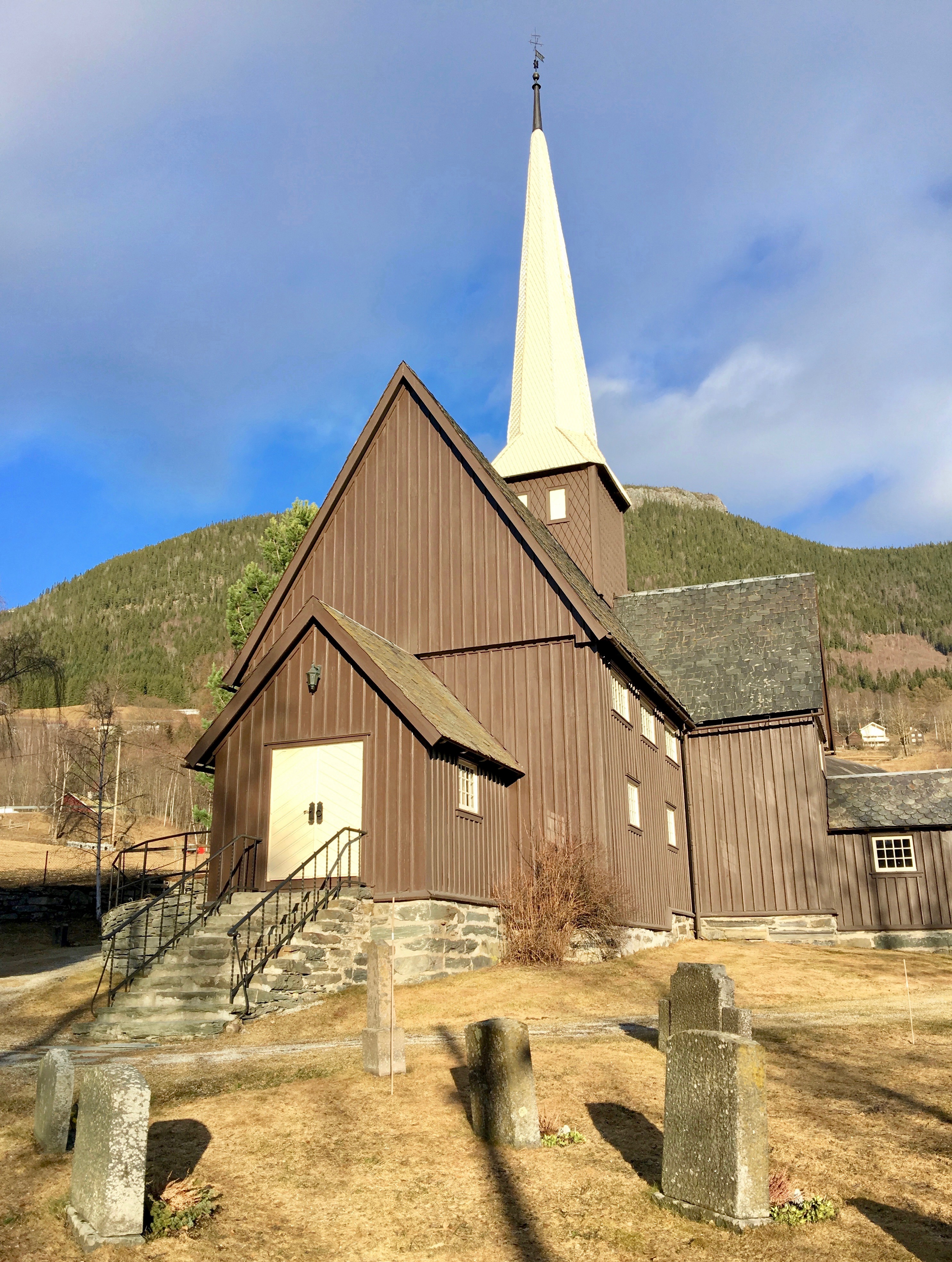

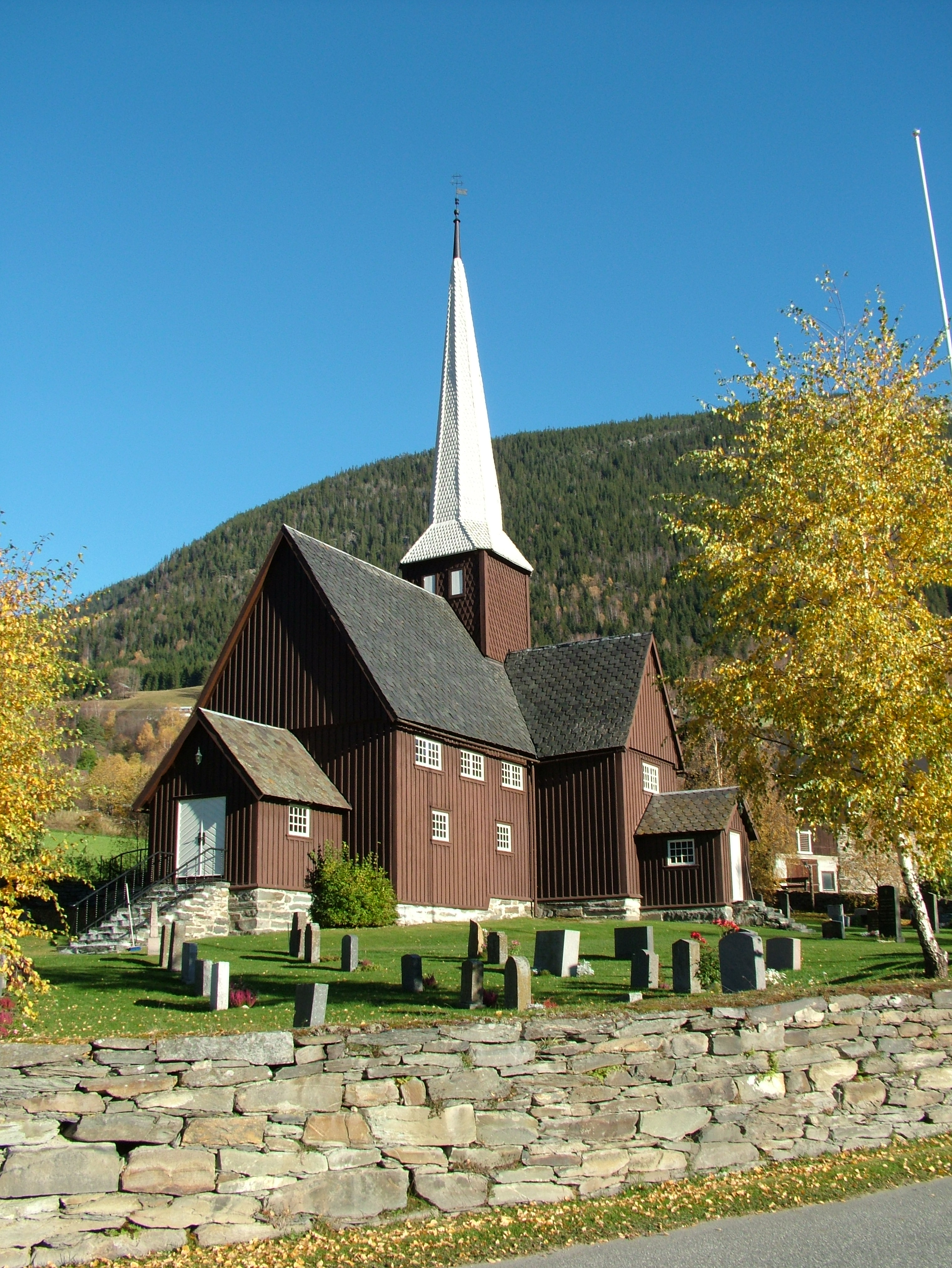

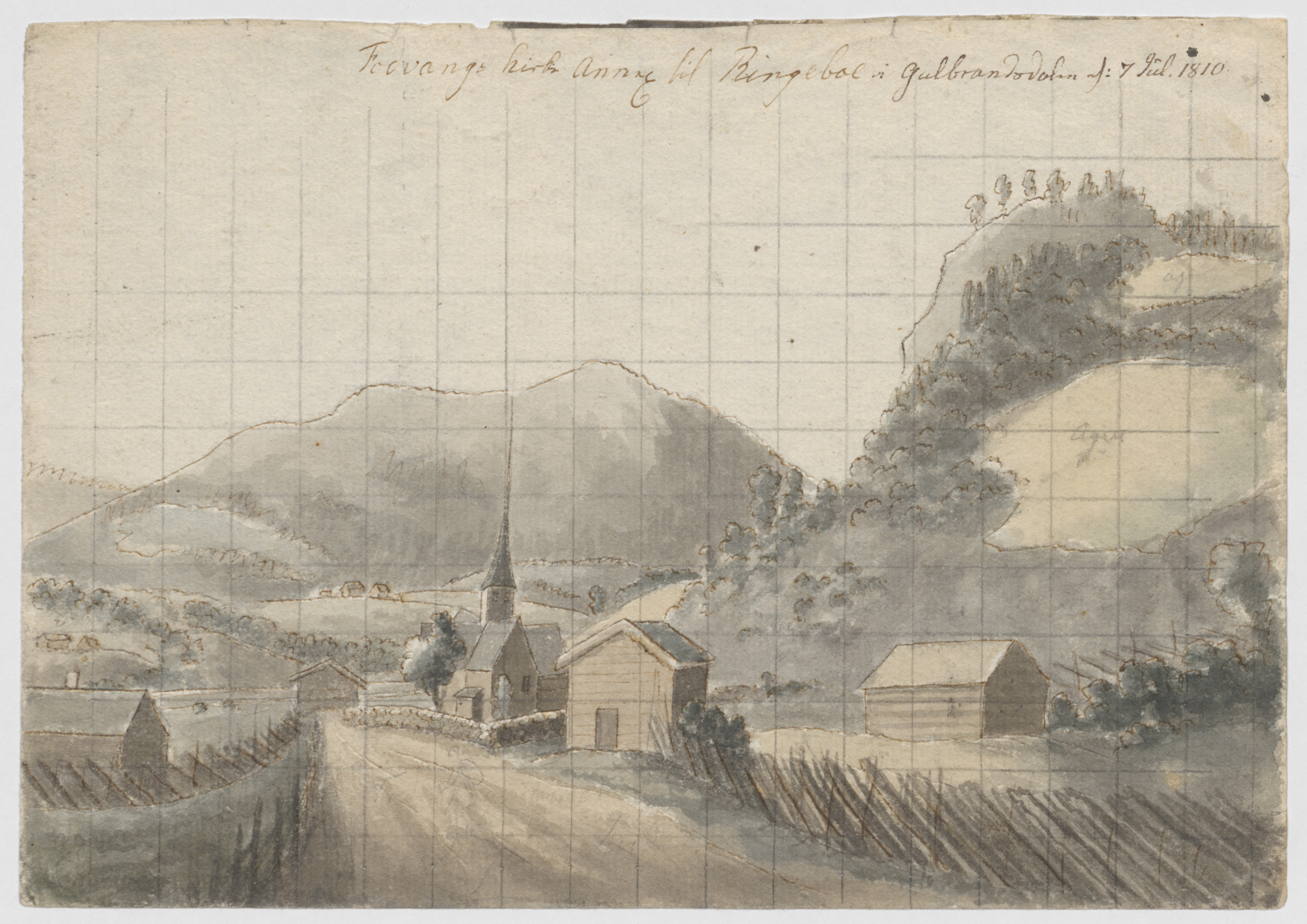
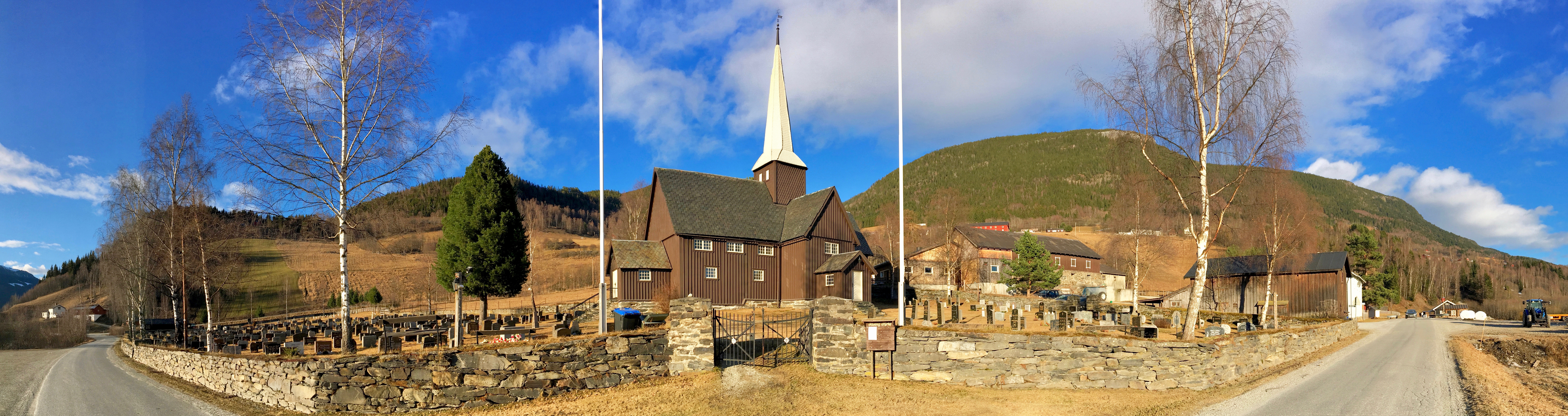
Wide screen view of the church

== See also ==
- List of churches in Hamar
