= Jehans Nordbu =

Jehans Persson Nordbu (1768–c.1860), also Johannes Nordboe, was a Norwegian-American immigrant to the United States and an early settler in the state of Texas.

Jehans Persson Nordbu was born at Ringebu in Christians amt (county), Norway. He was the son of Peder Nordboe and Abelone Engebretsdatter. He and his family resided on the Nordbu farm in the parish of Venabygd.

In 1832 when Jehans Nordbu was 64 years, he and his family, including his wife and four children immigrated to the United States. Nordbu arrived in the Fox River Norwegian Settlement in LaSalle County, Illinois in 1836. In 1837, the family started for Shelby County, Missouri. The Nordbu family settled in Texas about 1841. This was one of the first family from the traditional region of Gudbrandsdalen to emigrate to America.

Nordbu died in Tarrant County, Texas when he was over ninety years of age.

Nordbu sent many letters home to Norway. In 1837, Nordbu wrote an article for Statsborgeren. En tidende for Norges, a Norwegian periodical which was edited by Henrik Wergeland. In this article Nordbu labeled the United States a "free country".

In 1975, Nordbu's portrait was published by Einar Hovdhaugen in his book Frå Venabygd til Texas. Pioneren Jehans Nordbu.

== Other sources ==
- Hovdhaugen, Einar (1975). Fra Venabygd til Texas: Pioneren Jehans Nordbu (in Norwegian). Oslo: Det Norske Samlaget. ISBN 9788252104882.
- Syversen, Odd Magnar (1982). Norge I Texas: Et Bidrag Til Norsk Emigrasjonshistorie (in Norwegian). Stange Historiela. ISBN 9788271040970.
