= Frederik Petersen =

Norwegian painter (1759–1825)

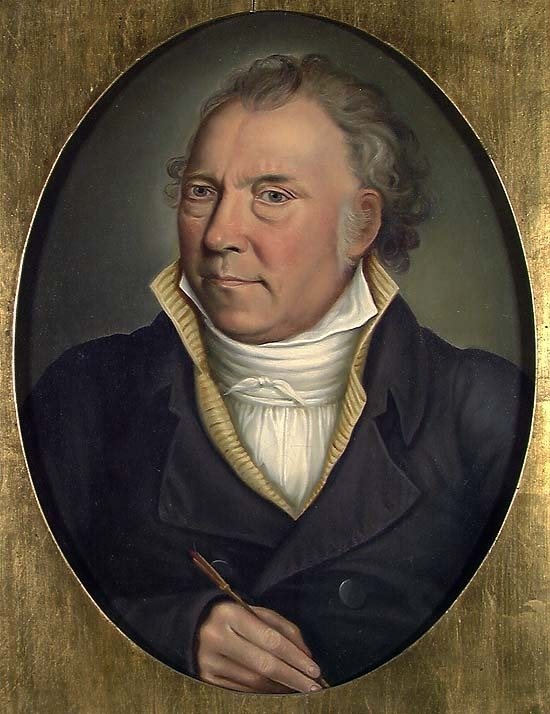
Self-portrait (c.1810/20)

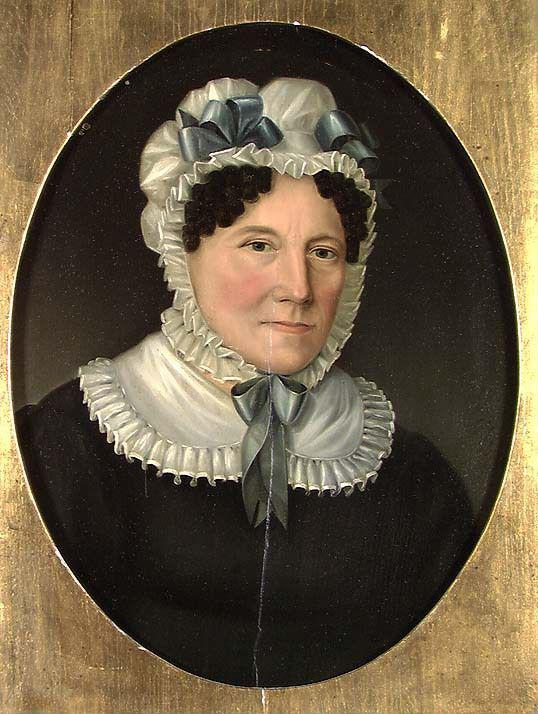
Portrait of the artist's wife (1815-20)

Frederik Kastrud Petersen (9 November 1759 – 22 August 1825) was a Norwegian painter known primarily for his portraits.

== Biography ==
Petersen was born at Ringebu in Kristians amt (county), Norway. His father, Peter Kastrud (1732–1799) was a woodcarver and rosemaler from Faaberg. He received his first art instruction working with his father in Gudbrandsdalen and Østerdalen; learning decorative and figure painting. In 1788, with financial support from Bernt Anker, he was able to go to Copenhagen and study with Jens Juel at the Royal Danish Academy of Fine Arts. After completing his studies, he returned to Norway, although Juel had advised him to travel abroad. He continued to work for his father and Anker, copied works by the Old Masters, and often stayed in Christiania (now Oslo).

In 1799, he settled in Tønsberg where he took citizenship in 1803. In addition to oil paintings, he did much of what would now be called "handicraft" work, as the concept of painter-as-artist was not yet established in Norway. His social status must have been high, however, because he was one of the citizens who participated in choosing a local representative to serve in the Norwegian Constituent Assembly of 1814.

He moved to Strømsø in 1816 and received citizenship there as a Master Painter in 1821. In addition to his canvases, he did altarpieces at Sør-Fron Church and Sandar Church in Sandefjord. He died during 1825 in Drammen.

== Personal life ==
He was married in 1792 to Siri Olsdatter Bierke (1767–1837). Their son, Peter (1794–1858), also became a portrait painter.
