= Venabygd Church =

Church in Innlandet, Norway

- Venabygd kyrkje
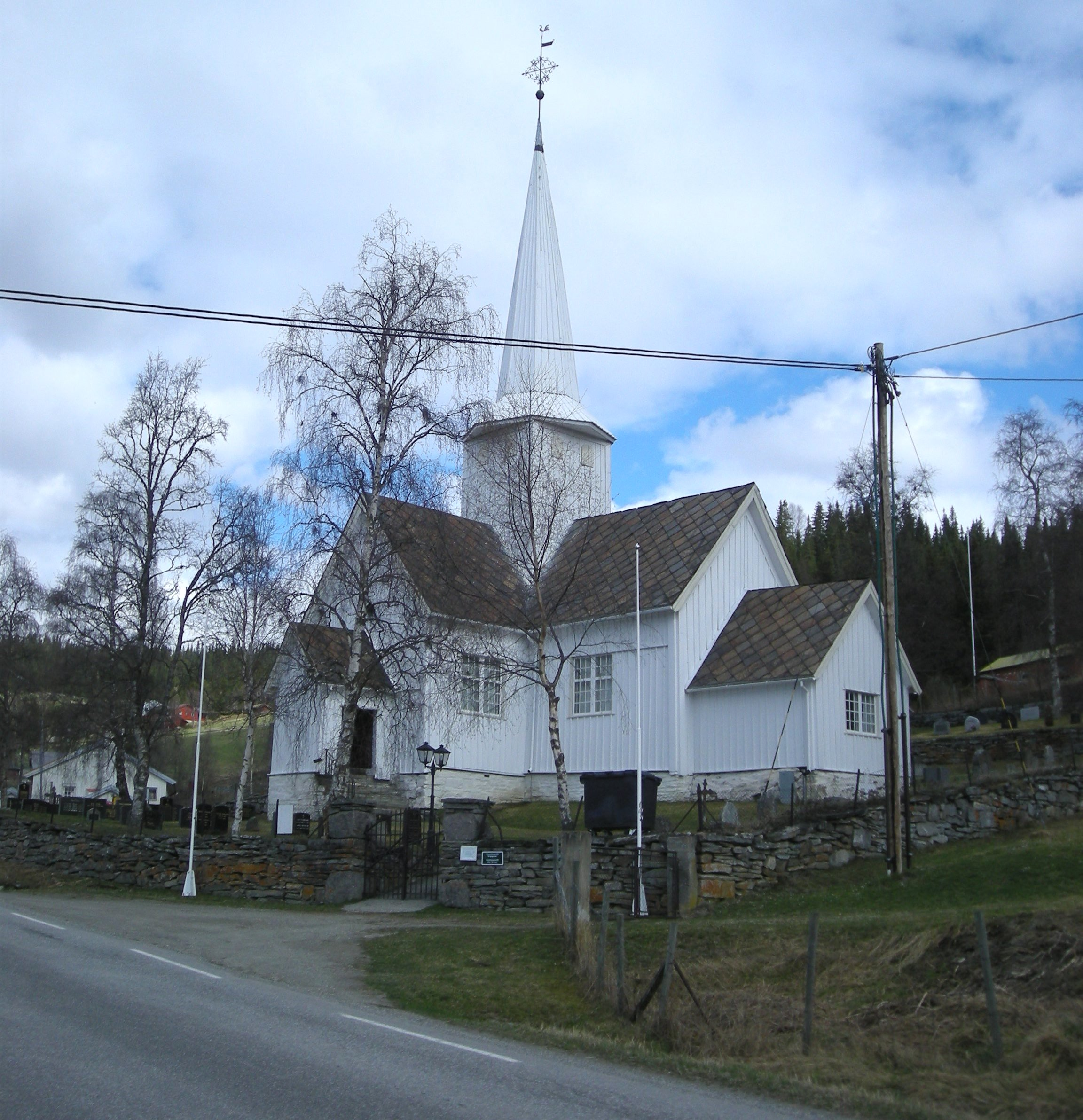
- View of the church
- Venabygd Church
- 61°35′34″N 10°03′09″E
- Location: Ringebu Municipality, Innlandet
- Country: Norway
- Denomination: Church of Norway
- Previous denomination: Catholic Church
- Churchmanship: Evangelical Lutheran

History
- Status: Parish church
- Founded: 13th century
- Consecrated: 1780

Architecture
- Functional status: Active
- Architectural type: Long church
- Completed: 1780 (246 years ago)

Specifications
- Capacity: 170
- Materials: Wood

Administration
- Diocese: Hamar bispedømme
- Deanery: Sør-Gudbrandsdal prosti
- Parish: Venabygd
- Norwegian Cultural Heritage Site
- Type: Church
- Status: Automatically protected
- ID: 85803

Venabygd Church (Norwegian: Venabygd kyrkje) is a parish church of the Church of Norway in Ringebu Municipality in Innlandet county, Norway. It is located in the village of Venabygd. It is the church for the Venabygd parish which is part of the Sør-Gudbrandsdal prosti (deanery) in the Diocese of Hamar. The white, wooden church was built in a cruciform design in 1780 using plans drawn up by an unknown architect. The church seats about 170 people.

== History ==
The first church in Venabygd was probably a wooden stave church what was possibly built in the 13th century (a baptismal font in the current church dates back to this era). There is very little that is known about that church. The historic site of the church was at Lunde, about 500 metres (1,600 ft) northwest of the present site of the church. Historical records allude to the fact that around the year 1580, the church was rebuilt and enlarged by adding two transepts on either side of the nave to create a cruciform design. In 1630, a new floor was laid in the church. In 1686, there was a roof leak that was repaired and church records state that the leak was where the old and new parts of the church were joined (alluding to the fact that the old stave church was enlarged). In 1702, the old church was torn down and a new church was built to replace it. The new church was consecrated on 17 March 1703 by the Bishop Hans Munch. In 1780, a new church was completed on a new site, about 500 metres (1,600 ft) to the southeast of the old church site. The records do not explain why the current church replaced the old one in 1780, less than a century after it was construction. The new church was built as a cruciform building.

== Media gallery ==
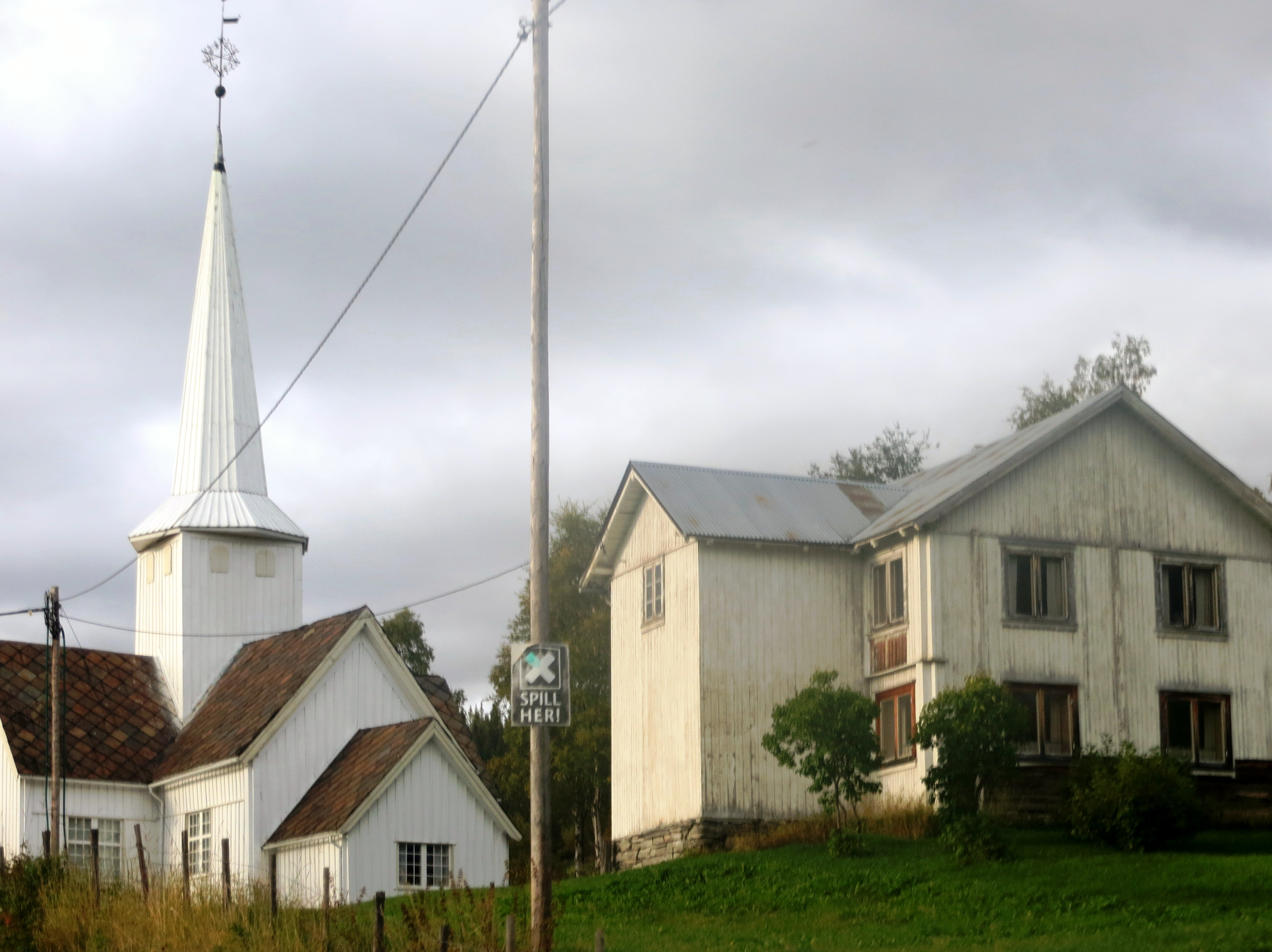

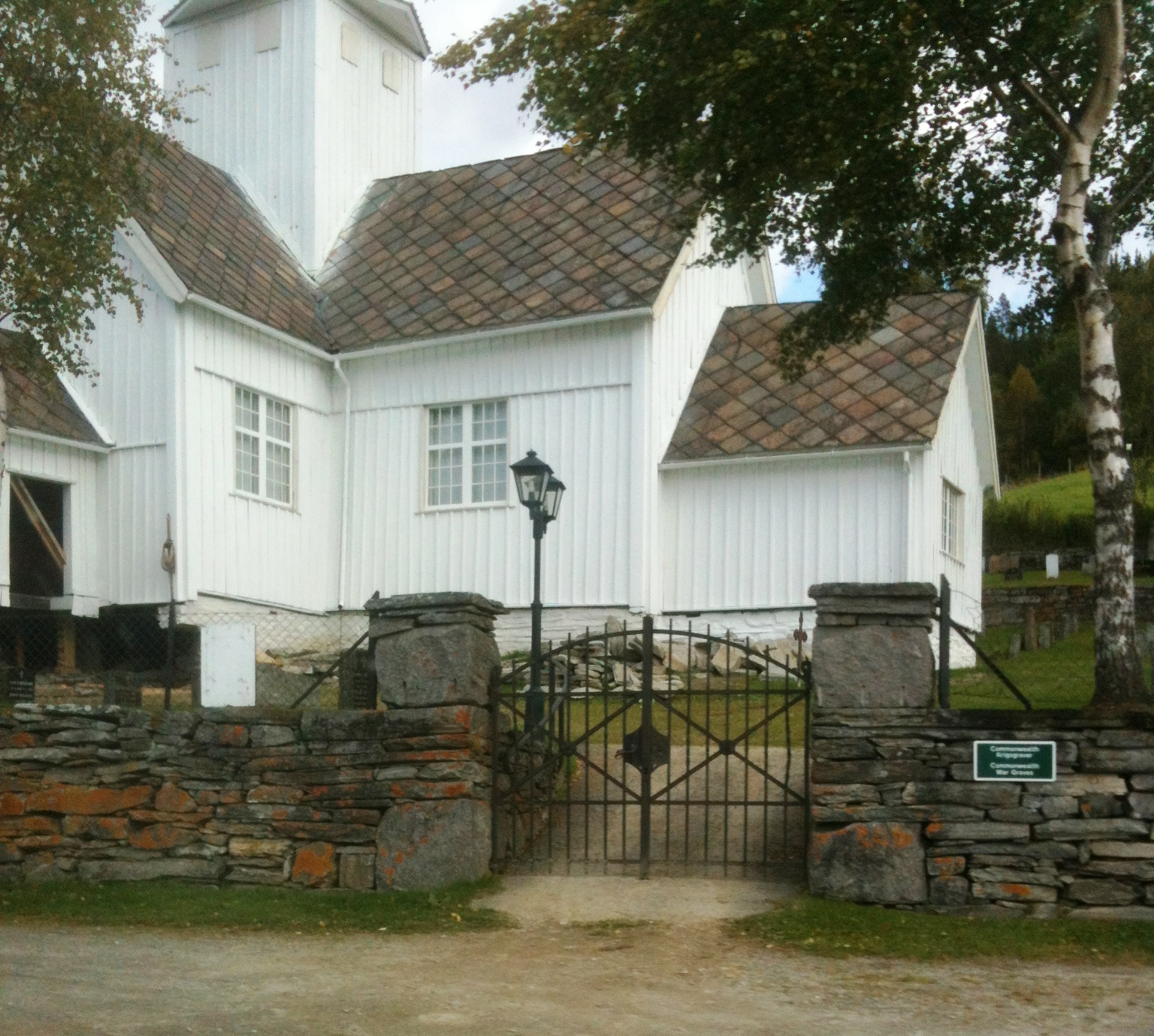

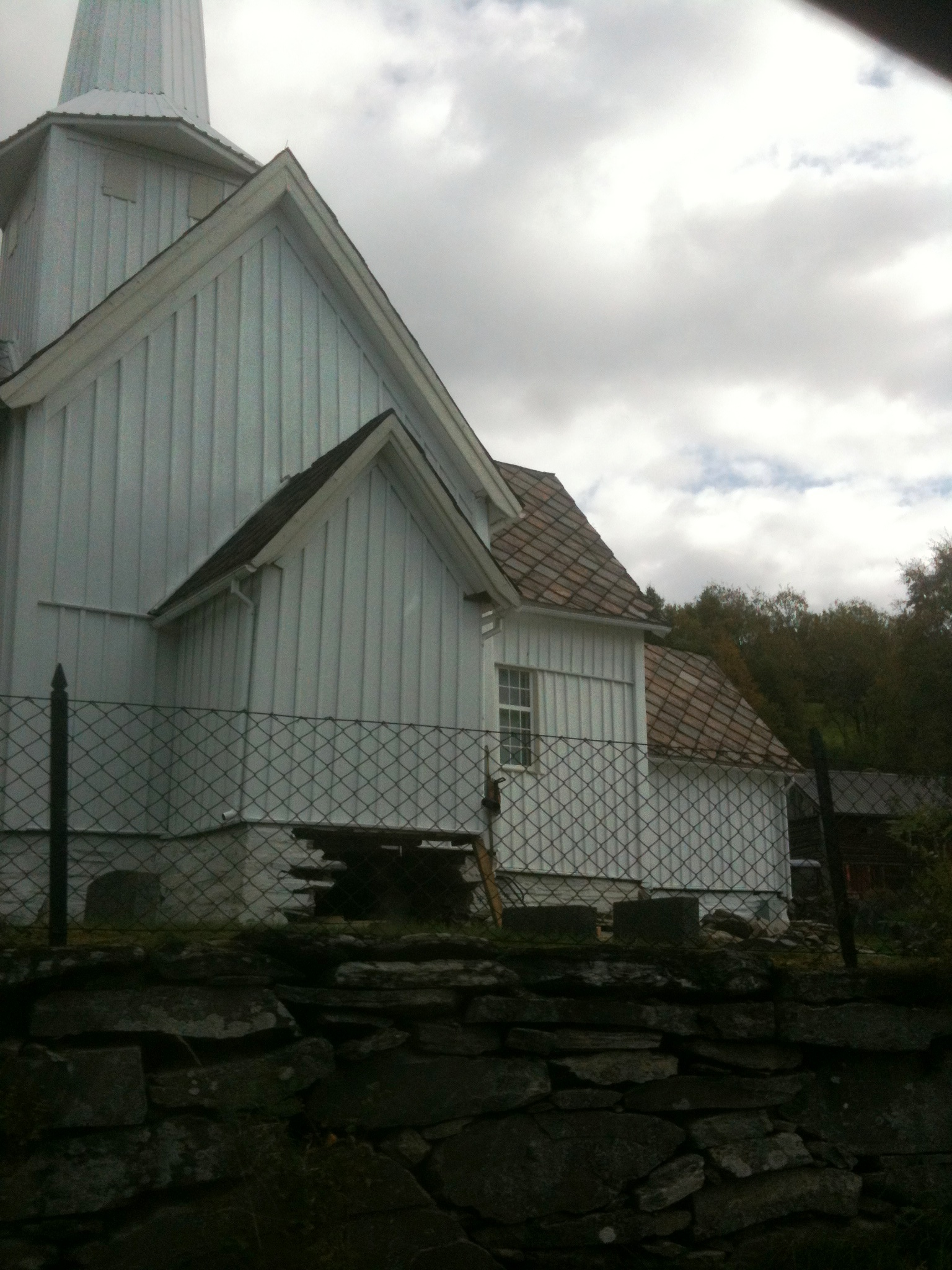

== See also ==
- List of churches in Hamar
