= Emil Nyeng =

Norwegian cross-country skier

Personal information
- Full name: Emil Sjåstad Nyeng
- Nationality: Norway
- Born: 30 April 1991 (age 35) Tromsø, Norway

Sport
- Sport: Skiing
- Club: Ringebu-Fåvang SK

World Cup career
- Seasons: 7 – (2011, 2013–2018)
- Indiv. starts: 10
- Indiv. podiums: 0
- Team starts: 0
- Overall titles: 0 – (115th in 2015)
- Discipline titles: 0

Emil Nyeng (born 30 April 1991) is a Norwegian cross-country skier and biathlete. He made his FIS Cross-Country World Cup debut in February 2011 in the Drammen sprint race, collecting his first World Cup points in the 2014 edition of the same race with a 21st place. In 2014–15 he broke the top 20 twice, with 19th places in Ruka and Otepää sprints.

== Early life ==
He was born in Tromsø. Growing up in Ringebu, he moved to Lillehammer in 2015. As a child, he won most races, and did not take up training on an elite level. Stated Nyeng; "Warmups for these ski races were snowball fights and wrestling". For his secondary education, he attended vocational school as an electrician.

He competed for Ringebu-Fåvang SK, but eventually trained with the private team Team Veidekke Innlandet.

== World Cup career ==
As a junior racer, Nyeng won the silver medal in sprint at the 2011 Norwegian Junior Championships. He made his World Cup debut in February 2011 in the Drammen sprint race. Albeit finishing lowly, he got the chance again in 2013, and then in 2014 when he finished 21st. He thereby collected his first points in the FIS Cross-Country World Cup.

The 2014–15 World Cup season saw him being selected for his first World Cup race abroad, in Ruka. This became an all-time best with a 19th place, which he then repeated in January 2015 in Otepää. While his goal of competing in the World Cup was reached, he had yet to reach a semi-final in the sprints knockout format. Nyeng later rated his Scandinavian Cup victory in Estonia (Jõulumäe) in February 2015 as one of the proudest moments of his career.

Following a good start in national races in November 2015, he won a berth to the 15 kilometre World Cup race in Lillehammer in December. This was significant as his first non-sprint race in the World Cup. He failed to finish the race, however. The 2015-16 season was eventually cut short due to a form of overtraining. Blood tests showed nothing wrong, but he had to take a break from training. He had to start the 2016-17 season by contesting Norwegian Cup races, and reach the podium there to be considered for World Cup squads.

He once again received a berth at the Drammen sprint races in 2017 and 2018, collecting his final World Cup points with a 22nd place at the latter event. At the close of the 2017-18 season Nyeng won the 95 kilometre race Troll Ski Marathon, crossing the finish line at Sjusjøen only centimetres ahead of the runner-up. He would still focus on shorter races, however. One month later, he announced his decision to retire from cross-country skiing and instead take up the biathlon. His first contest was a show race in Drammen in the summer.

During his first biathlon season, he performed decently in national-level races. However, if he was not able to enter the World Cup races during the forthcoming season, he would retire. To that end, Nyeng tried a new form of training, "heat training", which entailed ergometer cycling in 45 degrees celsius. He competed in the IBU Cup, but with limited success. Nyeng chose to retire in 2020.

== Post-active career ==
During the early stages of the COVID-19 pandemic in Norway, he worked with forest planting. Having won an amateur photography contest in 2016, he pursued a path of press photography.

== World Cup season standings ==
All results are sourced from the International Ski Federation (FIS).

Season	Age	Discipline standings		
Season	Age	Overall	Distance	Sprint
2011	19	NC	—	NC
2013	21	NC	—	NC
2014	22	136	—	83
2015	23	114	—	60
2016	24	NC	NC	—
2017	25	NC	—	NC
2018	26	130	—	72
