= Ringebu Municipality =

Municipality in Innlandet, Norway

Ringebu Municipality Ringebu kommune
- Municipality
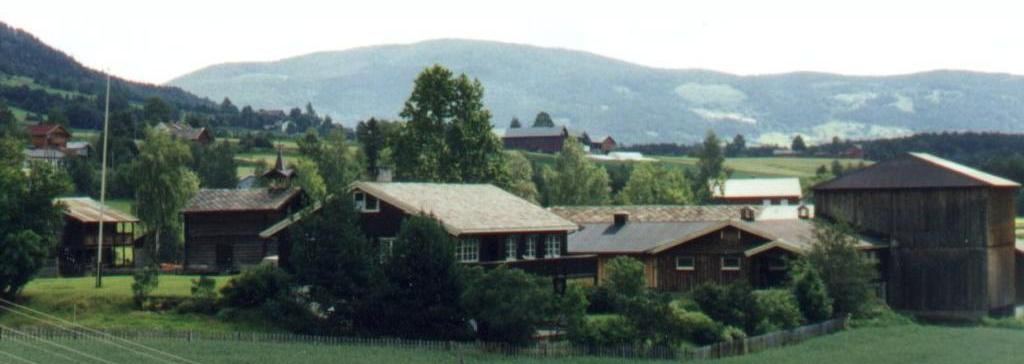

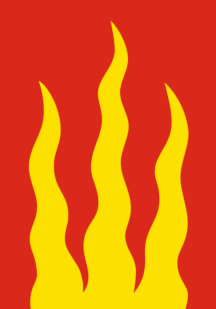
- Flag Coat of arms

- Innlandet within Norway

- Ringebu within Innlandet
- Coordinates: 61°32′8″N 10°18′29″E
- Country: Norway
- County: Innlandet
- District: Gudbrandsdal
- Established: 1 Jan 1838
  - Created as: Formannskapsdistrikt
- Administrative centre: Vålebrua

Government
  - Mayor (2015): Arne Fossmo (Ap)

Area
  - Total: 1,247.57 km^{2} (481.69 sq mi)
  - Land: 1,221.33 km^{2} (471.56 sq mi)
  - Water: 26.24 km^{2} (10.13 sq mi) 2.1%
  - Rank: #85 in Norway
- Highest elevation: 1,424.06 m (4,672.1 ft)

Population (2025)
  - Total: 4,447
  - Rank: #195 in Norway
  - Density: 3.6/km^{2} (9.3/sq mi)
  - Change (10 years): ▼ −1.8%
- Demonym: Ringbygging

Official language
  - Norwegian form: Neutral
- Time zone: UTC+01:00 (CET)
  - Summer (DST): UTC+02:00 (CEST)
- ISO 3166 code: NO-3439
- Website: Official website

Ringebu is a municipality in Innlandet county, Norway. It is located in the traditional district of Gudbrandsdal. The administrative centre of the municipality is the village of Vålebrua (the village is also known as Ringebu). Other villages in the municipality include Fåvang and Brekkom.

The 1,247.57-square-kilometre (481.69 sq mi) municipality is the 85th largest by area out of the 357 municipalities in Norway. Ringebu Municipality is the 195th most populous municipality in Norway with a population of 4,447. The municipality's population density is 3.6 inhabitants per square kilometre (9.3/sq mi) and its population has decreased by 1.8% over the previous 10-year period.

== General information ==
The prestegjeld of Ringebu was established as a municipality on 1 January 1838, under the formannskapsdistrikt law. In 1864, the northern part of Ringebu Municipality, with a population of 386, was separated to form the new Sollia Municipality. In 1890, Sollia was transferred from Oppland county to Hedmark county. On 1 January 1899, an uninhabited area of Ringebu Municipality, then in Oppland county, was transferred to the neighbouring Sollia Municipality in Hedmark county.

Historically, the municipality belonged to the former Oppland county. On 1 January 2020, Ringebu became part of the newly created Innlandet county, formed by the merger of Hedmark and Oppland.

=== Name ===
The municipality, originally the parish, is named after the old Ringebu farm, recorded in Old Norse as Ringabú or Hringabú, since Ringebu Stave Church was built there. The first element was probably derived from ringr, meaning "ring", although the precise sense of the word in this place name is uncertain. The final element is bú, meaning "farm", "estate" or "rural area".

=== Coat of arms ===
The coat of arms was granted on 24 April 1992. The official blazon is "Gules, a three-tongued flame Or" (Norwegian: I rødt en oppvoksende tretunget gull flamme). This means that the arms have a red field, or background, and that the charge is a three-tongued flame. The charge has a tincture of Or, which is usually shown as yellow, or as gold when metal is used.

The three tongues of the flame represent the municipality's three valleys and three parishes: Ringebu, Fåvang and Venabygd. Fire was chosen as a symbol of heat and light, regarded as common needs. The arms were designed by Inge Rotevatn. The municipal flag uses the same design as the coat of arms.

=== Churches ===
The Church of Norway has three parishes, or sokn, within Ringebu Municipality. They form part of the Sør-Gudbrandsdal prosti, or deanery, in the Diocese of Hamar.

Churches in Ringebu Municipality
Parish (sokn)	Church name	Location of the church	Year built
Fåvang	Fåvang Stave Church	Fåvang	1630
Fåvang	Fåvangfjellet Chapel	Gulhaugsætra	1974
Ringebu	Ringebu Stave Church	Vålebrua	c. 1220
Venabygd	Venabygd Church	Venabygd	1780
Venabygd	Venabygd Chapel	Venabu	1979

== History ==
Number of minorities (1st and 2nd generation) in Ringebu by country of origin in 2017
Ancestry	Number
Poland	109
Netherlands	41
Lithuania	38
Latvia	38
Syria	29

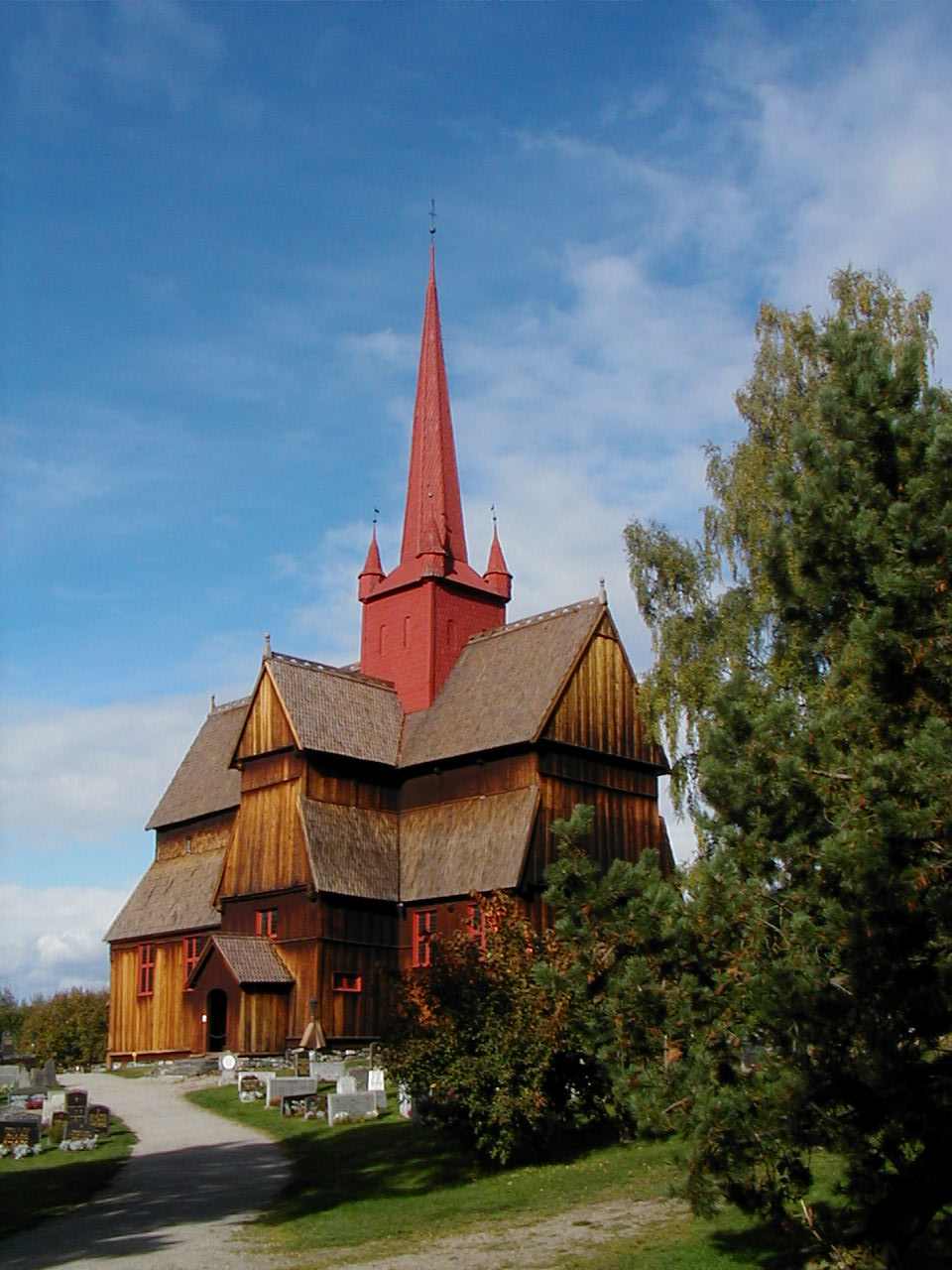
Ringebu Stavkyrkje

The stave church at Ringebu was built around the year 1220 and it is one of fewer than 30 surviving stave churches in Norway and is one of the largest.

About 15 kilometres (9.3 mi) north of the church lies the old Hundorp farm which is the legendary home of Dale-Gudbrand. Dale-Gudbrand is mentioned in the Heimskringla (English: The Chronicle of the Kings of Norway) by Snorri Sturluson. The account of King Olaf's (A.D. 1015–1021) conversion of Dale-Gudbrand to Christianity is popularly recognized.

== Geography ==
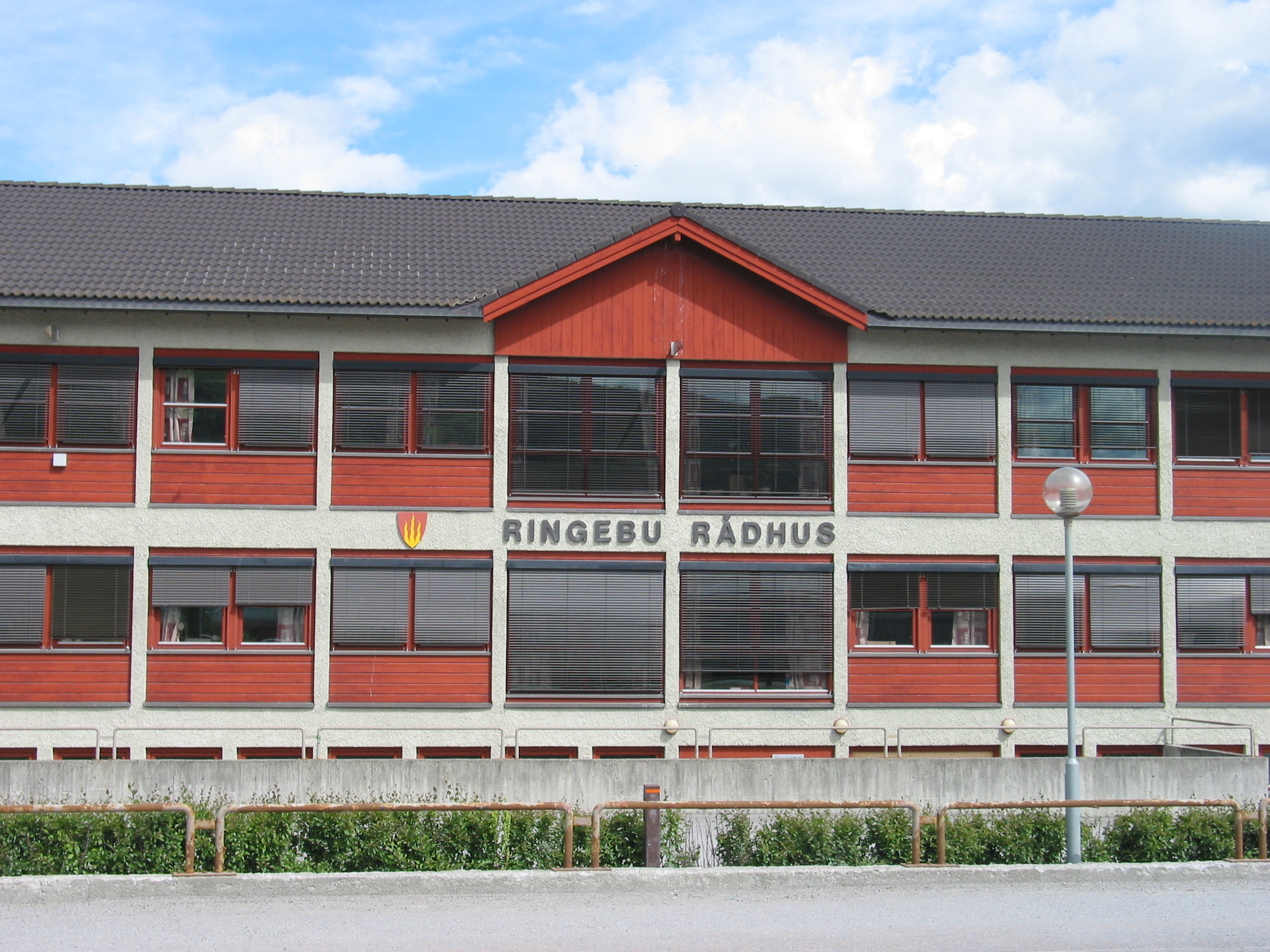
Ringebu municipal hall.

Ringebu Municipality is bordered to the west by Sør-Fron Municipality, to the southwest by Gausdal Municipality, to the southeast by Øyer Municipality, and to the east and north by Stor-Elvdal Municipality. The highest point in the municipality is the 1,424.06-metre (4,672.1 ft) tall mountain Muen, on the border with Stor-Elvdal Municipality.

The administrative center of Ringebu Municipality is the village of Vålebrua which is located at an elevation of 182 metres (597 ft) above sea level in the valley along the river Gudbrandsdalslågen, but 50% of the area within the municipal borders lies at an elevation greater than 900 metres (3,000 ft) above sea level. From Ringebu, two mountain passes provide road access into the Østerdal valley to the northeast; one of these is closed during the winter. Because these mountain areas reliably provide good snow conditions, the area is a popular tourist destination. The Kvitfjell ski area in Ringebu was expanded to serve as a downhill venue for the 1994 Winter Olympics.

== Climate ==
Climate data for Venabu 1991-2020 (930 m)
Month	Jan	Feb	Mar	Apr	May	Jun	Jul	Aug	Sep	Oct	Nov	Dec	Year
Mean daily maximum °C (°F)	−4.9 (23.2)	−4.4 (24.1)	−1.2 (29.8)	3.6 (38.5)	9.2 (48.6)	13.9 (57.0)	16.8 (62.2)	14.8 (58.6)	10 (50)	3.3 (37.9)	−1.8 (28.8)	−4.4 (24.1)	4.6 (40.2)
Daily mean °C (°F)	−7.7 (18.1)	−8.1 (17.4)	−5.7 (21.7)	−1.3 (29.7)	3.9 (39.0)	8.7 (47.7)	11.5 (52.7)	10 (50)	5.7 (42.3)	0 (32)	−4.4 (24.1)	−7.4 (18.7)	0.4 (32.8)
Mean daily minimum °C (°F)	−11.2 (11.8)	−11.4 (11.5)	−9.2 (15.4)	−4.6 (23.7)	0.1 (32.2)	4.5 (40.1)	7.5 (45.5)	6.4 (43.5)	2.8 (37.0)	−2.4 (27.7)	−7.2 (19.0)	−10.6 (12.9)	−2.9 (26.7)
Average precipitation mm (inches)	53.3 (2.10)	33.6 (1.32)	35.4 (1.39)	31.9 (1.26)	61 (2.4)	78.3 (3.08)	100.8 (3.97)	103.2 (4.06)	64.1 (2.52)	62.6 (2.46)	57.7 (2.27)	48.9 (1.93)	730.8 (28.76)
Average precipitation days (≥ 1.0 mm)	12	8	9	8	10	12	13	14	10	10	12	11	129
Source: NOAA - WMO averages 91-2020 Norway

== Government ==
Ringebu Municipality is responsible for primary education (through 10th grade), outpatient health services, senior citizen services, welfare and other social services, zoning, economic development, and municipal roads and utilities. The municipality is governed by a municipal council of directly elected representatives. The mayor is indirectly elected by a vote of the municipal council. The municipality is under the jurisdiction of the Gudbrandsdal District Court and the Eidsivating Court of Appeal.

=== Municipal council ===
The municipal council (Kommunestyre) of Ringebu Municipality is made up of 21 representatives that are elected to four year terms. The tables below show the current and historical composition of the council by political party.

Ringebu kommunestyre 2023–2027
Party name (in Norwegian)	Number of representatives
Labour Party (Arbeiderpartiet)	12
Green Party (Miljøpartiet De Grønne)	1
Conservative Party (Høyre)	1
Centre Party (Senterpartiet)	6
Cross-party list (Tverrpolitisk liste)	3
Total number of members:	21

Ringebu kommunestyre 2019–2023
Party name (in Norwegian)	Number of representatives
Labour Party (Arbeiderpartiet)	11
Green Party (Miljøpartiet De Grønne)	1
Centre Party (Senterpartiet)	6
Joint list of the Conservative Party (Høyre) and the Liberal Party (Venstre)	1
Cross-party list (Tverrpolitisk liste)	2
Total number of members:	21

Ringebu kommunestyre 2015–2019
Party name (in Norwegian)	Number of representatives
Labour Party (Arbeiderpartiet)	11
Conservative Party (Høyre)	1
Centre Party (Senterpartiet)	6
Liberal Party (Venstre)	2
Cross-party list (Tverrpolitisk liste)	1
Total number of members:	21

Ringebu kommunestyre 2011–2015
Party name (in Norwegian)	Number of representatives
Labour Party (Arbeiderpartiet)	5
Progress Party (Fremskrittspartiet)	1
Conservative Party (Høyre)	1
Centre Party (Senterpartiet)	5
Liberal Party (Venstre)	3
Cross-party list (Tverrpolitisk liste)	6
Total number of members:	21

Ringebu kommunestyre 2007–2011
Party name (in Norwegian)	Number of representatives
Labour Party (Arbeiderpartiet)	9
Progress Party (Fremskrittspartiet)	2
Conservative Party (Høyre)	1
Centre Party (Senterpartiet)	7
Liberal Party (Venstre)	2
Total number of members:	21

Ringebu kommunestyre 2003–2007
Party name (in Norwegian)	Number of representatives
Labour Party (Arbeiderpartiet)	8
Progress Party (Fremskrittspartiet)	2
Conservative Party (Høyre)	1
Centre Party (Senterpartiet)	8
Socialist Left Party (Sosialistisk Venstreparti)	1
Liberal Party (Venstre)	1
Total number of members:	21

Ringebu kommunestyre 1999–2003
Party name (in Norwegian)	Number of representatives
Labour Party (Arbeiderpartiet)	13
Conservative Party (Høyre)	2
Centre Party (Senterpartiet)	11
Liberal Party (Venstre)	3
Total number of members:	29

Ringebu kommunestyre 1995–1999
Party name (in Norwegian)	Number of representatives
Labour Party (Arbeiderpartiet)	14
Conservative Party (Høyre)	2
Centre Party (Senterpartiet)	11
Local list (Bygdalista)	2
Total number of members:	29

Ringebu kommunestyre 1991–1995
Party name (in Norwegian)	Number of representatives
Labour Party (Arbeiderpartiet)	16
Conservative Party (Høyre)	2
Christian Democratic Party (Kristelig Folkeparti)	1
Centre Party (Senterpartiet)	8
Local list (Bygdalista)	2
Total number of members:	29

Ringebu kommunestyre 1987–1991
Party name (in Norwegian)	Number of representatives
Labour Party (Arbeiderpartiet)	16
Conservative Party (Høyre)	3
Christian Democratic Party (Kristelig Folkeparti)	1
Centre Party (Senterpartiet)	5
Local list (Bygdeliste)	4
Total number of members:	29

Ringebu kommunestyre 1983–1987
Party name (in Norwegian)	Number of representatives
Labour Party (Arbeiderpartiet)	18
Conservative Party (Høyre)	4
Christian Democratic Party (Kristelig Folkeparti)	1
Centre Party (Senterpartiet)	5
Liberal Party (Venstre)	1
Total number of members:	29

Ringebu kommunestyre 1979–1983
Party name (in Norwegian)	Number of representatives
Labour Party (Arbeiderpartiet)	17
Conservative Party (Høyre)	4
Christian Democratic Party (Kristelig Folkeparti)	1
Centre Party (Senterpartiet)	6
Liberal Party (Venstre)	1
Total number of members:	29

Ringebu kommunestyre 1975–1979
Party name (in Norwegian)	Number of representatives
Labour Party (Arbeiderpartiet)	15
Conservative Party (Høyre)	2
Christian Democratic Party (Kristelig Folkeparti)	2
Centre Party (Senterpartiet)	7
Socialist Left Party (Sosialistisk Venstreparti)	1
Joint list of small farmholders and the Liberal Party (Småbrukerne og Venstre)	2
Total number of members:	29

Ringebu kommunestyre 1971–1975
Party name (in Norwegian)	Number of representatives
Labour Party (Arbeiderpartiet)	15
Conservative Party (Høyre)	2
Christian Democratic Party (Kristelig Folkeparti)	1
Centre Party (Senterpartiet)	7
Joint List(s) of Non-Socialist Parties (Borgerlige Felleslister)	3
Socialist common list (Venstresosialistiske felleslister)	1
Total number of members:	29

Ringebu kommunestyre 1967–1971
Party name (in Norwegian)	Number of representatives
Labour Party (Arbeiderpartiet)	15
Conservative Party (Høyre)	2
Christian Democratic Party (Kristelig Folkeparti)	1
Centre Party (Senterpartiet)	7
Socialist People's Party (Sosialistisk Folkeparti)	1
List of workers, fishermen, and small farmholders (Arbeidere, fiskere, småbrukere liste)	3
Total number of members:	29

Ringebu kommunestyre 1963–1967
Party name (in Norwegian)	Number of representatives
Labour Party (Arbeiderpartiet)	14
Conservative Party (Høyre)	2
Christian Democratic Party (Kristelig Folkeparti)	1
Centre Party (Senterpartiet)	7
List of workers, fishermen, and small farmholders (Arbeidere, fiskere, småbrukere liste)	5
Total number of members:	29

Ringebu herredsstyre 1959–1963
Party name (in Norwegian)	Number of representatives
Labour Party (Arbeiderpartiet)	14
Conservative Party (Høyre)	2
Christian Democratic Party (Kristelig Folkeparti)	1
Centre Party (Senterpartiet)	7
List of workers, fishermen, and small farmholders (Arbeidere, fiskere, småbrukere liste)	5
Total number of members:	29

Ringebu herredsstyre 1955–1959
Party name (in Norwegian)	Number of representatives
Labour Party (Arbeiderpartiet)	16
Conservative Party (Høyre)	1
Communist Party (Kommunistiske Parti)	1
Christian Democratic Party (Kristelig Folkeparti)	1
Farmers' Party (Bondepartiet)	8
Liberal Party (Venstre)	2
Total number of members:	29

Ringebu herredsstyre 1951–1955
Party name (in Norwegian)	Number of representatives
Labour Party (Arbeiderpartiet)	15
Communist Party (Kommunistiske Parti)	1
Christian Democratic Party (Kristelig Folkeparti)	1
Farmers' Party (Bondepartiet)	9
Liberal Party (Venstre)	2
Total number of members:	28

Ringebu herredsstyre 1947–1951
Party name (in Norwegian)	Number of representatives
Labour Party (Arbeiderpartiet)	14
Communist Party (Kommunistiske Parti)	1
Farmers' Party (Bondepartiet)	10
Joint list of the Liberal Party (Venstre) and the Radical People's Party (Radikale Folkepartiet)	3
Total number of members:	28

Ringebu herredsstyre 1945–1947
Party name (in Norwegian)	Number of representatives
Labour Party (Arbeiderpartiet)	16
Communist Party (Kommunistiske Parti)	1
Farmers' Party (Bondepartiet)	9
Joint list of the Liberal Party (Venstre) and the Radical People's Party (Radikale Folkepartiet)	1
List of workers, fishermen, and small farmholders (Arbeidere, fiskere, småbrukere liste)	1
Total number of members:	28

Ringebu herredsstyre 1937–1940*
Party name (in Norwegian)	Number of representatives
Labour Party (Arbeiderpartiet)	14
Farmers' Party (Bondepartiet)	11
Joint list of the Liberal Party (Venstre) and the Radical People's Party (Radikale Folkepartiet)	3
Total number of members:	28
Note: Due to the German occupation of Norway during World War II, no elections were held for new municipal councils until after the war ended in 1945.

=== Mayors ===
The mayor (Norwegian: ordfører) of Ringebu Municipality is the political leader of the municipality and the chairperson of the municipal council. Here is a list of people who have held this position:

- 1838–1853: Vilhelm Fegth
- 1854–1871: Nils Iversen Elstad
- 1872–1873: Nils Johannessen Jevne
- 1874–1877: John Kristiansen Mæhlum
- 1878–1881: Ole Christian Elstad
- 1882–1883: Nils Iversen Elstad
- 1884–1893: Ole Christian Elstad (H)
- 1894–1897: Simen Kolstad (V)
- 1898–1899: Ole Christian Elstad (H)
- 1899–1910: Simen Kolstad (AD)
- 1911–1913: Jon Nordrum (H)
- 1914–1925: Simen Kolstad (AD)
- 1926–1928: Einar Vestad (Sp)
- 1929–1934: Johan Hustveit (AD)
- 1935–1937: Einar Vestad (Sp)
- 1938–1941: Johan Hustveit (AD)
- 1942–1945: Sigurd Mytting (NS)
- 1945–1959: Asbjørn Haug (Ap)
- 1960–1967: Ole Ringen (V)
- 1968–1985: Birger Sæther (Ap)
- 1985–1995: Erik S. Winther (Ap)
- 1996–2007: Anders A. Fretheim (Sp)
- 2007–2011: Arnhild Baukhol (Ap)
- 2011–2015: Erik Odlo (Sp)
- 2015–present: Arne Fossmo (Ap)

== Sister cities ==
Ringebu has sister city agreements with the following places:

- - Filipstad, Värmland County, Sweden

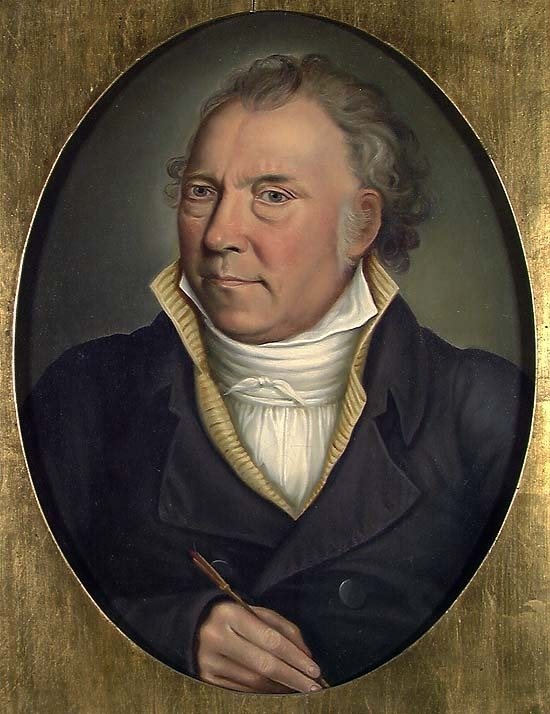
Frederik Petersen, 1815

== Notable people ==
- Frederik Petersen (1759 in Ringebu – 1825), a painter of portraits
- Jehans Nordbu (1768 in Ringebu — ca.1860), a Norwegian-American immigrant to the US and an early settler in Texas
- Hans Engen (1912 in Ringebu – 1966), a journalist, diplomat and politician, Norwegian ambassador to the United States from 1963 to 1966
- Emil Nyeng (born 1991), a cross-country skier
