= Fåvangfjellet Chapel =

Church in Innlandet, Norway

- Fåvangfjellet sportskapell
- Gullhaugen seter kapell
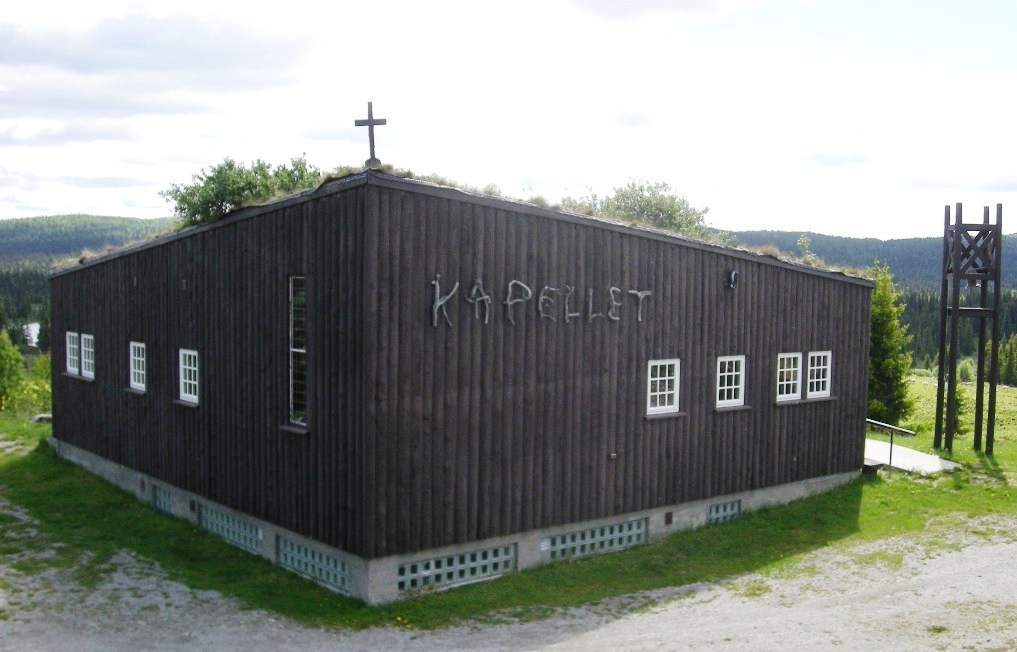
- View of the church
- Fåvangfjellet Chapel
- 61°25′15″N 10°23′34″E
- Location: Ringebu Municipality, Innlandet
- Country: Norway
- Denomination: Church of Norway
- Churchmanship: Evangelical Lutheran

History
- Status: Parish church
- Founded: 1974
- Consecrated: 20 July 1974

Architecture
- Functional status: Active
- Architect(s): Johan Amrud and Håkon Nybakken
- Architectural type: Fan-shaped
- Completed: 1974 (52 years ago)

Specifications
- Materials: Wood

Administration
- Diocese: Hamar bispedømme
- Deanery: Sør-Gudbrandsdal prosti
- Parish: Fåvang

Fåvangfjellet Church (Norwegian: Fåvangfjellet sportskapell) is a parish church of the Church of Norway in Ringebu Municipality in Innlandet county, Norway. It is located in the village of Gulhaugsætra. It is an annex chapel for the Venabygd parish which is part of the Sør-Gudbrandsdal prosti (deanery) in the Diocese of Hamar. The brown, wooden church was built in a fan-shaped design in 1974 using plans drawn up by the architects Johan Amrud and Håkon Nybakken. The chapel was consecrated on 20 July 1974.

== See also ==
- List of churches in Hamar
