= Fåvang =

Village in Ringebu Municipality, Norway

- Village
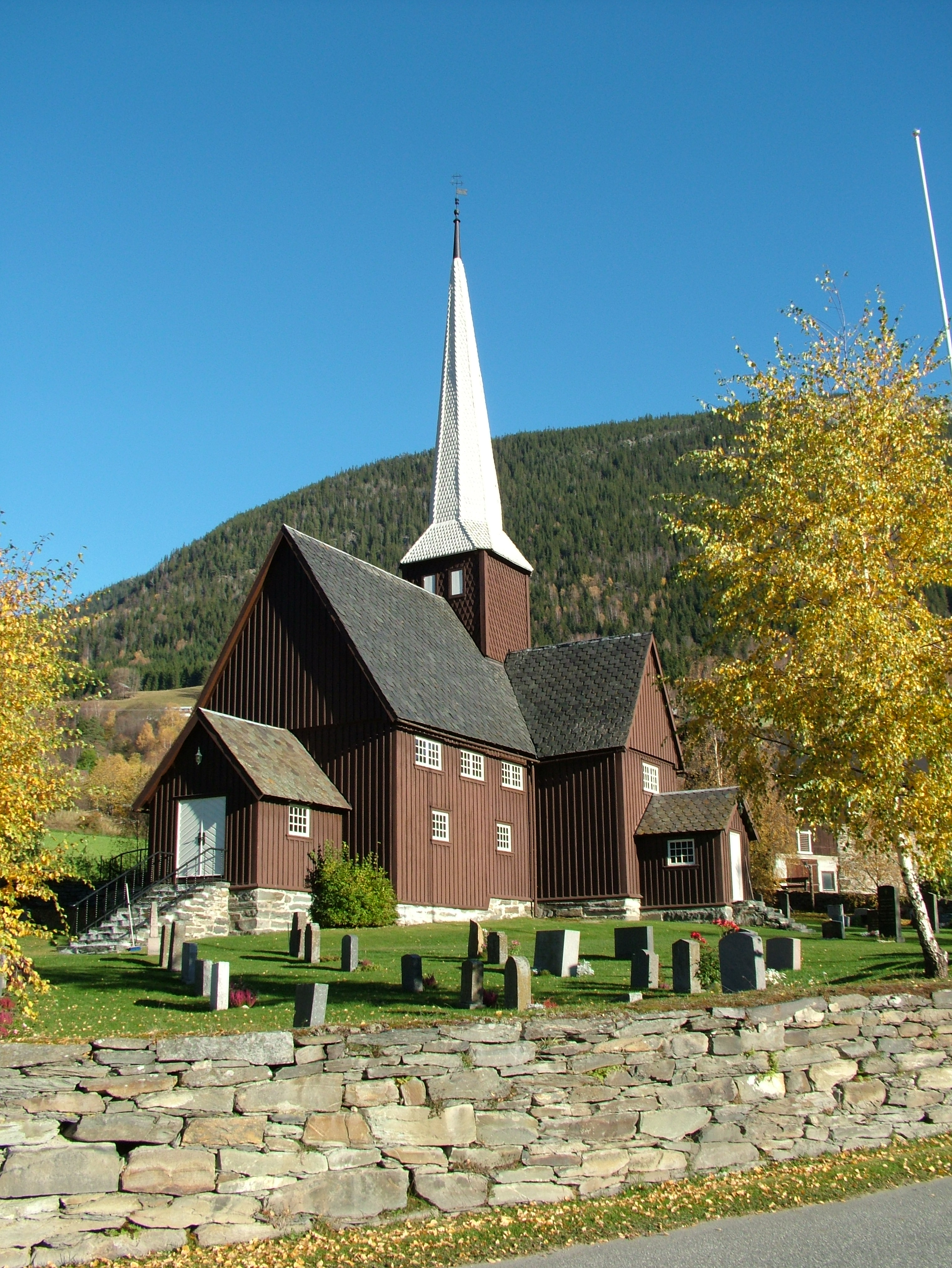
- View of the village church
- Interactive map of Fåvang
- Location within Innlandet Location within Norway
- Coordinates: 61.45536°N 10.19465°E
- Country: Norway
- Region: Eastern Norway
- County: Innlandet
- District: Gudbrandsdalen
- Municipality: Ringebu Municipality

Area
  - Total: 0.93 km^{2} (0.36 sq mi)
- Elevation: 191 m (627 ft)

Population (2024)
  - Total: 712
  - Density: 766/km^{2} (1,980/sq mi)
- Time zone: UTC+01:00 (CET)
  - Summer (DST): UTC+02:00 (CEST)
- Post Code: 2634 Fåvang

Fåvang is a village in Ringebu Municipality in Innlandet county, Norway. The village is located in the Gudbrandsdal valley, along the Gudbrandsdalslågen river, about 50 kilometres (31 mi) north of the town of Lillehammer. The European route E6 highway runs through the village, right along the river. The 0.93-square-kilometre (230-acre) village has a population (2024) of 712 and a population density of 766 inhabitants per square kilometre (1,980/sq mi).

== History ==
Fåvang Stave Church (Fåvang stavkirke) was built after the Reformation, for the most part of using materials from earlier stave churches in the valley which had been demolished. The church was probably built between 1627 and 1630. The oldest parts can be dated back to around 1150–1250.

Particularly heavy fighting took place in Fåvang, as well as neighboring Tretten, Vinstra, Kvam, Sjoa and Otta during the Norwegian Campaign which led up to the occupation of Norway by Nazi Germany. The Norwegian movie Jonny Vang was principally filmed in the town of Fåvang during 2003.

Fåvang is located about 3 kilometres (1.9 mi) away from Kvitfjell, the downhill skiing arena used in the Lillehammer Winter Olympics held in 1994.

== Name ==
The village (and church parish) is named after the old Fåvang farm (Old Norse: Fǫðvangr) since the first Fåvang Church was built there. The first element is the river name Få (see also Fådalen and the old name of Lysakerelva) and the last element is vangr which means 'meadow'.

== Notable people ==
- Finn Kalvik, an artist
