= Ringebu (village) =

Village in Ringebu, Norway

Ringebu Vålebrua / Vålebru
- Village
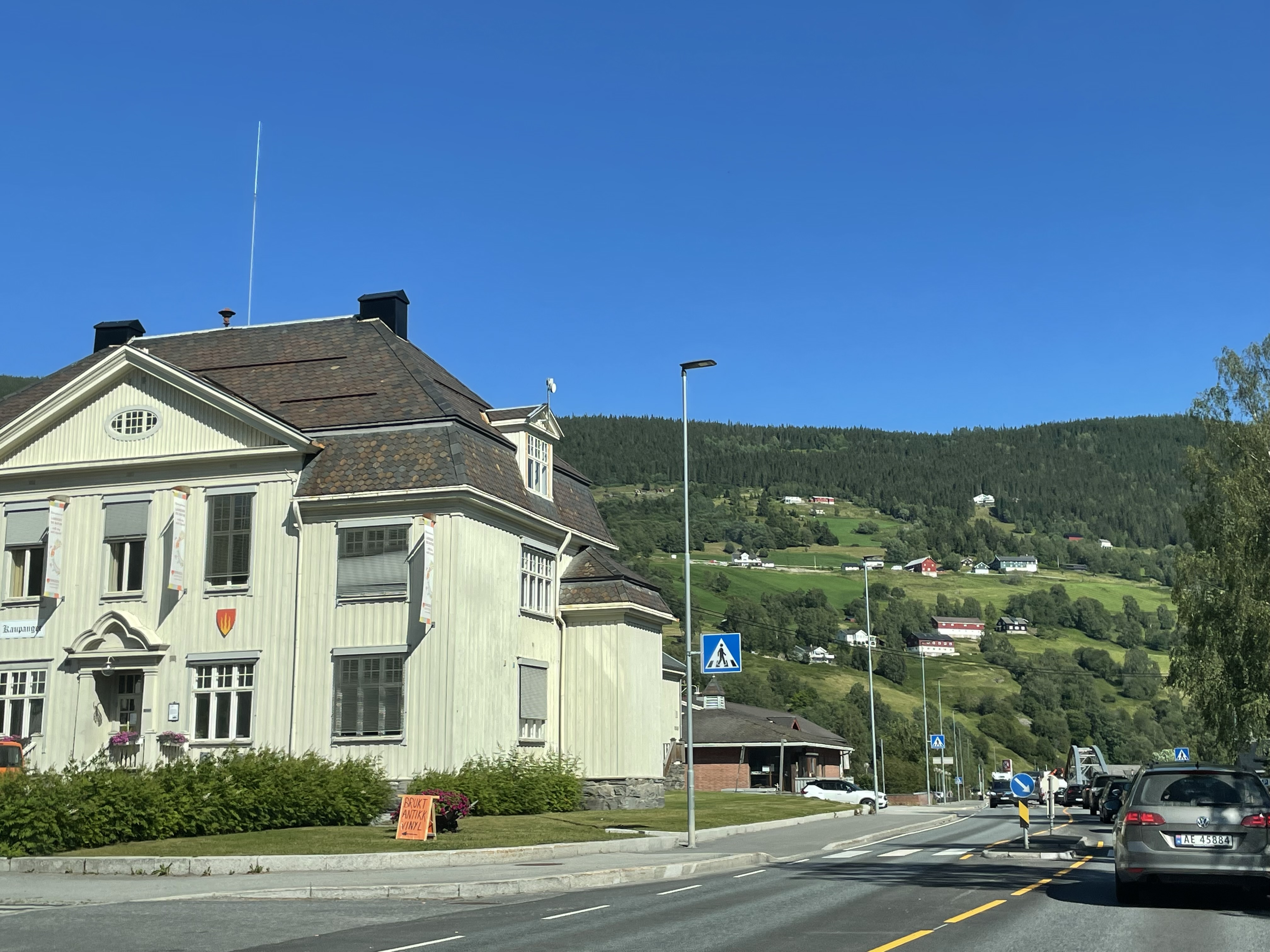
- View of the village
- Interactive map of Ringebu
- Location within Innlandet Location within Norway
- Coordinates: 61.52965°N 10.13889°E
- Country: Norway
- Region: Eastern Norway
- County: Innlandet
- District: Gudbrandsdalen
- Municipality: Ringebu Municipality

Area
  - Total: 1.86 km^{2} (0.72 sq mi)
- Elevation: 199 m (653 ft)

Population (2024)
  - Total: 1,408
  - Density: 757/km^{2} (1,960/sq mi)
- Time zone: UTC+01:00 (CET)
  - Summer (DST): UTC+02:00 (CEST)
- Post Code: 2630 Ringebu

Ringebu or Vålebrua is the administrative centre of Ringebu Municipality in Innlandet county, Norway. The village is located in the Gudbrandsdal valley, along the Gudbrandsdalslågen river. The European route E6 highway and the Dovrebanen railway line both pass through the village. The 1.86-square-kilometre (460-acre) village has a population (2024) of 1,408 and a population density of 757 inhabitants per square kilometre (1,960/sq mi).

The Ringebu Stave Church is located about 3 kilometres (1.9 mi) to the southeast of the village.

== Name ==
The village is named Ringebu which is the same as the name of the municipality in which it is located. The name Vålebrua is another name for the village which is most often used when one wants to avoid ambiguity between the village of Ringebu and Ringebu Municipality. The name Vålebrua comes from the local river Våla, which flows through the village, and the bridge (brua) that was laid over the river here.
