= Ringebu Stave Church =

Church in Innlandet, Norway

- Ringebu stavkyrkje
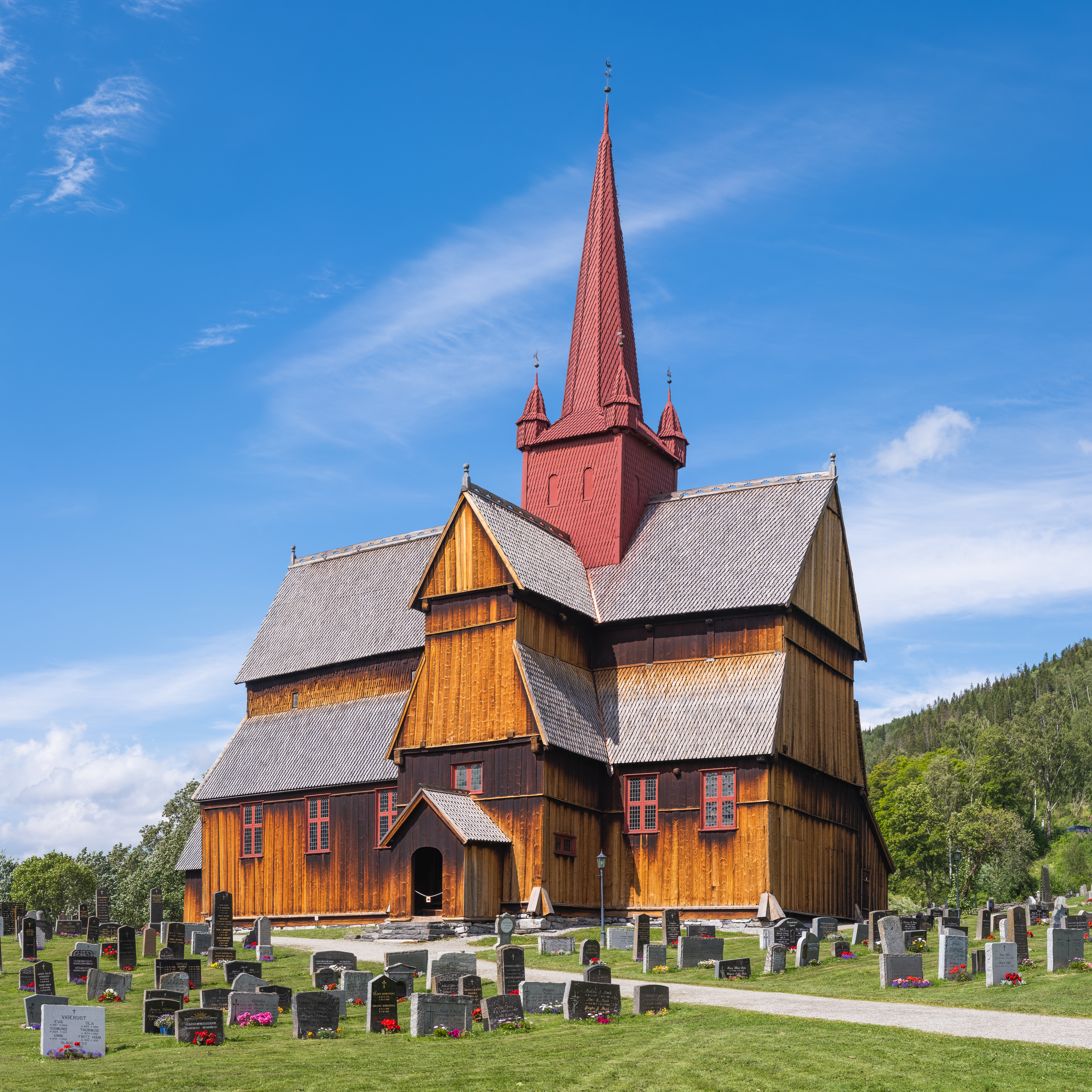
- View of the church
- Ringebu Stave Church
- 61°30′34″N 10°10′23″E
- Location: Ringebu Municipality, Innlandet
- Country: Norway
- Denomination: Church of Norway
- Previous denomination: Catholic Church
- Churchmanship: Evangelical Lutheran

History
- Status: Parish church
- Founded: c. 1220
- Consecrated: c. 1220

Architecture
- Functional status: Active
- Architectural type: Stave church
- Style: Romanesque
- Completed: c. 1220 (806 years ago)

Specifications
- Materials: Wood

Administration
- Diocese: Hamar bispedømme
- Deanery: Sør-Gudbrandsdal prosti
- Parish: Ringebu
- Norwegian Cultural Heritage Site
- Type: Church
- Status: Automatically protected
- ID: 85295

Ringebu Stave Church (Norwegian: Ringebu stavkyrkje) is a parish church of the Church of Norway in Ringebu Municipality in Innlandet county, Norway. It is located in the village of Ringebu in the Gudbrandsdalen valley. It is the church for the Ringebu parish which is part of the Sør-Gudbrandsdal prosti (deanery) in the Diocese of Hamar. The brown, wooden church was built in a stave church design around the year 1220 using plans drawn up by an unknown architect. The church seats about 300 people.

== History ==
The earliest existing historical records of the church date back to the year 1270, but the church was not new that year. The first church in Ringebu was a wooden post church that was built in the 11th century. This church was in use for about 200 years before it was torn down in the early 13th century. A new wooden stave church was then built on the same site. Dendrochronological dating of the logs used to build this church show that the logs were cut in the 1190s, so the church must have been constructed in the early 1200s. This church had a long church design.

Around the year 1630, the master-builder Werner Olsen (ca. 1600–1682) began a large expansion and renovation project on the church. The nave was enlarged by adding a transept wing to the north and south, creating a cruciform floor plan. A new central tower was constructed on the roof over the central part of the nave. This significant renovation changed the character of the church and it left several free standing posts in the interior of the nave that remained from the original stave church, but most of the rest of the building looked quite new at the time. The church was painted in 1717, but only the lower half of the walls were done, since the ceiling at that time was lower.

In 1814, this church served as an election church (Norwegian: valgkirke). Together with more than 300 other parish churches across Norway, it was a polling station for elections to the 1814 Norwegian Constituent Assembly which wrote the Constitution of Norway. This was Norway's first national elections. Each church parish was a constituency that elected people called "electors" who later met together in each county to elect the representatives for the assembly that was to meet at Eidsvoll Manor later that year.

Later restoration in 1921 brought it back a bit closer to its original shape. At one point the church was painted white within, but during the restoration work by Ragnvald Einbu in 1921 the church interior was restored to its original colouring.

There have been some archaeological surveys of the ground under the church. The last one took place in 1980–1981. These surveys resulted in the finding of about 900 old coins, mostly from medieval times, especially from the period 1217–1263. Post holes from an older church were also found, supporting the tradition that a church had stood on the site before the present building. The post church is assumed to be a forerunner of the stave church. The earth-bound posts of these churches were planted directly into the ground, and therefore they were exposed to humidity which caused them to rot over the years.

== Media gallery ==
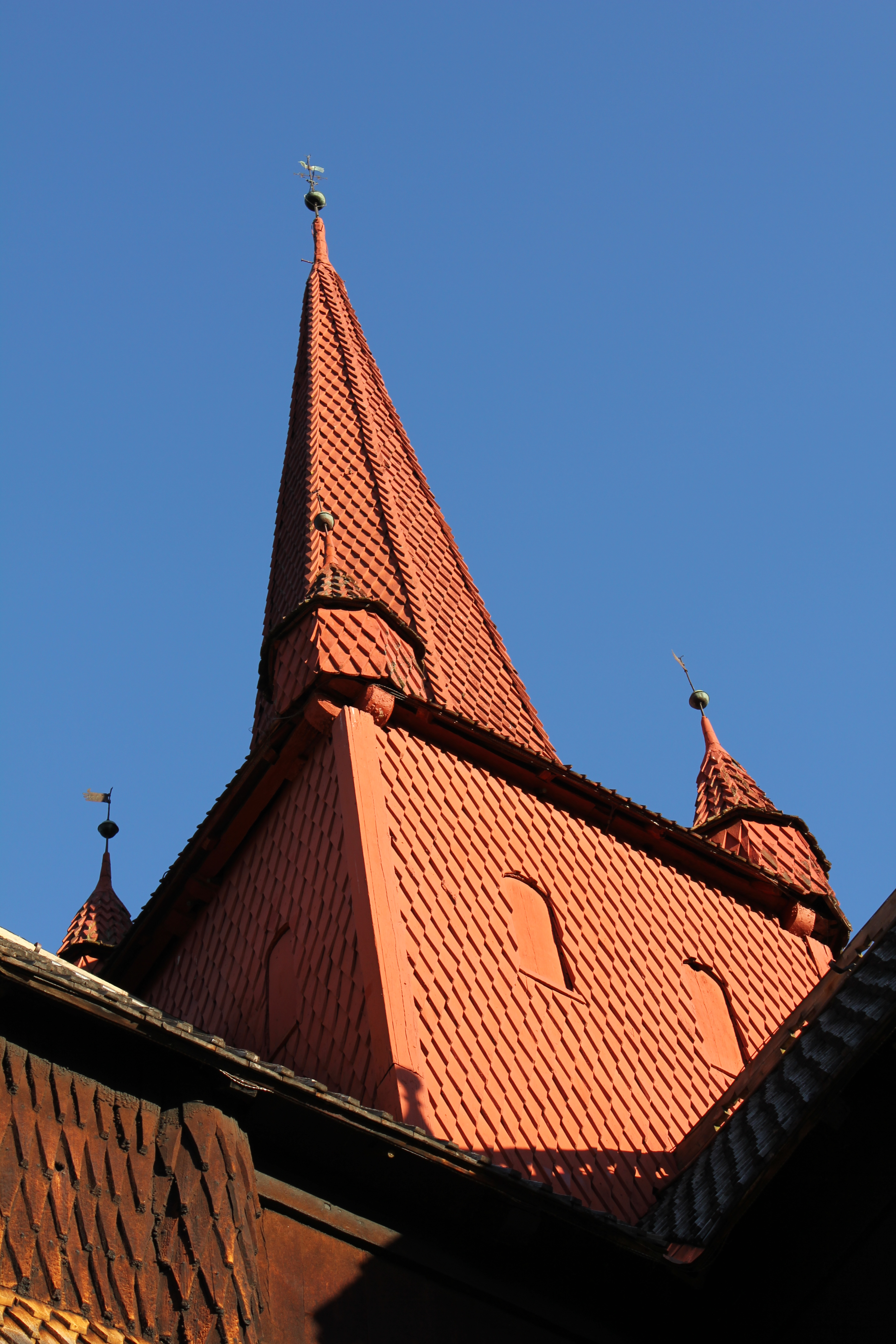
Ringebu Stave Church spire

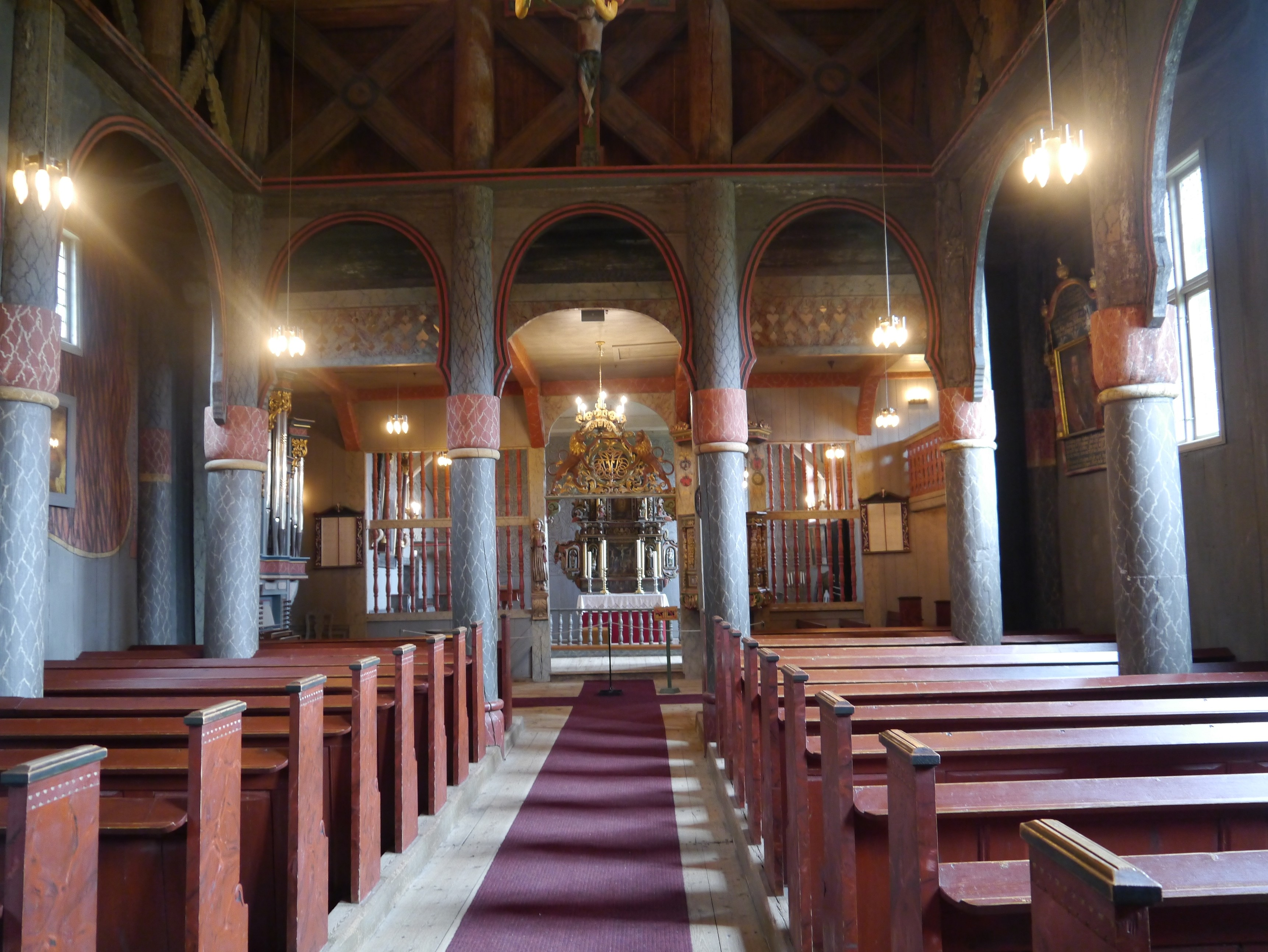

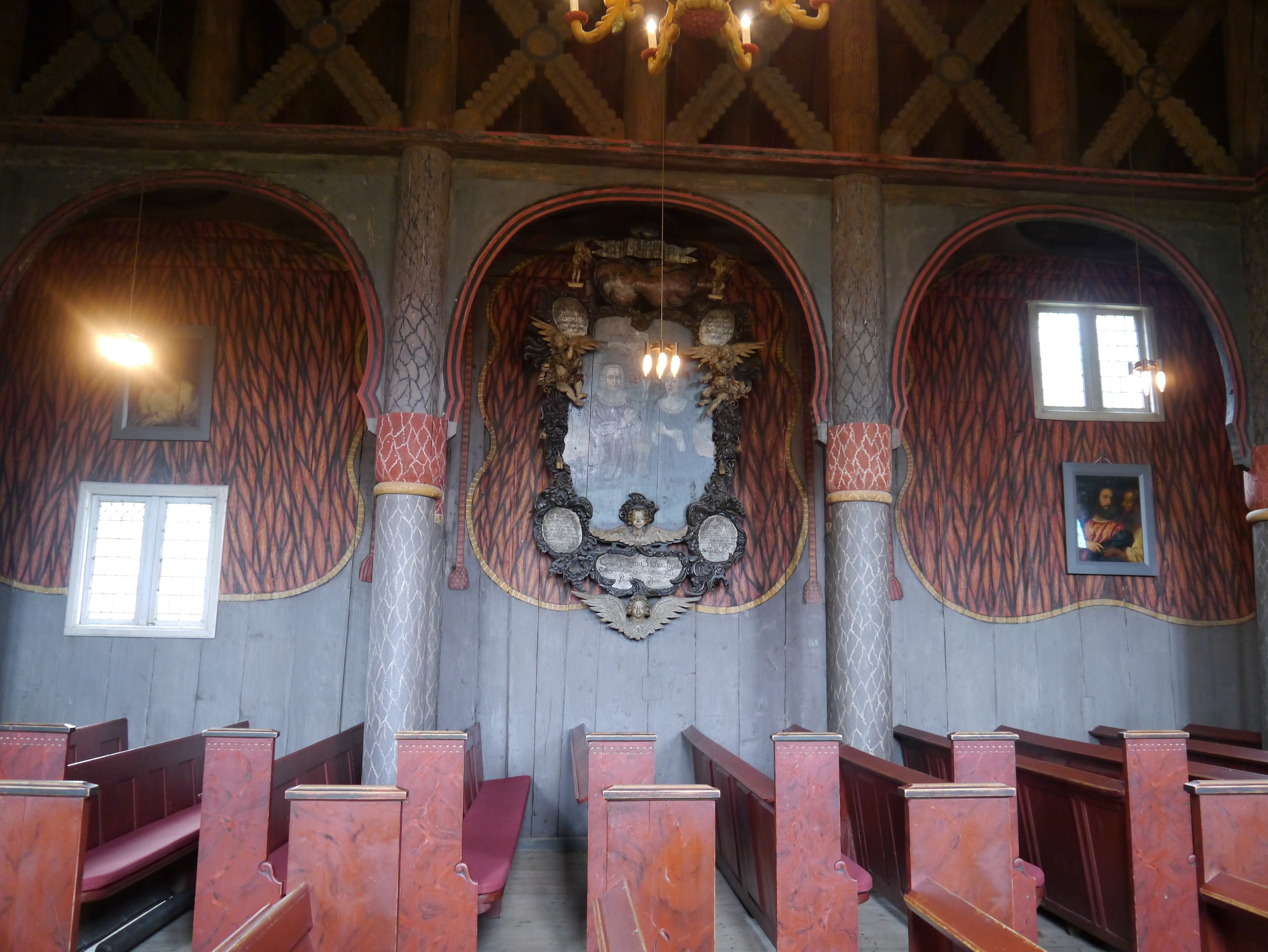

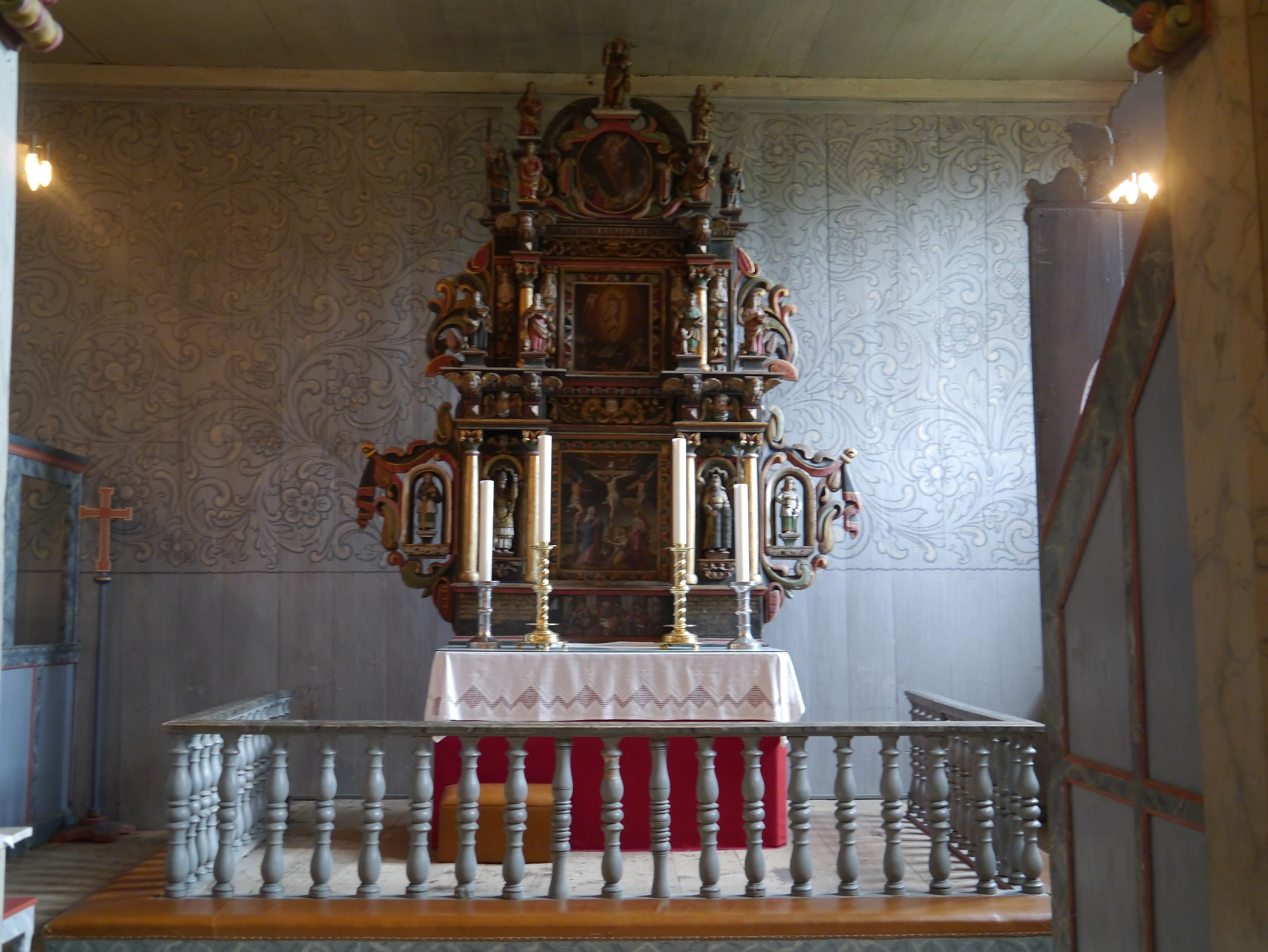
Altar

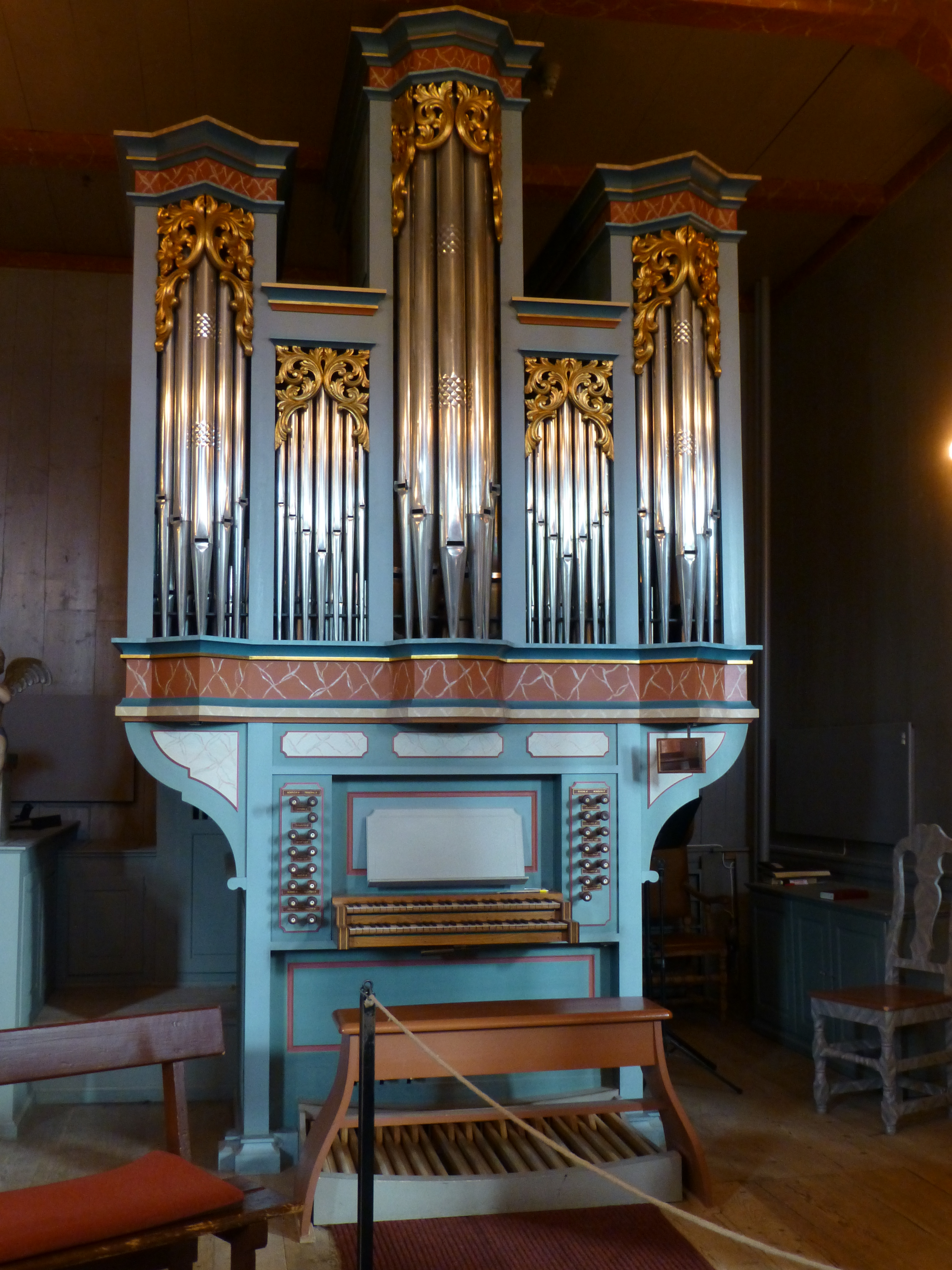
Organ

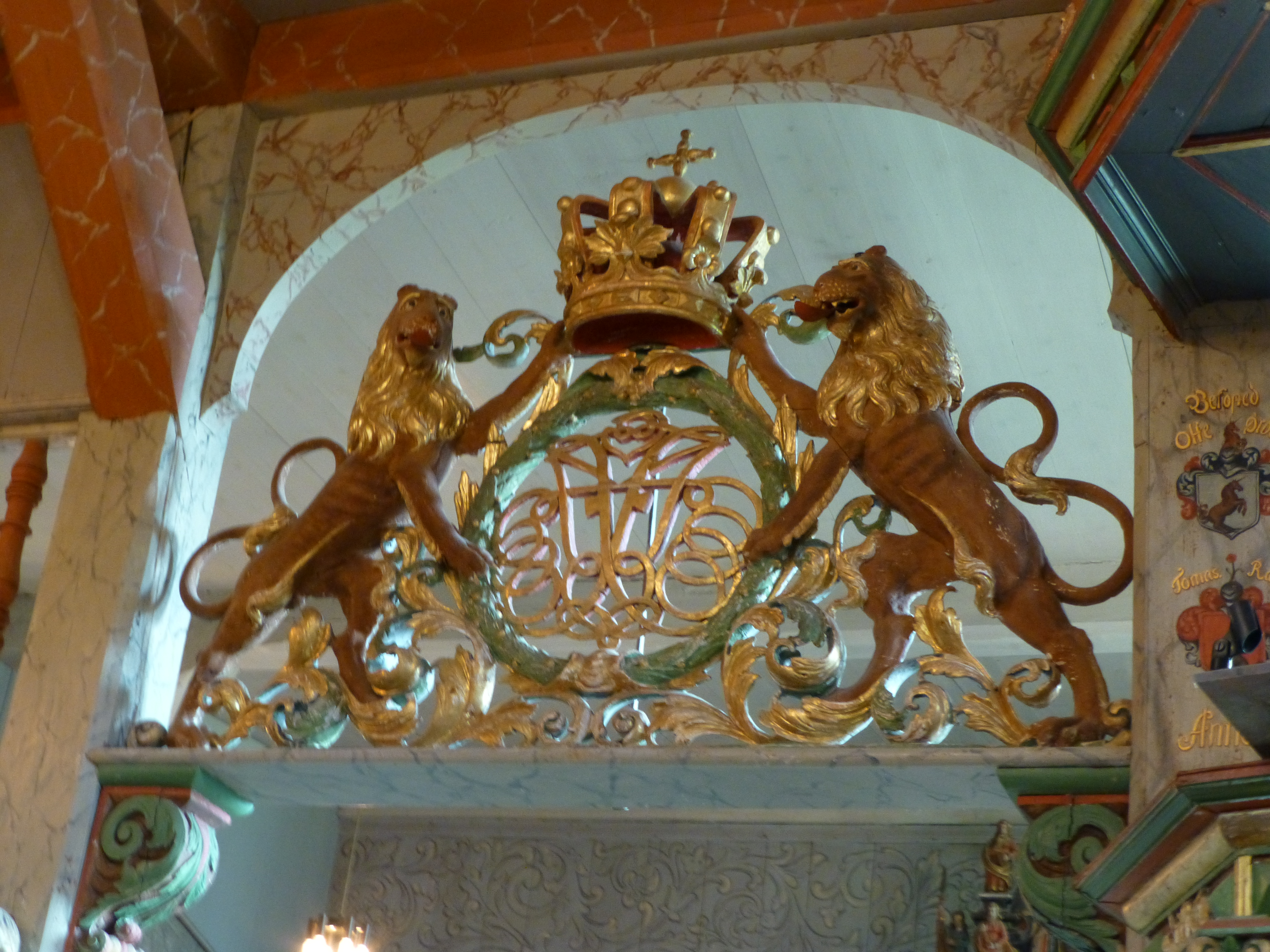
Coat-of–Arms

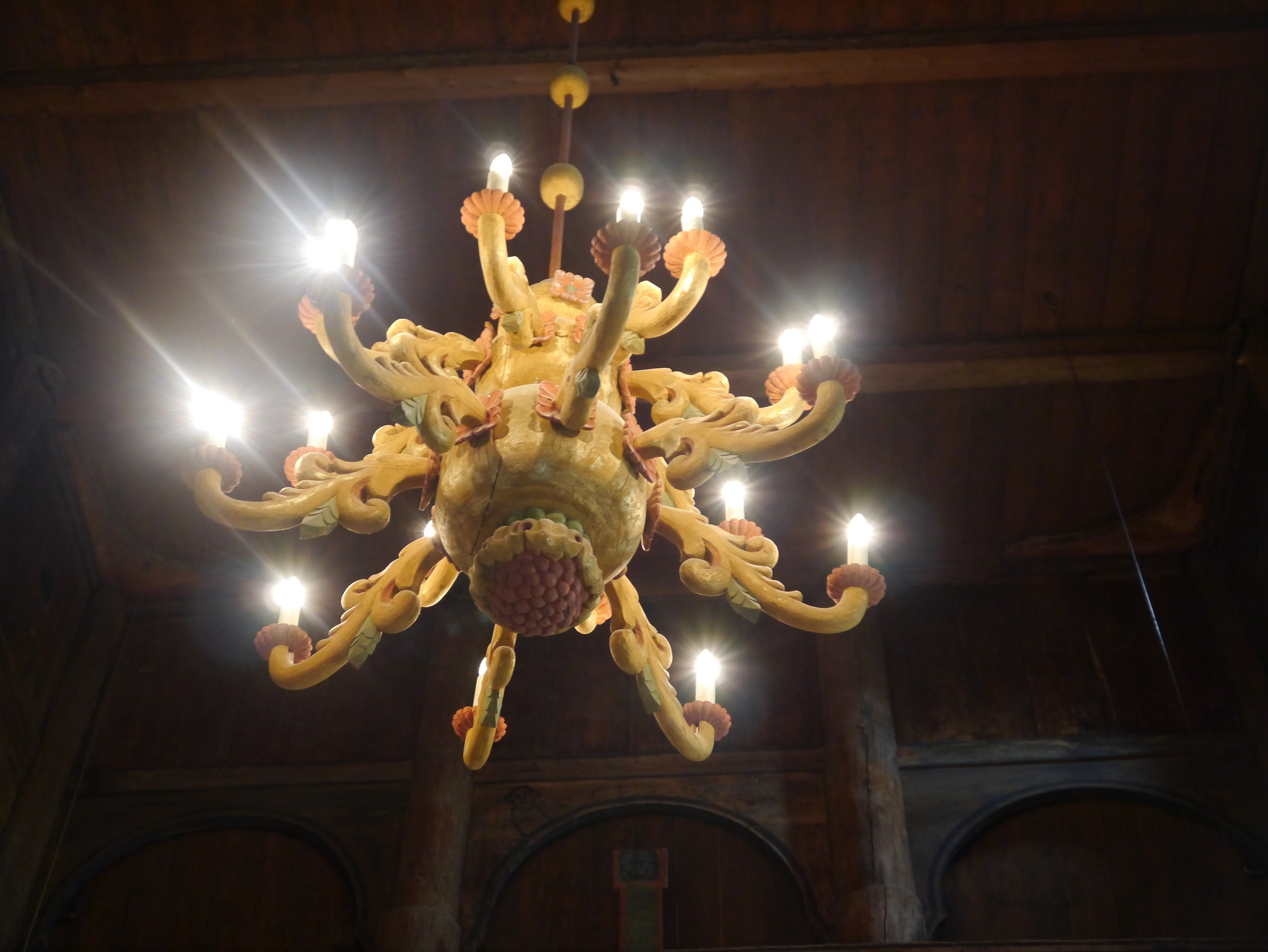
Chandelier

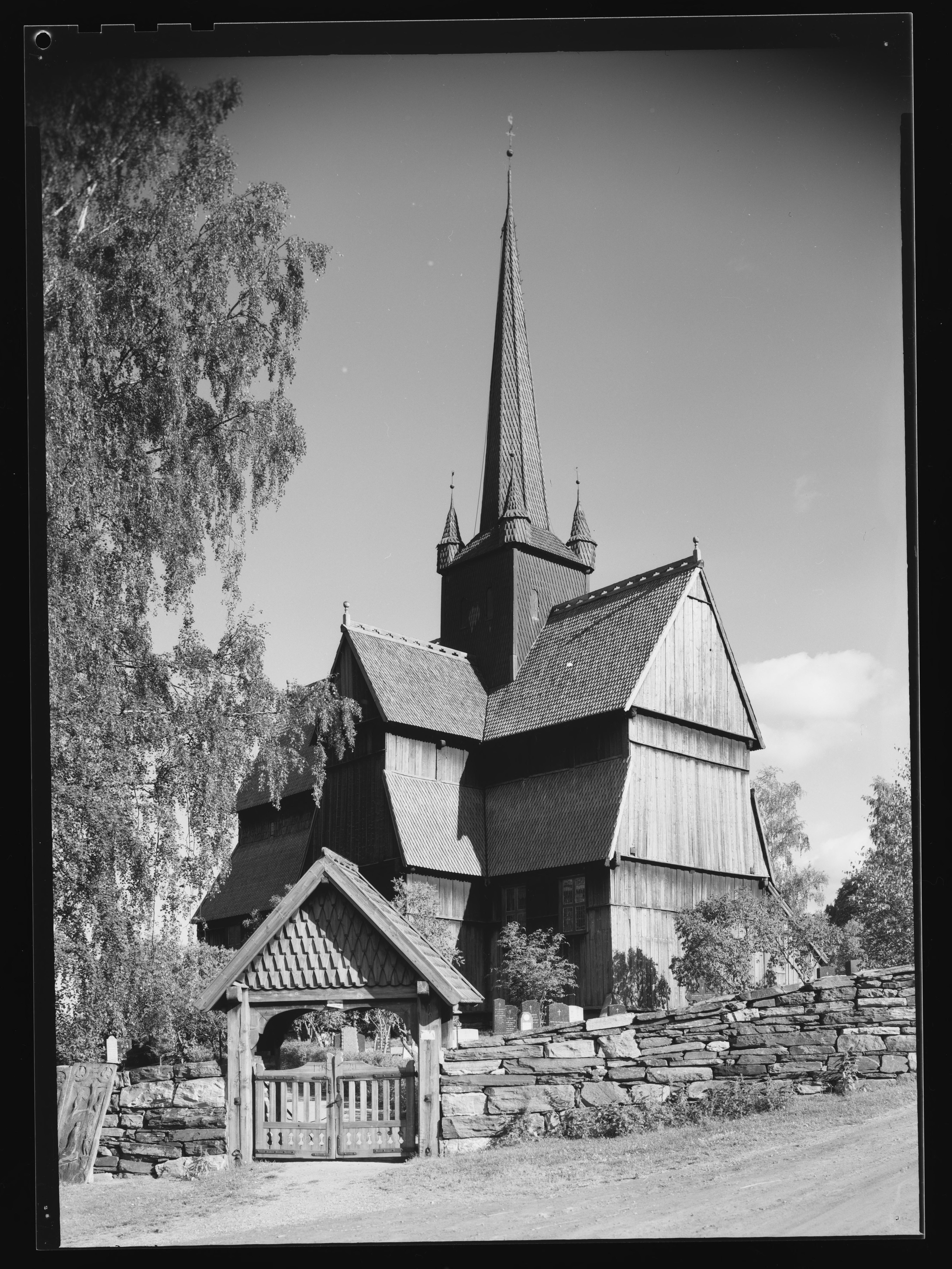

== See also ==
- List of churches in Hamar
