= Kringen =

Kringen is a Norwegian surname. Notable people with the surname include:

- Gøril Kringen (born 1972), Norwegian footballer and coach
- John Kringen, American CIA official
- Olav Kringen (1867–1951), Norwegian newspaper editor

== See also ==
- Battle of Kringen
