= Edvard Storm =

Norwegian poet, songwriter and educator

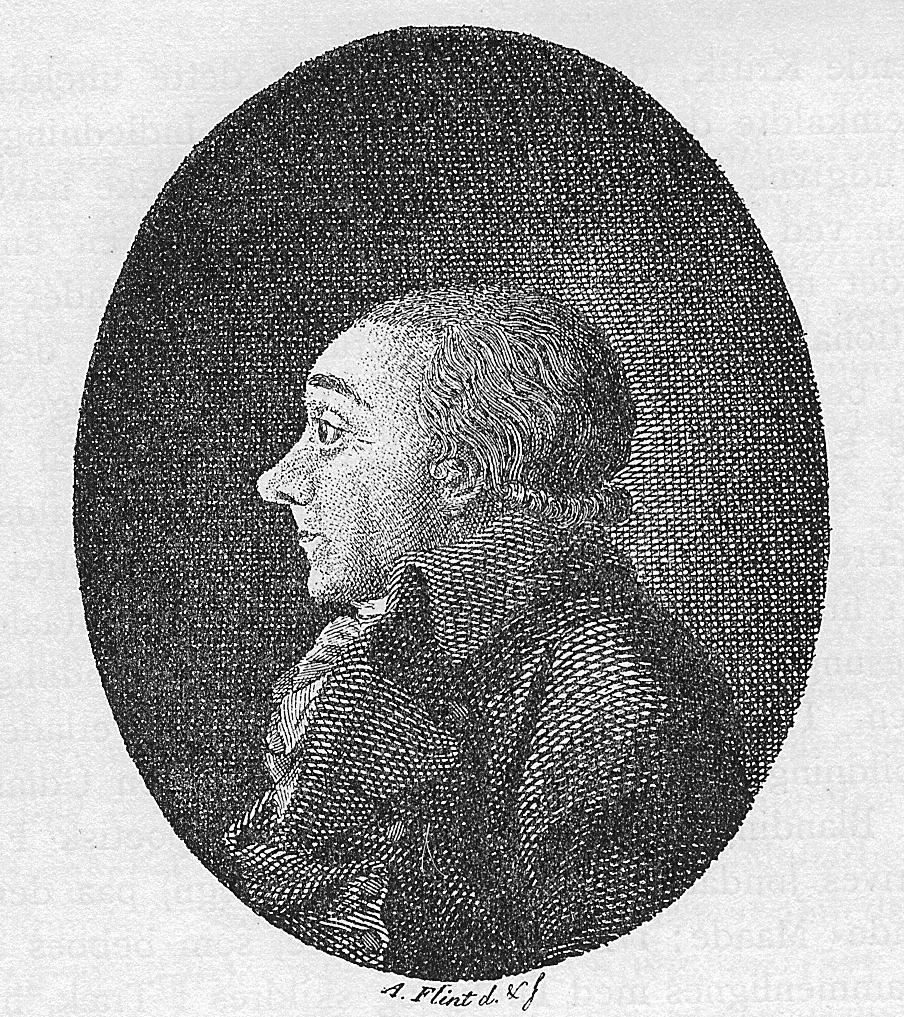
Edvard Storm

Edvard Storm (21 August 1749 – 29 September 1794) was a Norwegian poet, songwriter and educator. His writings were frequently characterized by the Norwegian romantic nationalism common to the age.

== Background ==
Storm was from Vågå in Oppland, Norway. He was the son of Johan Storm (1712–76), the parish priest at Vågå Church, and his second wife, Ingeborg Birgitta Røring (1718–1760). The early years of his life were spent in the Vågå Rectory (Vågåkyrkja). He began formal schooling in 1756 in Christiania (now Oslo). In 1765 he took the entry examination for Copenhagen University, but waited until later to enter. For a period he was a teacher in Lesja, but he returned for 1766–1769 to his childhood home. In July 1769, Storm left home to begin serious study in Copenhagen. It is commonly thought he pursued theology but he never took the official examination. Despite being from Norway, he did not join the Norske Selskab, a literary club formed in 1772 for Norwegian students in Copenhagen which included authors, poets and philosophers. Storm was an admirer of the Danish poet Johannes Ewald and attached himself to Ewald's circle of friends who were members. While in Denmark he wrote nine songs in his local Norwegian dialect before the beginning of the 1770s. These songs were among the seminal works of Norwegian literature in dialect and are often viewed as the best that Storm wrote.

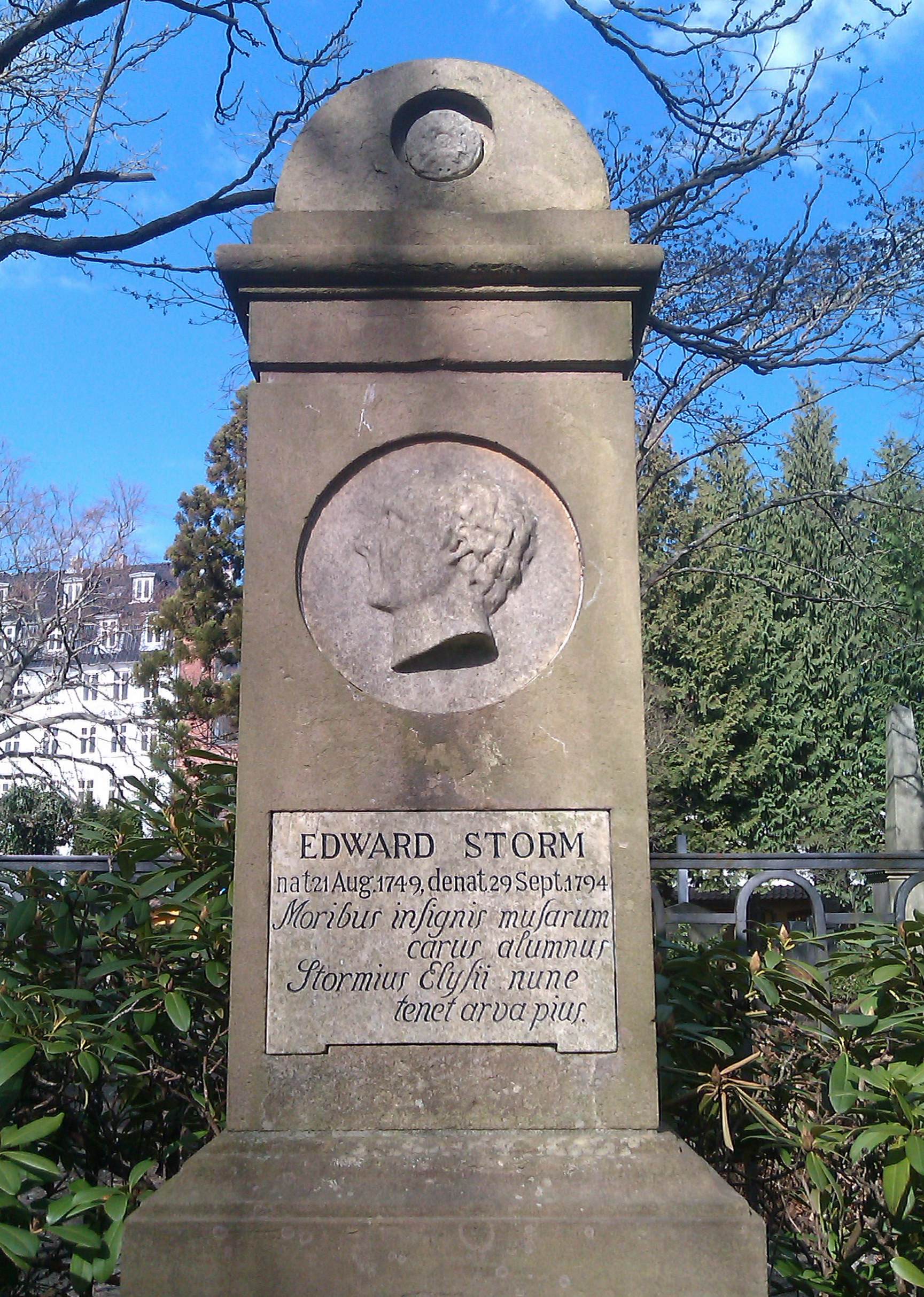
Edward Storm's tombstone at Assistens Cemetery in Copenhagen

== Career ==
Storm returned to his home district in about 1785. From this point forward his work with education was of considerable value. In 1786, a circle of the area's more important men created a secondary school for children (folk school). Storm was a member of the group and came to play an important role in the administration of the school. Among the tasks to which the group dedicated its work was the important establishment of a middle school for children, and in this connection popular lectures were presented for older children and young people on topics from various scientific disciplines. Storm lectured four hours a week on lifemanship (Danish: Leveklogskab), geography, the Danish language, linguistics as well as both Greek and Norse mythologies. Starting in 1790, his ties to the school were more formal as he became a head inspector of sorts. One month before his death he was appointed as one of the directing managers of the Royal Danish Theatre. He was buried at Assistens Cemetery in Copenhagen.

His work included Zinklars vise ("Ballad of Sinclair") written in 1781, celebrating the defeat of a force of Scottish mercenaries led by George Sinclair, a nephew of the Earl of Caithness under the command of Lieutenant Colonel Alexander Ramsay. Local forces were in part inspired by a local peasant girl, Prillar-Guri. The Scots were ambushed in an engagement referred to as the Battle of Kringen.

== Selected works ==
- Bræger, 1774
- Adskilligt paa Vers, 1775
- Infødsretten, 1778
- Fabler og Fortællinger i den Gellertske Smag, 1778
- Samlede Digte, 1785
