= Prillar-Guri =

Legendary norse woman

Prillar-Guri or Prillarguri (also spelled Pillarguri) is a legendary figure who according to oral tradition was a woman from Sel, Norway who played a key role in the Battle of Kringen (Slaget ved Kringen) in August 1612.

== Background ==
Coat of arms for the municipality of Sel (kommune), Norway featuring Pillarguri

Sweden and Denmark-Norway were actively engaged in the Kalmar War. Nearly three hundred conscripts from the Gudbrandsdalen valley had been massacred at Nya Lödöse by the Swedes. In July the Mönnichhoven's march (Mönnichhoven-marsjen) across Norway through Stjørdalen had ravaged the area. Hence a peasant militia force of around 500 decided to ambush the Scottish force (Skottetoget) at Kringen (the narrowest part of the valley). The terrain chosen by the Norwegians made ambush very effective.

The Scottish force were soundly beaten in a manner that took the character of a massacre. The fact that about half the Scots were executed by the Norwegian peasants the day after the battle took place can be a reason why the tradition tries to "smooth over" the grim events. A reason for this reaction may have been rumours of the looting and harrowing done by the Scottish mercenaries during their trip from Romsdalen. Another reason is that the municipalities in the area did not have any capacity to harbour prisoners of war, and the fear of more looting from escaped mercenaries can have given the farmers reason to kill the soldiers on the spot. Eighteen Scotsmen were sent to trial in Denmark, among them Lieutenant Colonel Alexander Ramsay. Some of those were eventually sent home to Scotland. The Norwegian victory over the Scots is celebrated in Otta and Dovre to this day.

== Prillarguri ==
- Guri is a common Norwegian woman's name which has origins in the Old Norse word for good.
- Prillar refers to the horn Guri was supposed to have used. There is an old instrument in Norway named prillarhorn which was a cow-horn which could be played. Prille is a Norwegian term for musical articulation or fingering, especially on the hardanger fiddle.
- According to the oral tradition, Pillarguri placed herself on a promontory on the other side of the river to the advancing Scottish troops. Today the 852-metre (2,795 ft) tall peak is called Pillarguritoppen. She either played her horn to distract them and then moved a piece of clothing to signal the ambush; or else she commenced playing as the signal.
- The official reports and documents describing the Battle of Kringen do not mention Pillarguri. She appears in the oral tradition and in heroic lyrics written as much as 200 years after the event. However females seldom found their way into official documents in the early 17th century.
- In modern illustrations Pillarguri has taken on the form of a young lady with long fair hair, and she is shown playing a lur, a long natural blowing horn historically common in Scandinavia. There are no descriptions whatsoever to support this image, and it can only serve as an example of romanticised national imagination.

== Legacy ==
The story of Pillarguri has been popularized in poems and songs, including a traditional song from the area. Pillarguri first appears in written form in Sagn, samlede i Gudbrandsdalen om Slaget ved Kringen, 26de August 1612 written during 1838 by Hans Peter Schnitler Krag, the minister in Vågå. Prillarguri became more commonly known in the 1880s from a novel by the popular Norwegian author Rudolf Muus. Pillarguri appeared as well in poetry by Edvard Storm, Henrik Wergeland, and Gerhard Schöning.

Her name was also remembered in a number of Hardanger fiddle dance tunes, mostly in old tunings. The fact that the fiddle tunes in question seem to be fairly old, most of them not younger than 1750, should strengthen the theory of existence prior to the romantic nationalist era in Norway.

A statue depicting Pillarguri is located in the community of Otta, Norway. The Pillarguri prize (Pillarguriprisen) is awarded in conjunction with the annual Pillarguri Festival at Otta. She was also reproduced on a memorial erected in 1912 in connection with the 300-year anniversary of the battle. Pillar-guri is also depicted on the coat of arms of Sel Municipality in Innlandet county, Norway.

== See also ==
- Landvættir
- Rå

== Other sources ==
- Michell, Thomas History of the Scottish Expedition to Norway in 1612 (T. Nelson and Sons, London. 1886) ISBN 978-1-176-69071-4
- Gjerset, Knut History of the Norwegian People (The MacMillan Company, 1915, Volume I, pages 197 – 204) ISBN 978-1-144-62811-4
- Haugen, Einar Norwegian-English Dictionary (University of Wisconsin Press. 1967) ISBN 978-0-299-03874-8
