= Lars Gunnarson Hågå =

Norwegian farmer and lensmann

- Born: Before 1580
- Died: After 1645
- Occupations: Farmer; Lensmann
- Known for: The Battle of Kringen (1612)

Lars Gunnarson Hågå (before 1580 – after 1645) was a Norwegian farmer and lensmann in Lesja in Gudbrandsdalen.

He is remembered for his leading role during the Battle of Kringen in 1612, for which he was rewarded the farms of Hågå and Landheim, former Crown land, from the King.
