= Werner Olsen =

Werner Olsen (c. 1600 – 1682) was a Norwegian church builder and a tower builder with a legendary reputation. He is also known as Werner Olsen Skurdal in reference to the last residence he lived at.

== Life ==
Olsen was born in the prestegjeld of Ringsaker. He lived during a turning point in Norwegian church-building history. He participated in rebuilding many churches, and was a builder that found good solutions to his tasks both technically and architecturally. Olsen was very active in the Gudbrand Valley (Norwegian: Gudbrandsdalen). For a while he lived at Øvre Gaalaas, near Furnes. In 1647 he worked at Odenrud (in what is now Sør-Fron Municipality), where he was nicknamed mester Werner tårnbygger 'Master Werner the tower-builder'. He gave up his leasehold in 1665 and shortly thereafter purchased the Sygard Skurdal farm in Sør-Fron, where he lived until his death in 1682.

Little is known about construction activity in Norway at the time in general, and little is known about Werner Olsen's early life. He may have learned his timbering skills in Denmark or Germany, or there may also have been more craftsmen engaged in this work in Norway than is known today.

== Known works ==
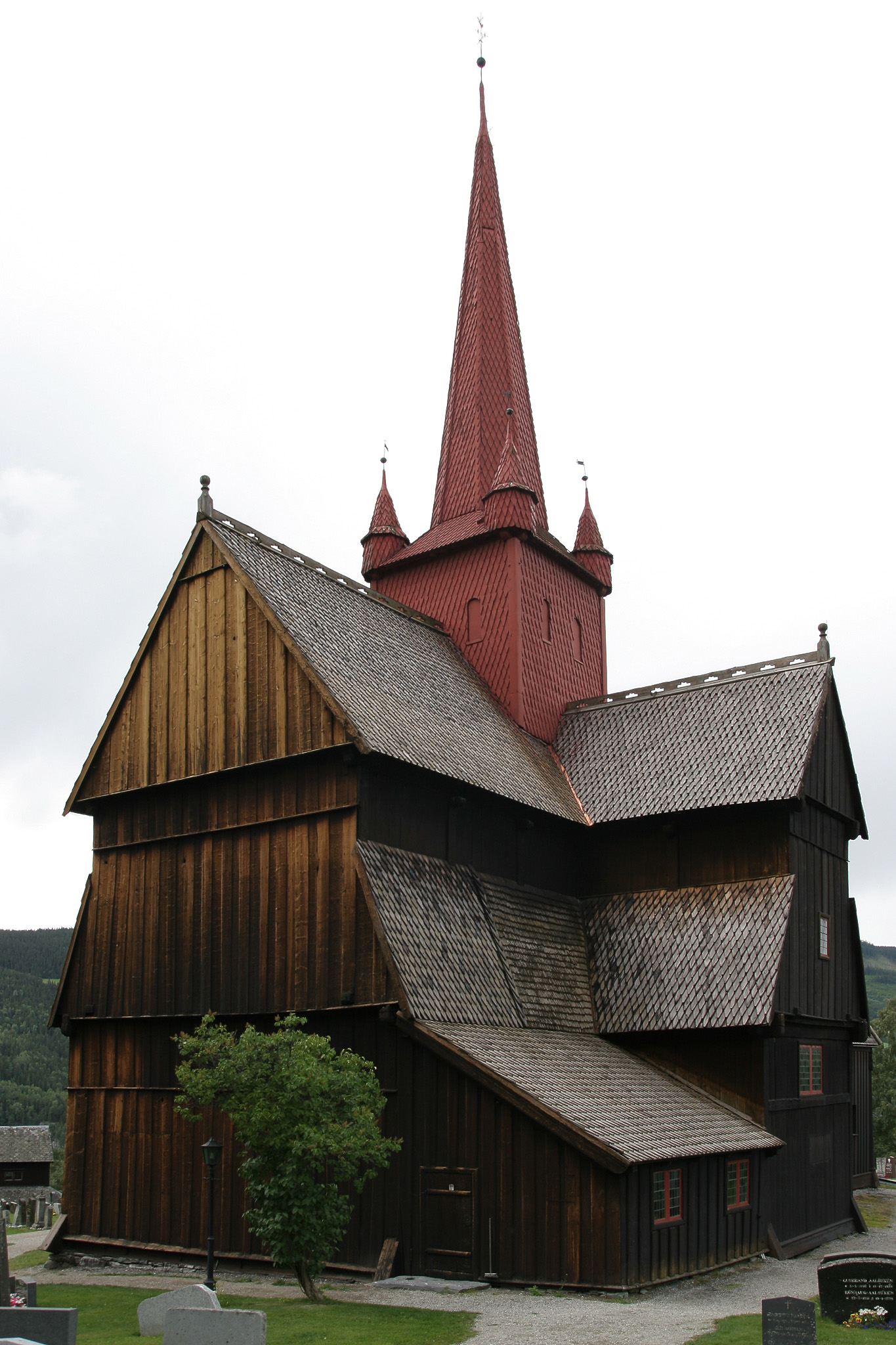
Ringebu Stave Church

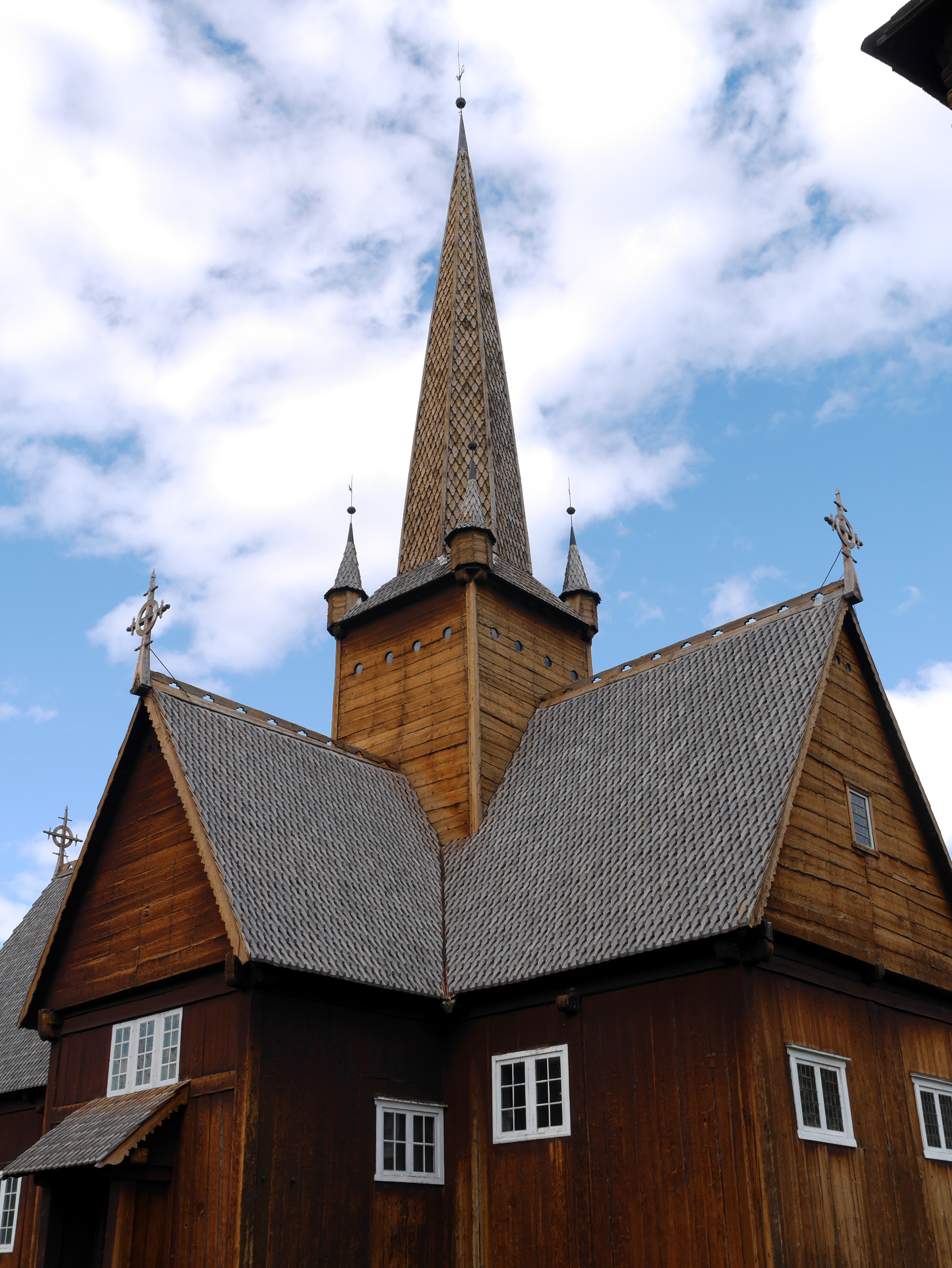
Vågå Church

Church towers created by Werner Olsen

Werner Olsen's first documented building project was the conversion of Vågå Church to a cruciform church in 1626–1628. It is a timber-framed building, in which material from the earlier stave church was reused. The basic plan is a Latin cross. The tower stands above the center of the cross, with a tall main tower and four small side towers, a legacy of Gothic tower architecture. Olsen used the same plan when he converted Ringebu Stave Church into a cruciform church in 1630–1631. There the old stave church became the basis for the layout of the Latin cross. The technique is a paneled timbering, in which the timbering is marked by extensive use of slanted rails at a 45° angle up and down at the timber posts. The stave church has an elevated central area, and the basilica-like form was also continued in the timbering in the extension. The new parts thus coordinate well with the old parts of the church. As with Vågå Church, Olsen added a tall tower with four small side towers.

In 1630, Olsen also built a new tower for his childhood church, Nes Church in Hedmark. That tower was destroyed in a fire in 1770 caused by a lightning strike.

In 1634, Olsen worked for the first time in Lom, where he extended the stave church's nave to the west using the log construction technique. He also raised the central part of Lom Stave Church, and the basilica-like form was extended into the log-construction additions. In 1635 Olsen was active at Dale Church in Luster, where he added a new tower to the church. The tower has not been preserved. He is also credited with building a tower on Nidaros Cathedral in Trondheim in 1638. In 1652 Olsen built a new high tower at Ringsaker Church, but the tower was destroyed by winds in 1669. In 1652 he built a new tower on Follebu Church in Gausdal, where his initials are carved into one of the roof's rafter posts.

In 1663, Lom Stave Church was further expanded, and Olsen was again engaged to carry out the construction work. A transept was built, constructed with a timbering technique that partially reused material from the stave church. Reusing the material was economically sound, and it also provided a good connection between the original and new parts. In addition to the transept, a new tower was also built, of the same type as that at Vågå Church and Ringebu Stave Church.

== Attributed works ==
Werner Olsen's reputation as a church builder has led to him being credited with most of the construction carried out in the Gudbrand Valley during his time. Work on Fåberg Church, Listad Church in Sør-Fron, Kvam Church in Nord-Fron, and Lesja Church has been attributed to him. None of this work has been preserved and the source material is scant. Olsen's son Oluf Wernersen carried on the tower-building tradition in the family.
