= George Sinclair (mercenary) =

Scottish mercenary of the Kalmar War

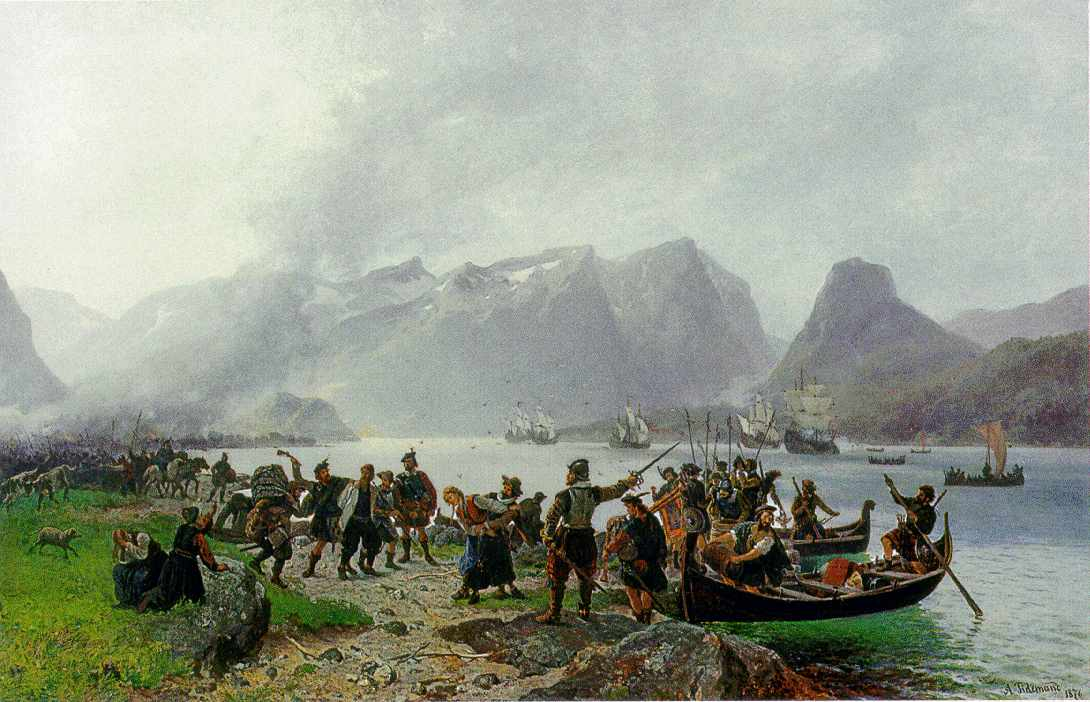
An Adolph Tidemand painting representing Sinclair's forces landing in Norway

George Sinclair (c. 1580–1612) was a Scottish mercenary who fought and died in the Kalmar War. He is remembered in popular song in Norway and the Faroe Islands, through the ballad Sinklars Visa.

== Biography ==
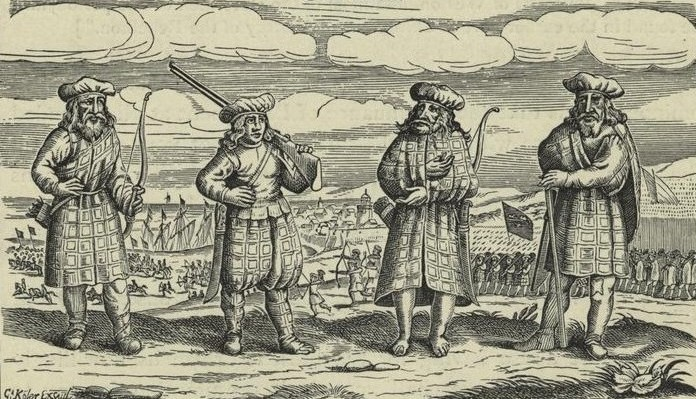
Sinclair's men would have looked similar to these Scottish soldiers in the service of Gustavus Adolphus

George Sinclair was a nephew of George Sinclair, 5th Earl of Caithness. He was educated at Edinburgh High School and in 1595 participated in a mutiny which ended after the city officers stormed the school; according to a Norwegian source Sinclair shot a bailie with a pistol.

James VI and I, the brother-in-law of Christian IV of Denmark, forbade Scottish mercenaries from joining the Swedes in the Kalmar War (1611-1613). But Sinclair and his men, led by Lieutenant-Colonel Alexander Ramsay, went to Romsdalen in Norway anyway. They landed at Klungnes on the shore of the Romsdalsfjord on 19 or 20 August 1612, in two ships and with around 300 men. A week after they landed they were engaged by a Norwegian militia of farmers, with only a few Scotsmen escaping with their lives, in what became known as the Battle of Kringen. Sinclair was shot by Berdon Segelstad, a Norwegian militiaman, with a silver button. He was buried at the old Kvam Church, and a memorial stone put over his grave remains there still.

== Legacy ==
Sinclair's story, as Sinklars Visa, is memorialized in folk songs in Norway and in one of the Kvæði, the ballads of Faroese folk culture. Faroese folk metal band Týr adapted Sinklars Visa for a modern metal audience; the song is an audience favorite.

Sinclair is also remembered in the poem "The Ballad of George Sinclair" translated into English from the original Danish/Norwegian and written by Edvard Storm, in 1781.

Childe Sinclair and his menyie steered
Across the salt sea waves;
But at Kringellens' mountain gorge
They filled untimely graves.

They crossed the stormy waves so blue,
for Swedish gold to fight;
May burning curses on them fall
That strike not for the right!

The horned moon is gleaming red,
The waves are rolling deep;
A mermaid trolled her demon lay -
Childe Sinclair woke from sleep.

Turn round, turn round thou Scottish youth,
Or loud thy sire shall mourn;
For if thou touchest Norway's strand,
Thou never shall return.

Henrik Wergeland wrote a historical tragedy of the incident, Sinklars Død (Death of Sinclair), in about 1840. Wergeland also refers to the battle in his poem "Norges Fjelde" ("mountains of Norway"), where he calls the lumber barricade used in the ambush a "barricade of freedom". Wergeland's tragedy, in turn, was one of the inspirations for Henrik Ibsen's first play, Catiline.

Victorian antiquarians, in the late 19th century, named the "Sinclair Hilt" for George Sinclair, using it to denote Scandinavian swords that "bear a certain resemblance" to swords used in the Scottish Highlands in the 17th and 18th centuries.

Captured Scottish weapons, including a pistol, a lochabar axe and several basket hilt claymores, were put on display at the Gudbrandsdal Museum, Kvam, to commemorate the battle.
