= Dale Church (Luster) =

Church in Vestland, Norway

- Dale kyrkje
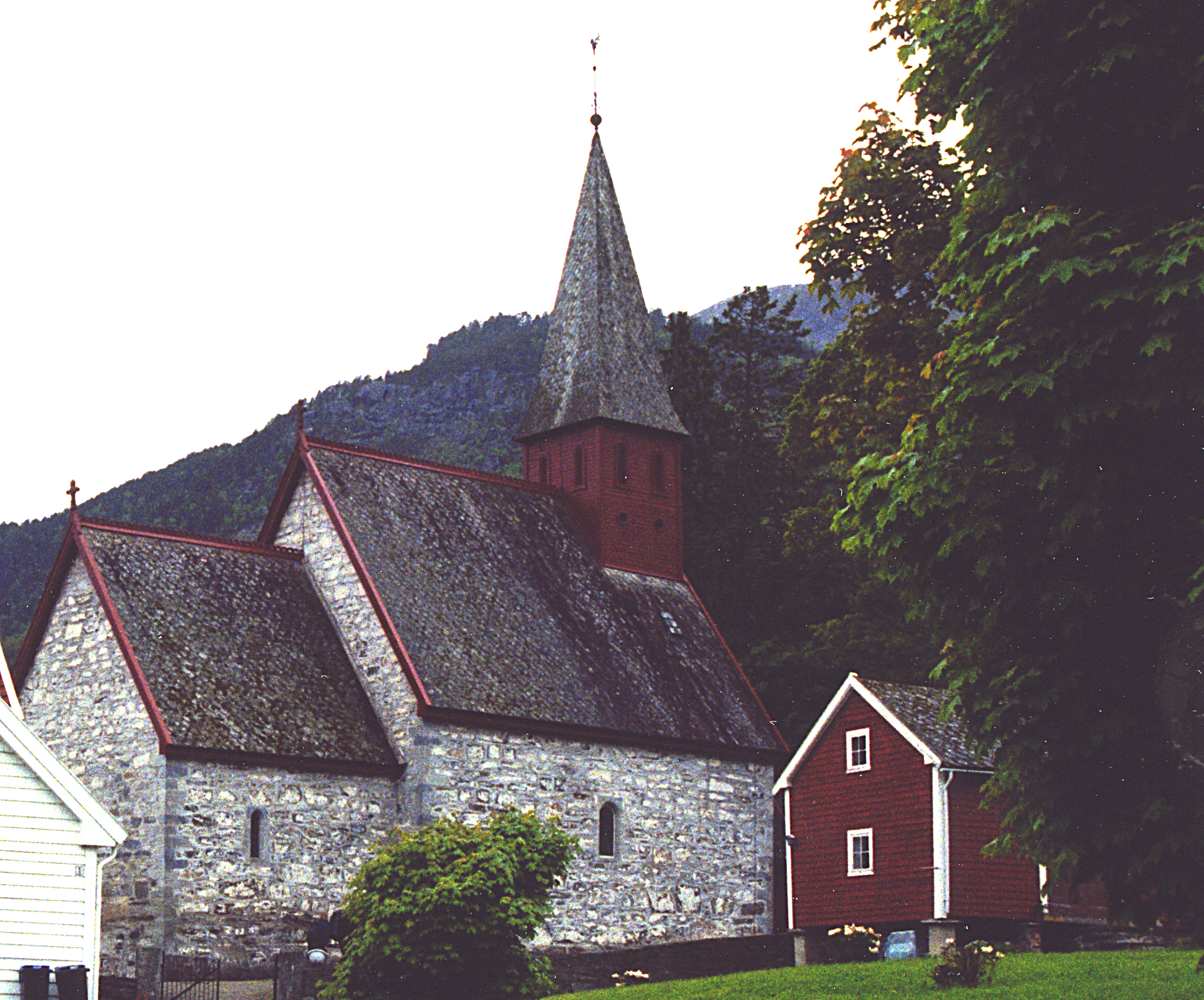
- View of the church
- Dale Church
- 61°26′29″N 7°27′19″E
- Location: Luster Municipality, Vestland
- Country: Norway
- Denomination: Church of Norway
- Previous denomination: Catholic Church
- Churchmanship: Evangelical Lutheran

History
- Status: Parish church
- Founded: c. 1250
- Consecrated: c. 1250

Architecture
- Functional status: Active
- Architectural type: Long church
- Completed: c. 1250 (776 years ago)

Specifications
- Capacity: 200
- Materials: Stone

Administration
- Diocese: Bjørgvin bispedømme
- Deanery: Sogn prosti
- Parish: Dale
- Norwegian Cultural Heritage Site
- Type: Church
- Status: Automatically protected
- ID: 84013

Dale Church (Norwegian: Dale kyrkje) is a parish church of the Church of Norway in Luster Municipality in Vestland county, Norway. It is located in the village of Luster on the western shore of the Lustrafjorden. It is the church for the Dale parish which is part of the Sogn prosti (deanery) in the Diocese of Bjørgvin. The red and white, stone church was built in a long church design around the year 1240 using designs by an unknown architect. The church seats about 200 people.

== History ==
The earliest existing historical records of the church date back to the year 1306, but it was likely built about 80 years earlier (during the first half of the 13th century). Dale Church in Luster reflects both Romanesque and Gothic styles. The medieval-era church was dedicated to Saint Nicholas. Samples of the wood in the roof over the nave are dated to 1220–1229, so that may be the time that the church was originally constructed, however the church traditionally has used the date 1250 for its year of construction (the 750th anniversary was celebrated in 2000). Construction includes granite in cavity walls with soapstone corners and frames. The church has a rectangular nave that measured about 14 by 11 metres (46 ft × 36 ft) and a choir that measured about 8 by 7.5 metres (26 ft × 25 ft). The church is endowed with soapstone sculptures and preserved interiors from the Middle Ages. The Gothic west portal dates to c. 1250. The church porch and the bell tower above the entrance in the west were built around the year 1635 by Werner Olsen. Henrik Murmeister installed larger windows in the church in 1696-1698. During the 18th century, the tower was torn down and replaced with a new wooden tower.

In 1814, this church served as an election church (Norwegian: valgkirke). Together with more than 300 other parish churches across Norway, it was a polling station for elections to the 1814 Norwegian Constituent Assembly which wrote the Constitution of Norway. This was Norway's first national elections. Each church parish was a constituency that elected people called "electors" who later met together in each county to elect the representatives for the assembly that was to meet at Eidsvoll Manor later that year.

The church was restored in 1903 under the direction of architect Jens Zetlitz Monrad Kielland. During this renovation, the church porch was torn down and rebuilt.

=== Interior ===
Furnishings for Dale Church are from various eras. The baptismal font from the 1200s is of soapstone and is shaped as a four-leaf clover. The pulpit is in Renaissance style from the 1600s, while the baroque altarpiece and memory boards are from around 1700. The pulpit has pictures of evangelists in the side panels together with depictions of the Crucifixion with Mary and John the Evangelist at foot of the cross, flanked by Moses and John the Baptist. The choir wall is decorated with frescoes from the late 1500s. The bride bench dates from the 1100s and the crucifix from the 1200s.

== Media gallery ==
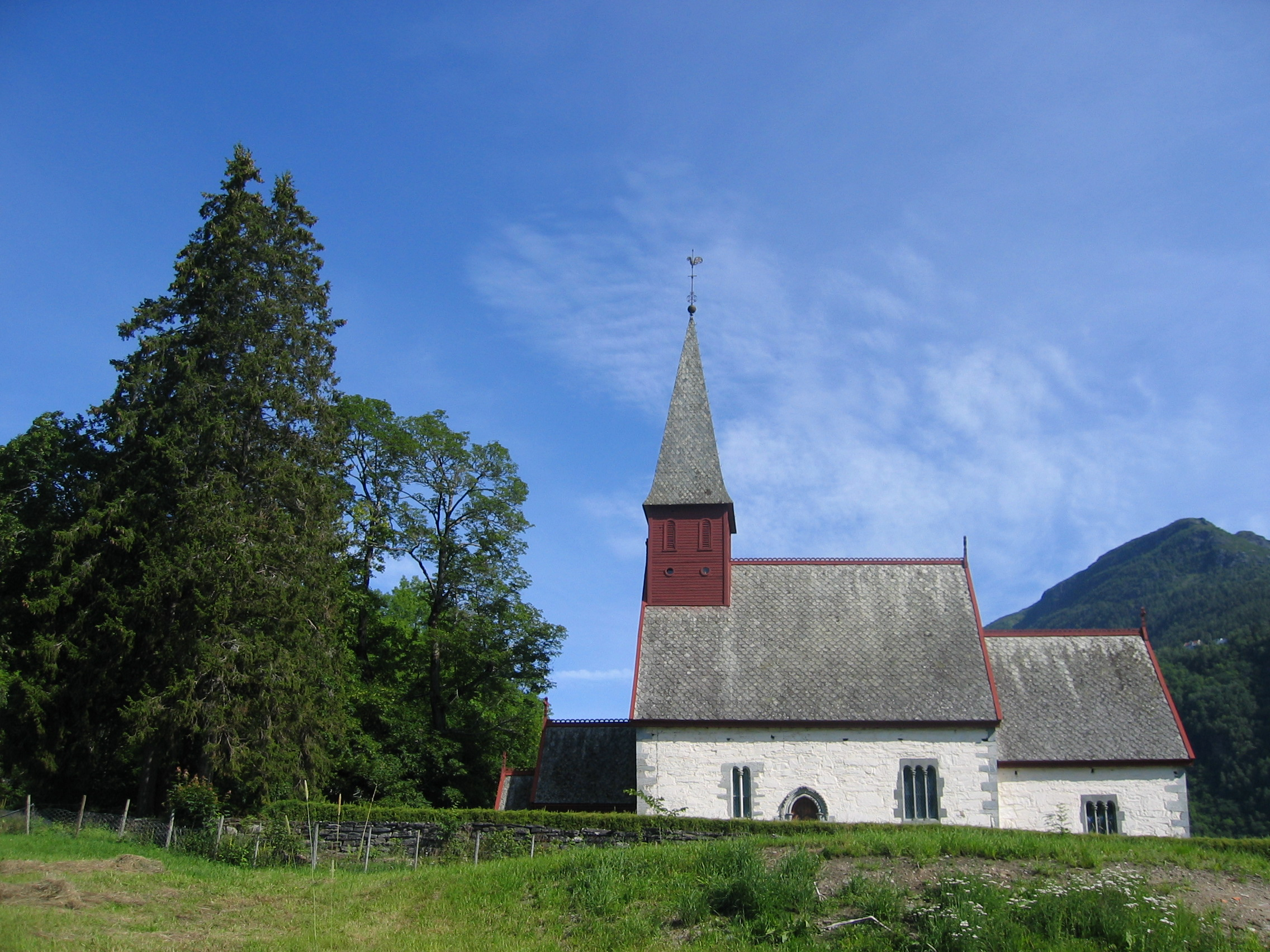
Exterior view of the church

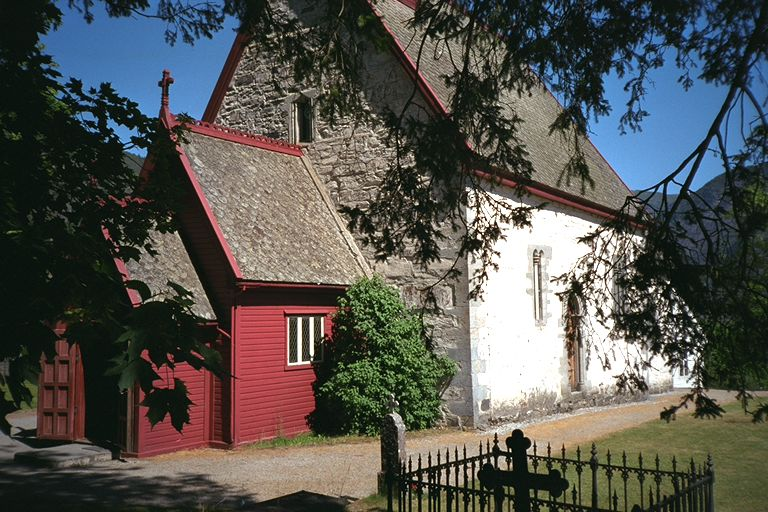
Side view of the church

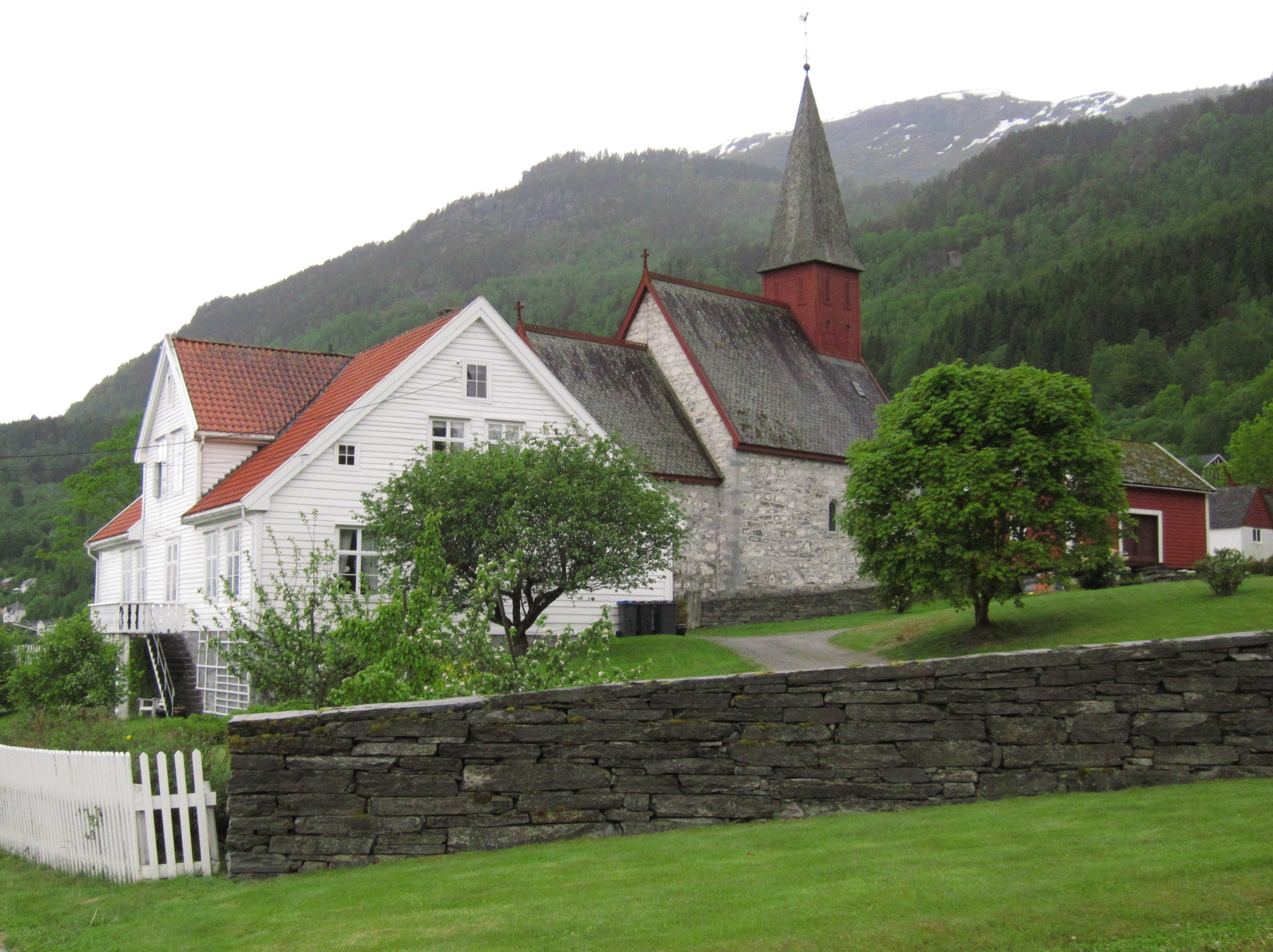
Church with parsonage

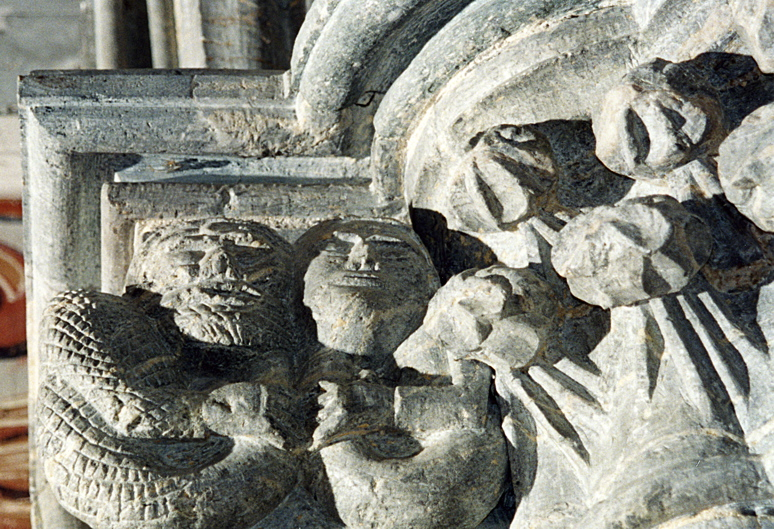
Soapstone carved art work

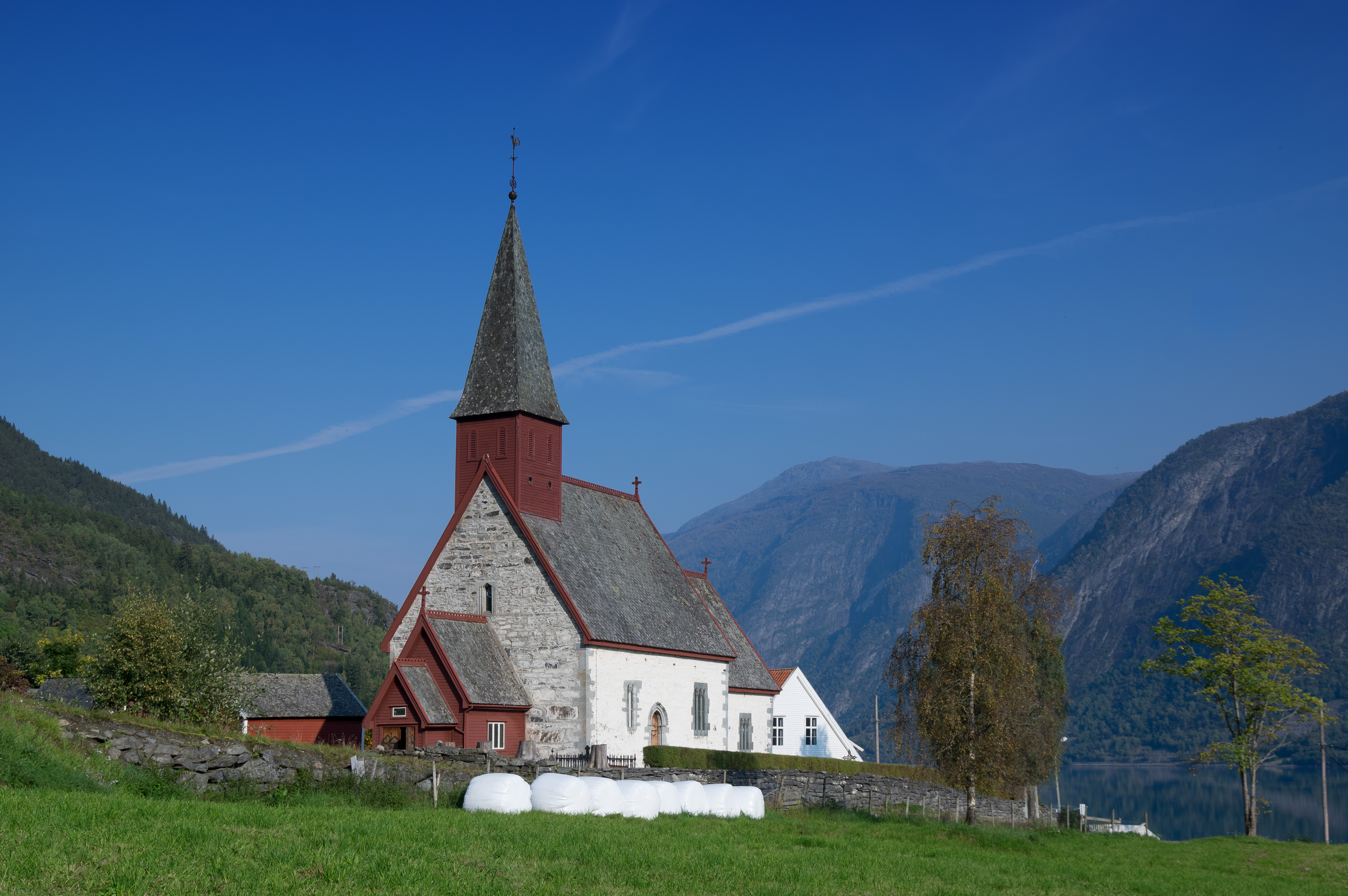
Church and churchyard

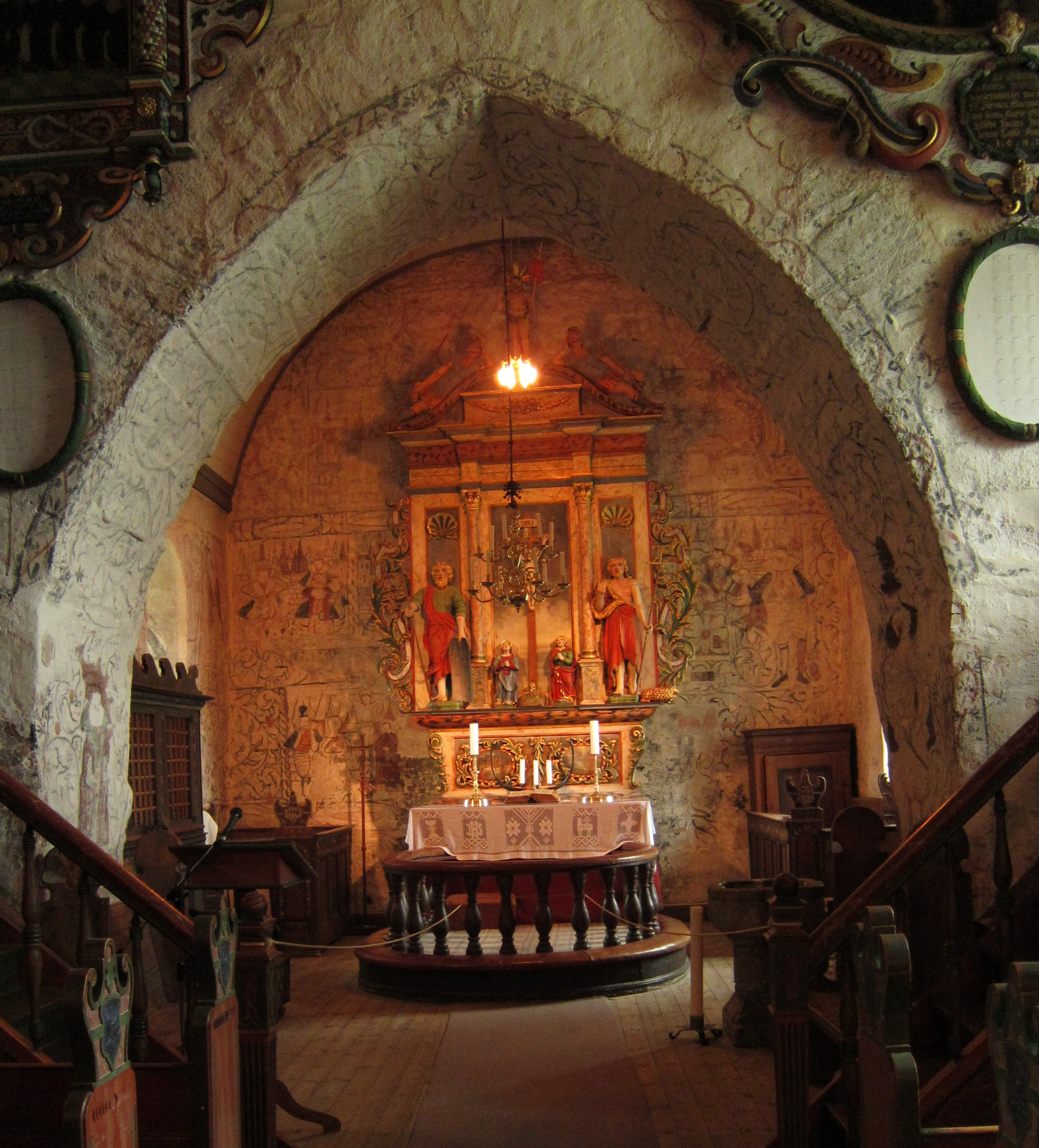
Interior view of the church

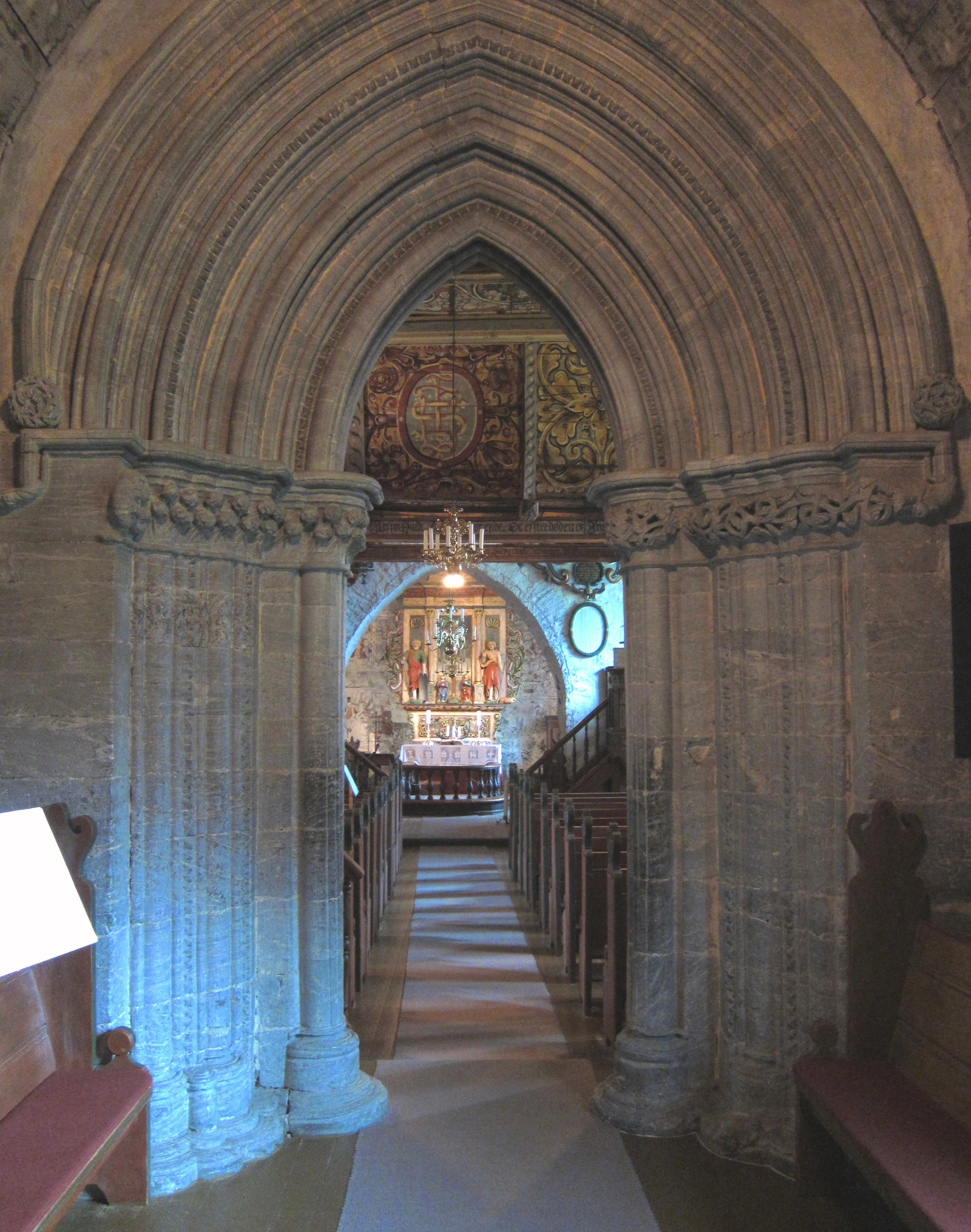
Soapstone portal in the church

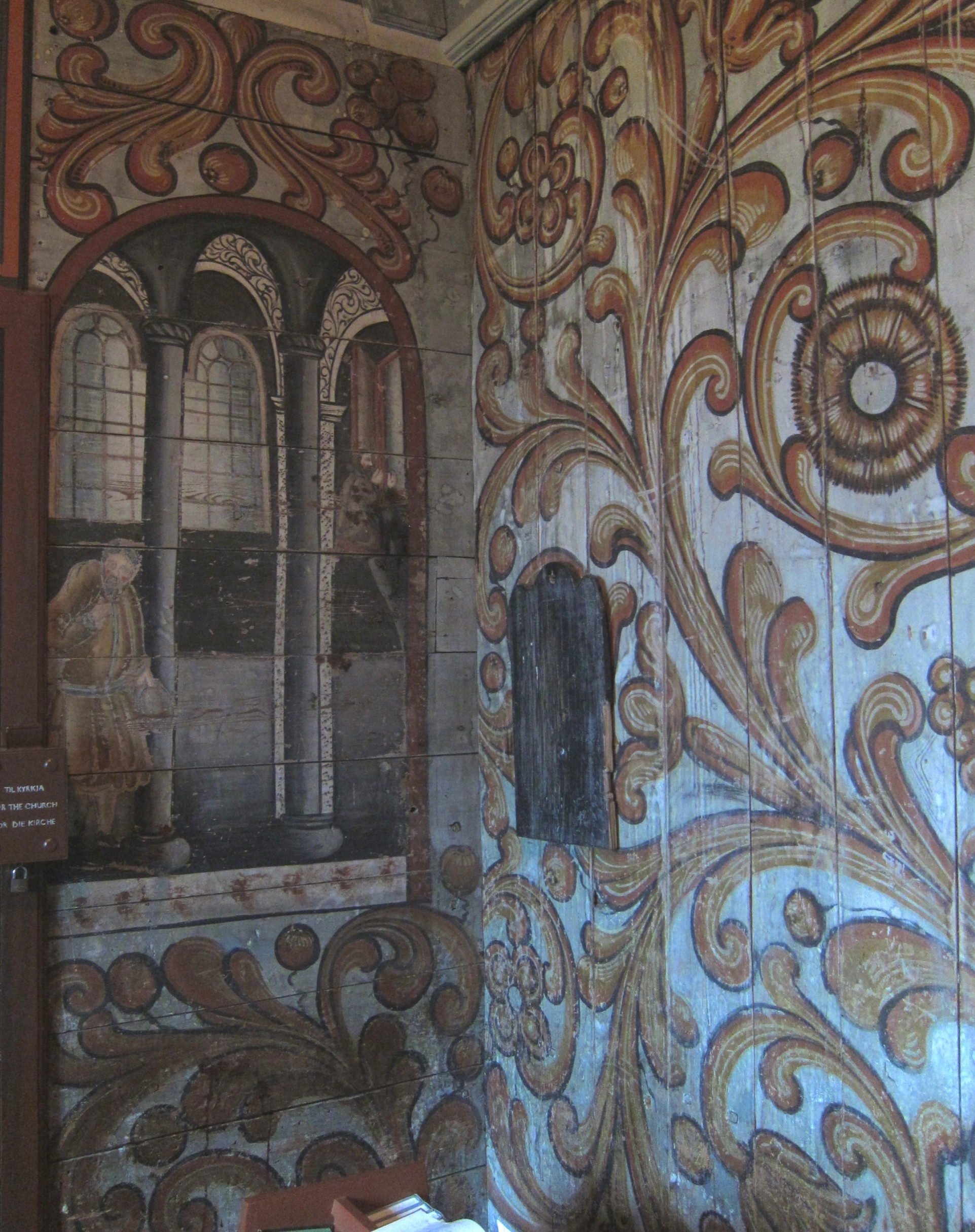
Rosemaling inside church porch

== See also ==
- List of churches in Bjørgvin
