= Jo Gjende =

Norwegian outdoorsman

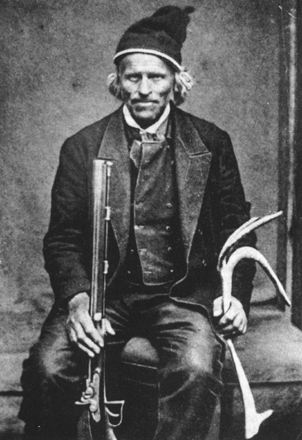
Jo Gjende

Jo Gjende (1794 – 27 February 1884) was a Norwegian outdoorsman and freethinker. He is believed to have been the model for Henrik Ibsen's Peer Gynt.

He was born in Vågå, the son of Tjøstolv Olsson Kleppe of Sygaard (a well-known rabble-rouser, also called "Galin-Tjøstolv", who died in 1797) and Marit Pedersdotter (died 1803) from Horgje in Heidal. He had four siblings. He lived during the period 1803–18 with his maternal aunt on Heringstad farm in Heidal and later took over the farm.

He was well known for reindeer hunting and sharpshooting in the Jotunheimen mountains and built many cabins or huts at Lake Gjende. He moved there in 1842. In 1850 he bought the mountain farm Brurusten in Murudal from Jakob Kleiven.

He took the name John Gjendin, and shortened it to Jo Gjende in his later days.

He was publicly skeptical about established Christianity. Occupied by natural philosophy, he participated frequently in discussions with the local minister. As a result, he was recognized as a freethinker.

He died on the Brurusten farm in Murudal, and was buried at Vågå Church. On his grave is a small soapstone monument, which shows a wild reindeer herd in flight, after a painting by Gerhard Munthe.
