= Lom Stave Church =

Church in Innlandet, Norway

- Lom stavkyrkje
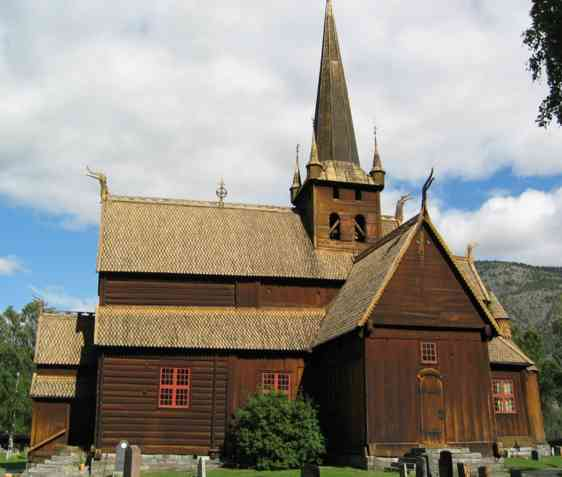
- View of the church
- Lom Stave Church
- 61°50′23″N 8°33′58″E
- Location: Lom Municipality, Innlandet
- Country: Norway
- Denomination: Church of Norway
- Previous denomination: Catholic Church
- Churchmanship: Evangelical Lutheran

History
- Status: Parish church
- Founded: 11th century
- Consecrated: c. 1170
- Events: 1663: renovation

Architecture
- Functional status: Active
- Architectural type: Cruciform
- Style: Stave church
- Completed: c. 1170 (856 years ago)

Specifications
- Capacity: 350
- Materials: Wood

Administration
- Diocese: Hamar bispedømme
- Deanery: Nord-Gudbrandsdal prosti
- Parish: Lom
- Norwegian Cultural Heritage Site
- Type: Church
- Status: Automatically protected
- ID: 84322

Lom Stave Church (Norwegian: Lom stavkyrkje) is a parish church of the Church of Norway in Lom Municipality in Innlandet county, Norway. It is located in the village of Fossbergom in the traditional district of Gudbrandsdal. It is the church for the Lom parish which is part of the Nord-Gudbrandsdal prosti (deanery) in the Diocese of Hamar. The brown, wooden stave church was built around the year 1170 using plans drawn up by an unknown architect. The church seats about 350 people.

The church is a triple nave stave church that uses free standing inner columns to support a raised section in the ceiling of the main nave. This type of church is amongst the oldest of the Norwegian stave churches. The church was built in a valley off of the main Gudbrandsdalen valley, about 60 kilometers (37 mi) west of Otta. This stave church is one of a very few remaining stave churches where the original medieval crest with a dragon head still survives. This item was removed from the church in the 1950s and replaced with a copy, and the original is now in a museum.

== History ==
The first church at Lom was a small wooden post church that was built during the 11th century. Not much is known of the first church. Evidence of this church was discovered underneath the present church during an archaeological investigation in 1973. This first building measured about 9.5 by 5.2 metres (31 ft × 17 ft) with a rectangular nave with a smaller, narrower choir on one end. Around the years 1160–1170, the old church was torn down and a larger, wooden stave church was built on the same site. Dendrochronological dating of the church shows that the wood was cut around 1157–1158, so the church must have been constructed after that time. Originally, the church was built in a long church design with stave posts and an open-air corridor surrounding the church (similar to the existing corridors surrounding the Borgund Stave Church).

During the 17th century, the church underwent significant changes. The chancel was redecorated in 1608. In 1634, the nave was enlarged with a timber-framed addition to the west in order to accommodate more people in the church. This was a temporary fix, however, and after about 30 years, the church underwent a large renovation. The master builder Werner Olsen (ca. 1600–1682) was hired to lead this remodeling project. He was active in the Gudbrandsdalen region during this time and had previously worked on Vågå Church (1626–28) and Ringebu Stave Church (1630). The project was carried out in 1663. It included removing all of the open-air corridors surrounding the church. The church was enlarged by adding a transept wing to the north and south of the nave, creating a cruciform floor plan. This new addition was built using the old stave construction methods so it would look like the rest of the old stave church. A sacristy was also built on the north side of the choir during this project. Larger windows were installed in the church at this time as well. The interior of the nave had a flat ceiling installed, covering up the vaulted ceiling that had been in place before.

In 1814, this church served as an election church (Norwegian: valgkirke). Together with more than 300 other parish churches across Norway, it was a polling station for elections to the 1814 Norwegian Constituent Assembly which wrote the Constitution of Norway. This was Norway's first national elections. Each church parish was a constituency that elected people called "electors" who later met together in each county to elect the representatives for the assembly that was to meet at Eidsvoll Manor later that year.

A complete restoration of the building took place in 1933. In 1973, the church underwent another large renovation with the goal of improving the thermal insulation of the building. The floors were removed and before rebuilding them, a large archaeological excavation was conducted to investigate the history of the church. The excavations uncovered artifacts including more than 2,000 coins. Also, evidence of the previous church building on the same site was uncovered, dating the establishment of the church to the 11th century. Afterwards, new insulated floors were built inside the church. In 2010, the exterior of the church was tarred again, giving it a much darker appearance.

== Media gallery ==
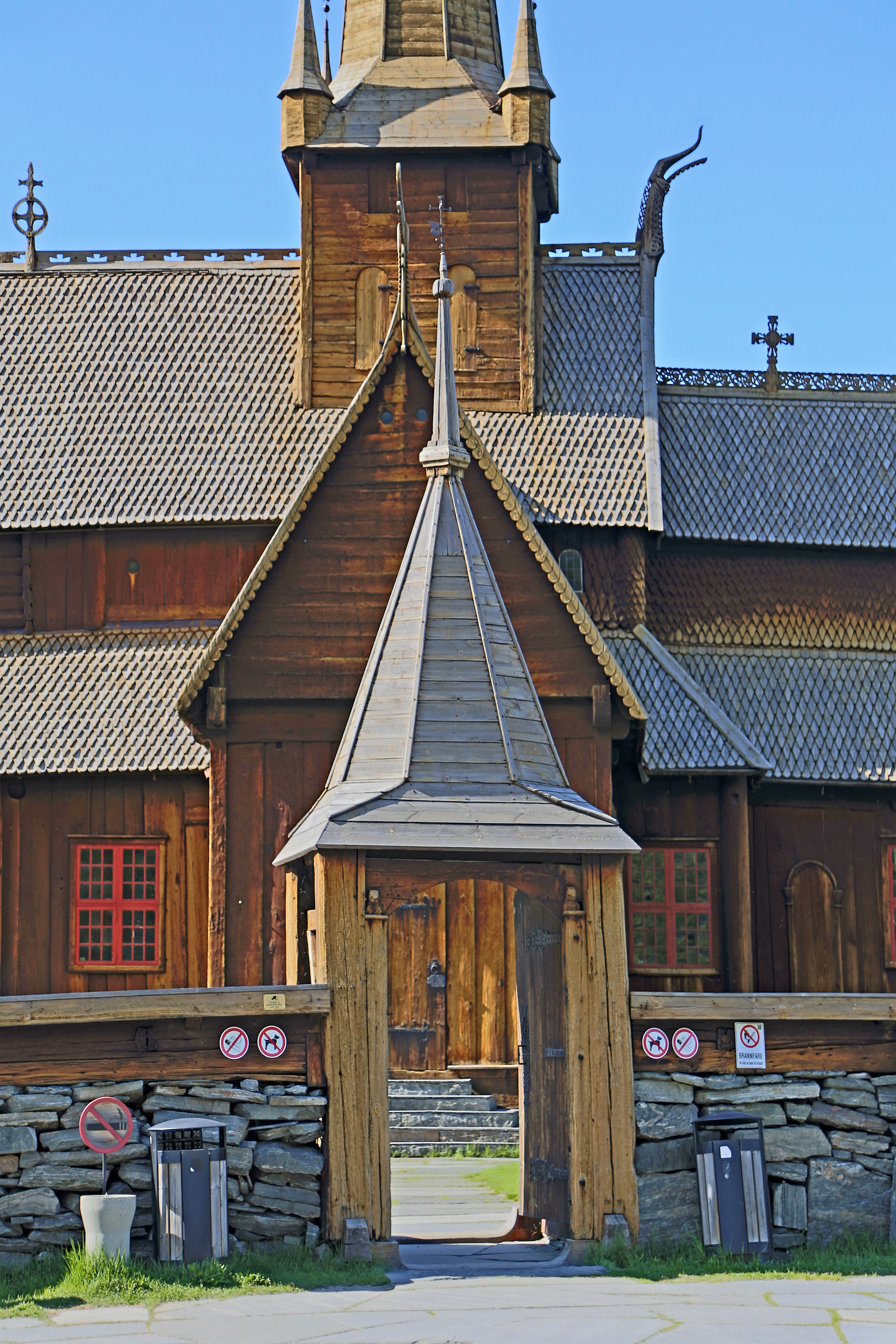
Main entrance

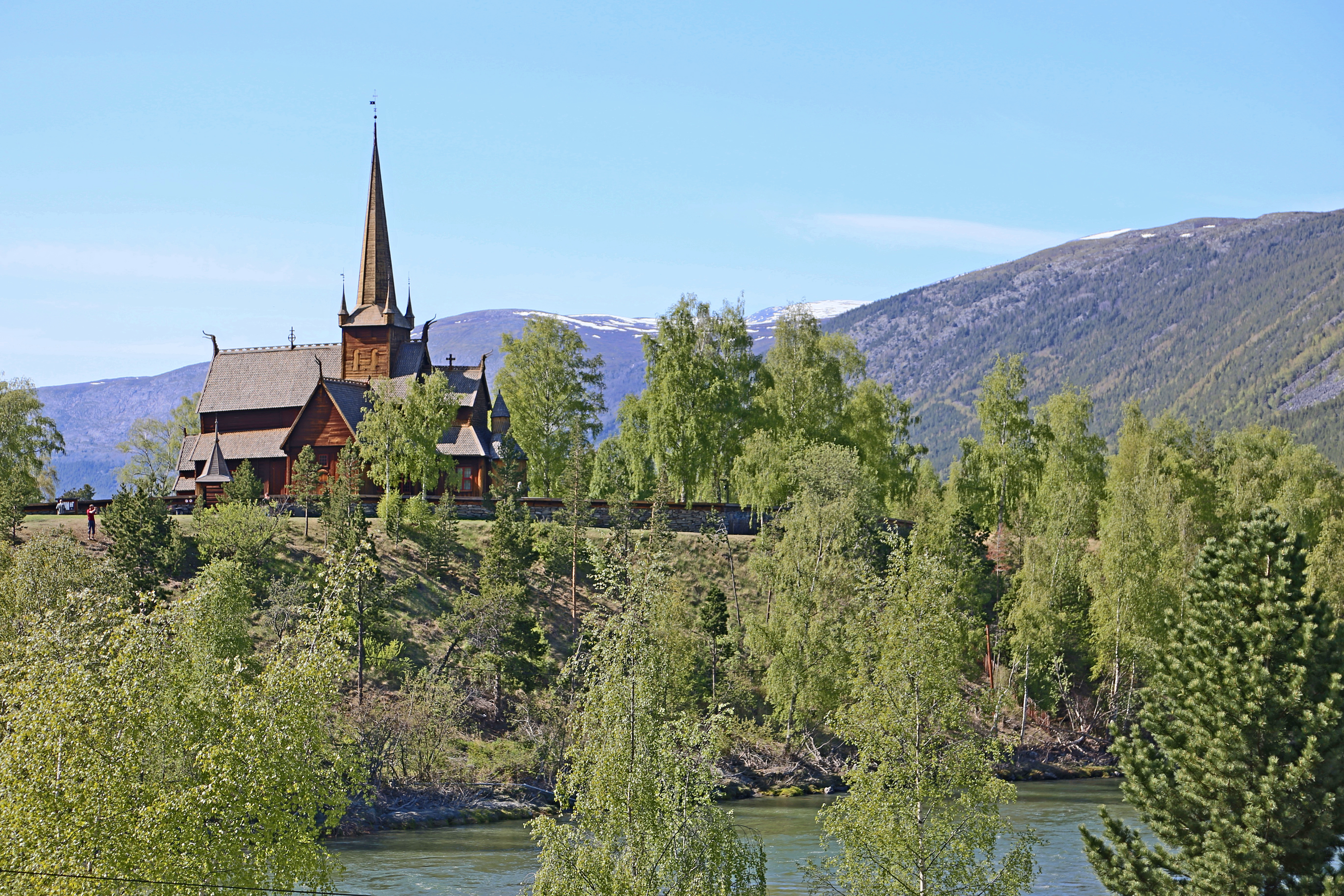
View of the church

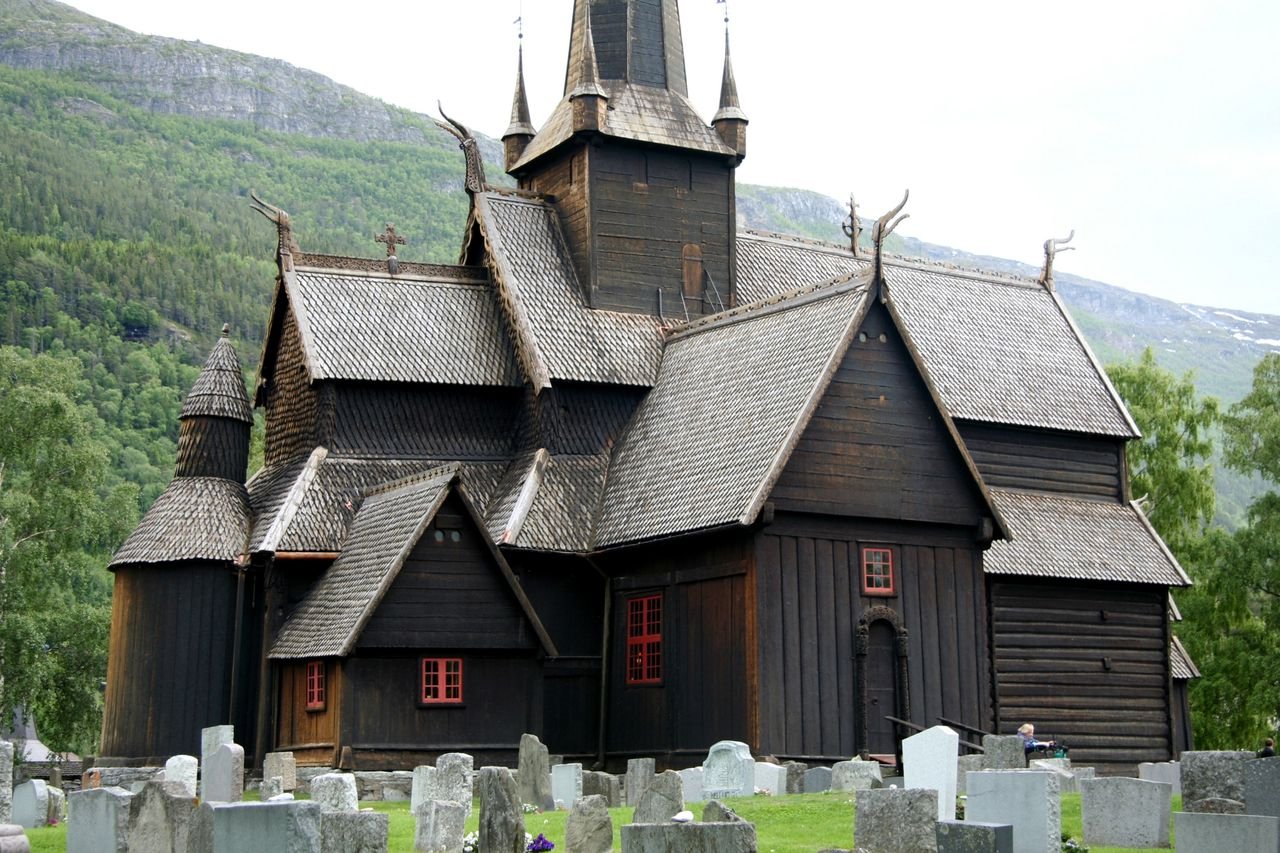
Exterior view

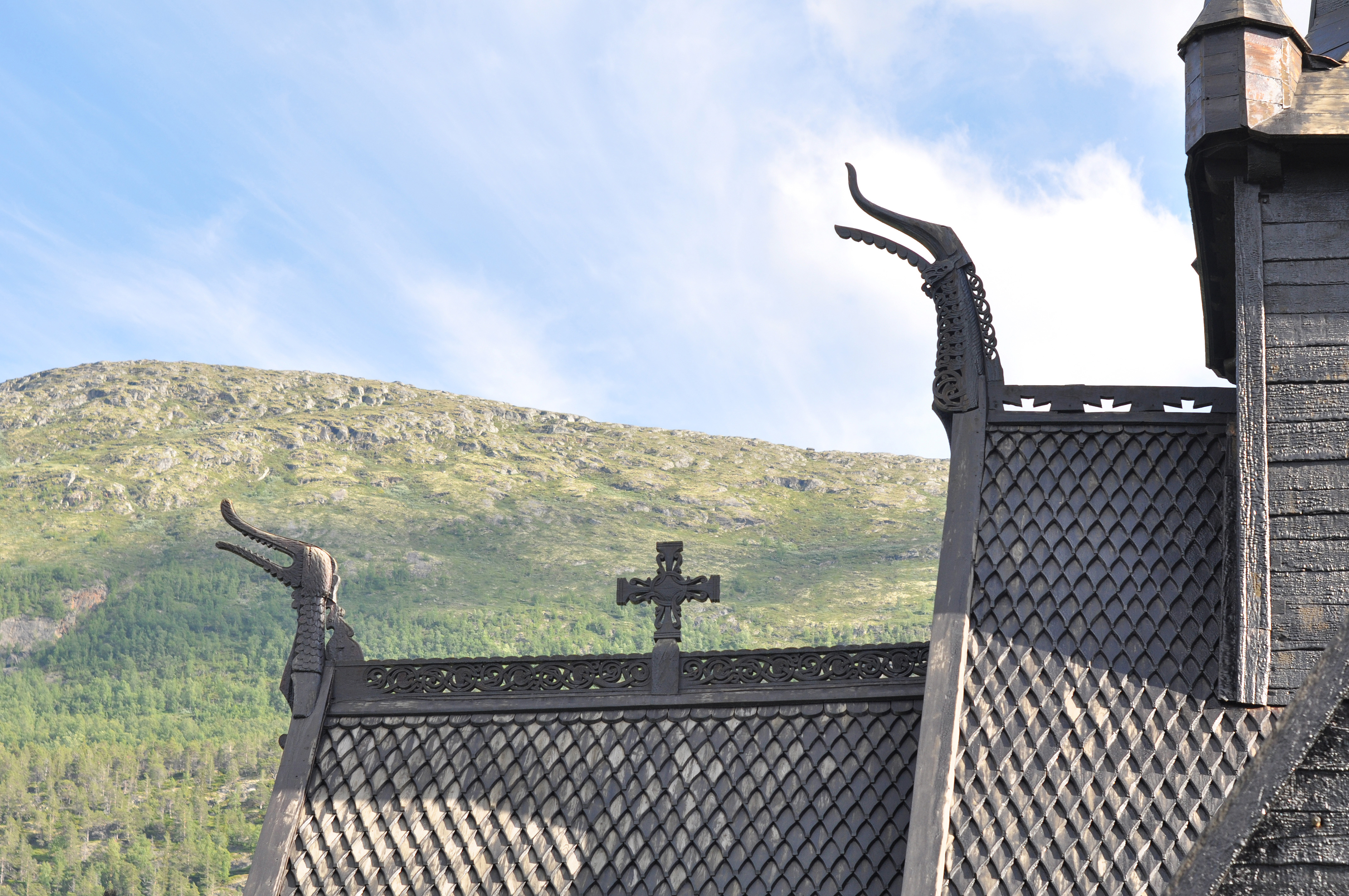
Dragon heads on the roof

Detail of the roof. Note the stairway.

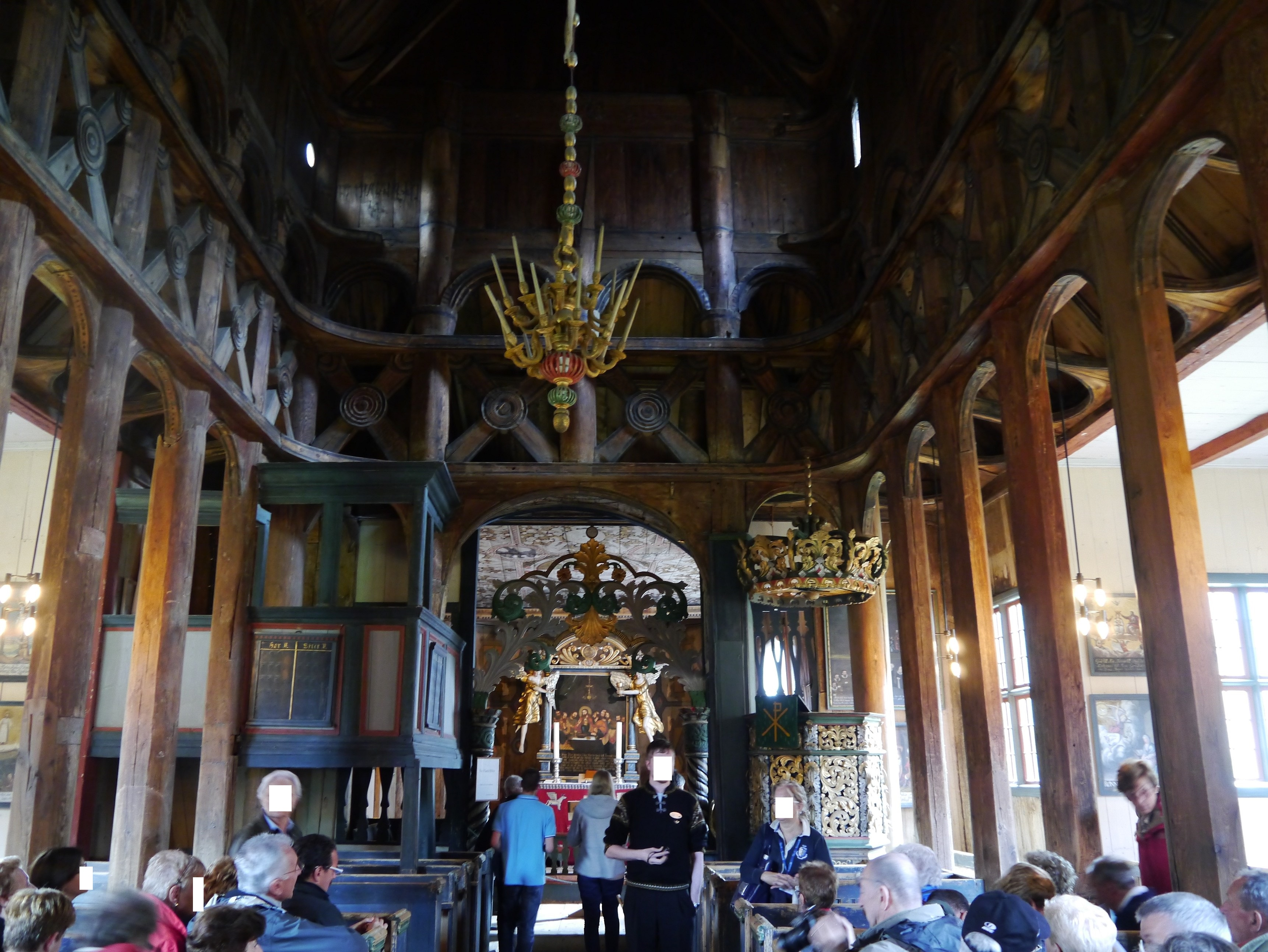
Interior of the church

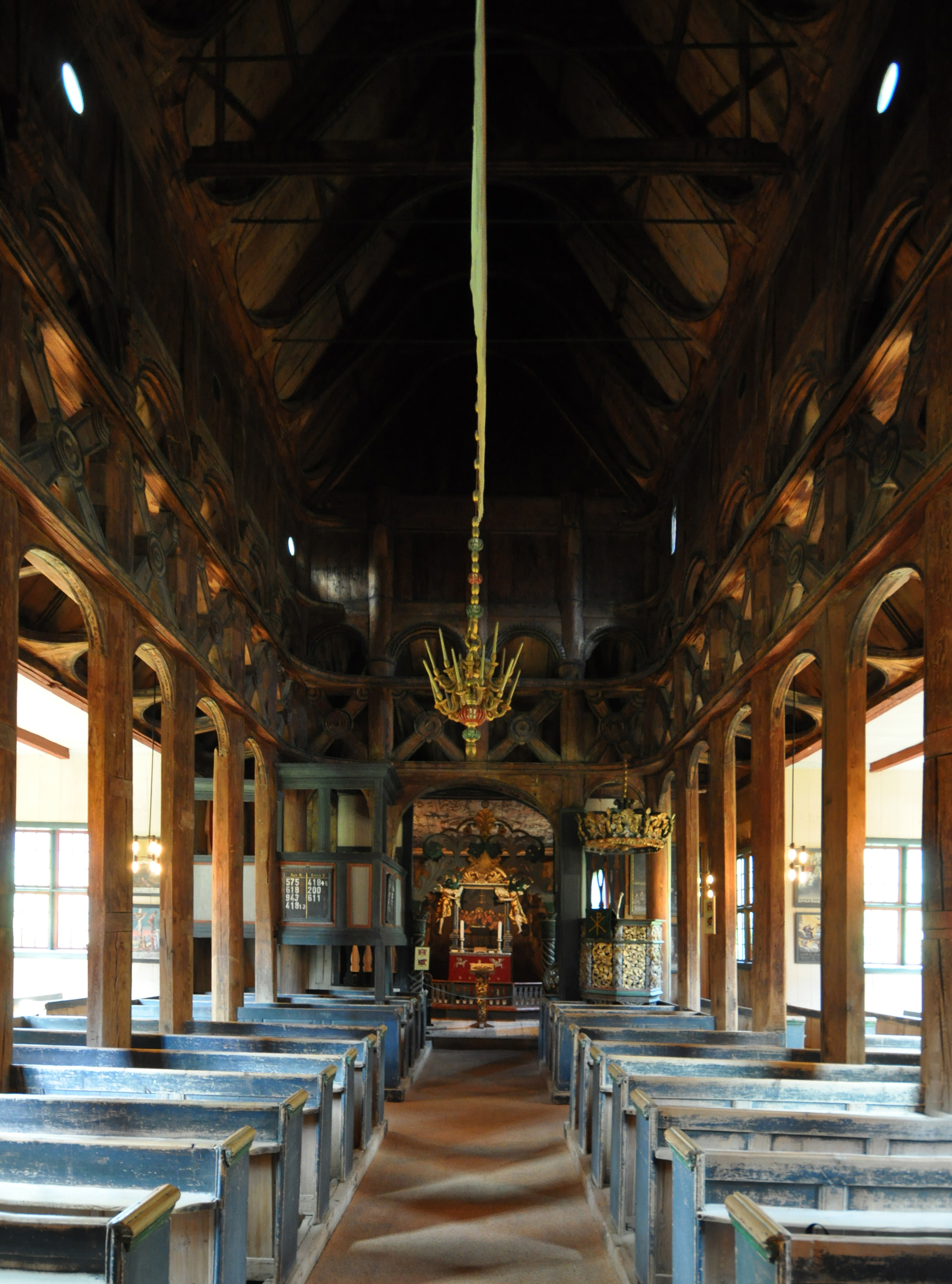
Nave

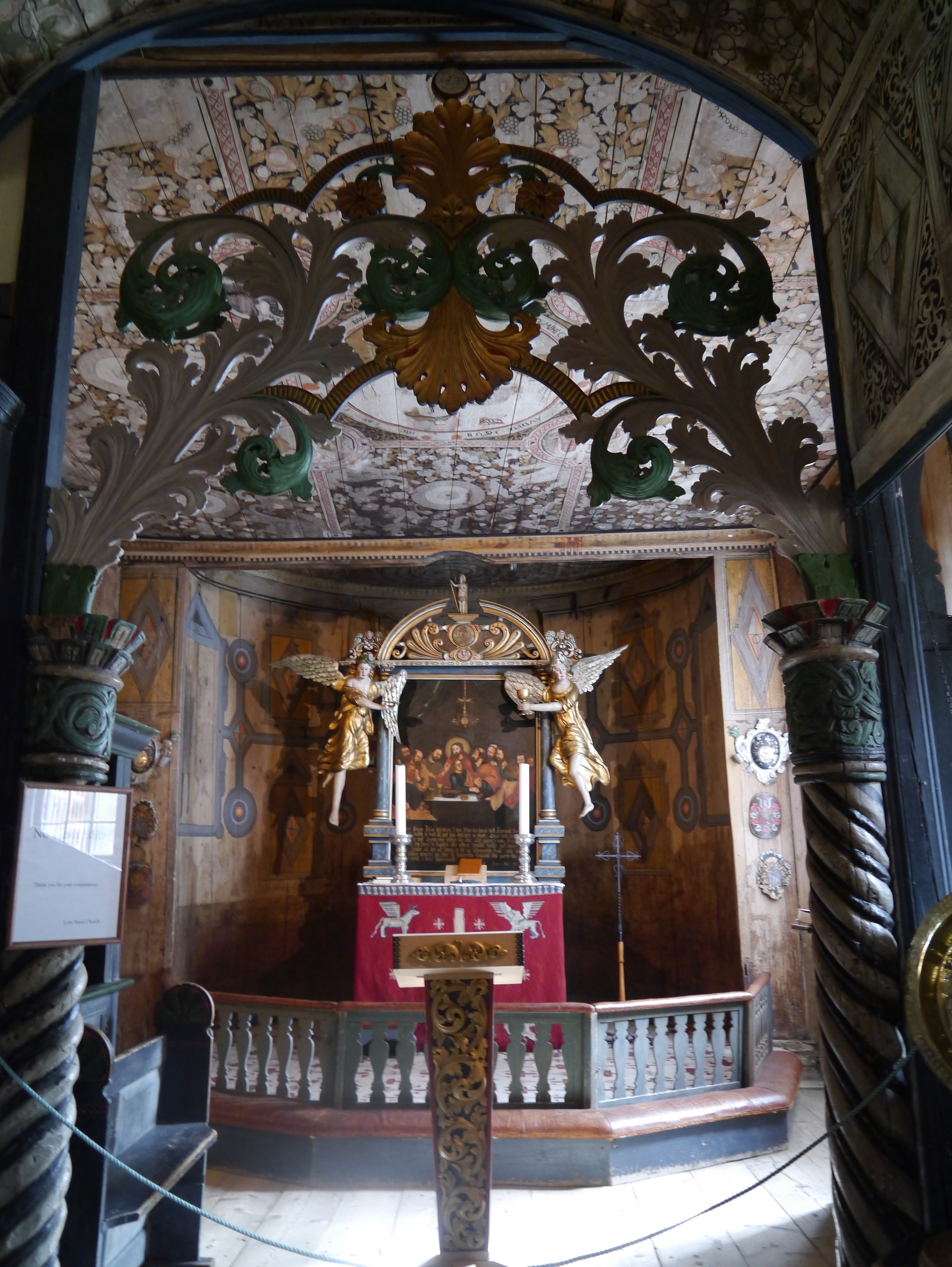
Choir

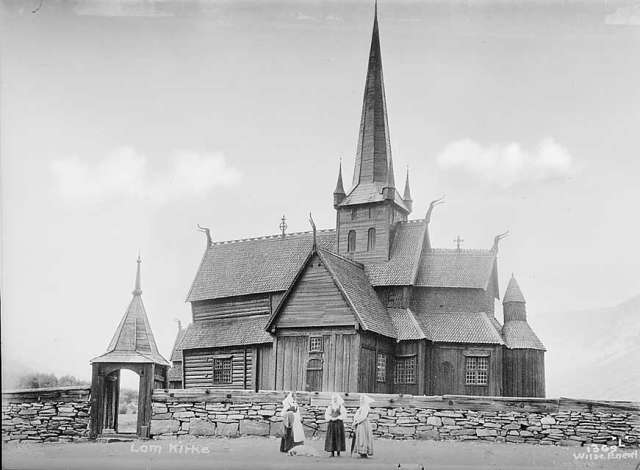
Photo by Axel Lindahl, 1880-1890

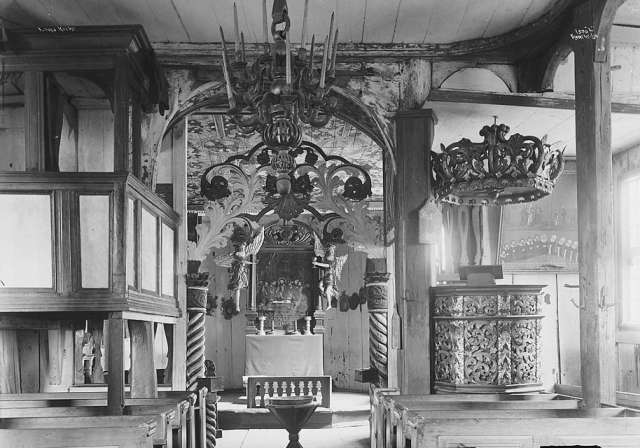
Church interior, photo by Axel Lindahl, 1880-1890

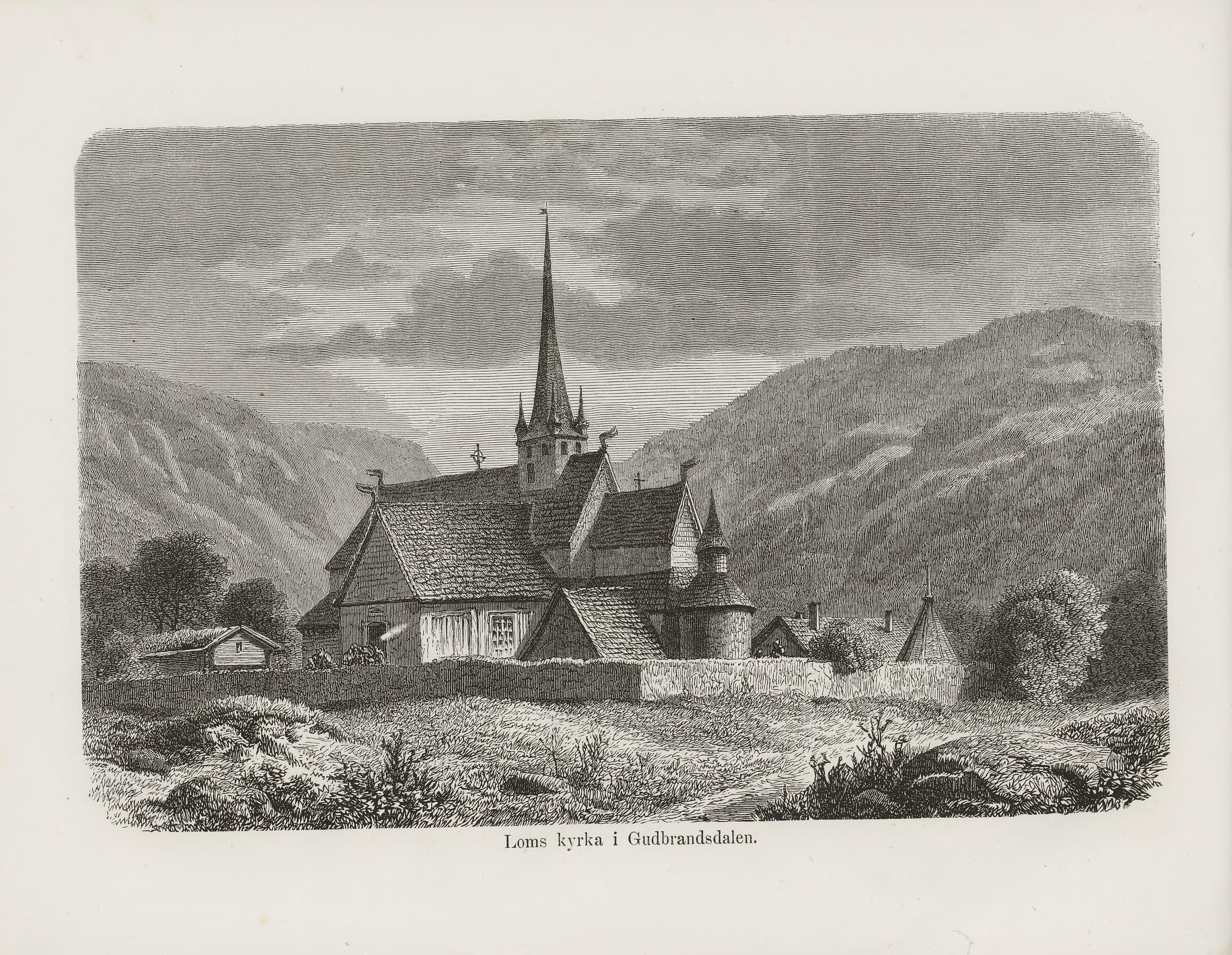
Illustration from Nordiska taflor, 1865

== Related reading ==
- Anker, Leif (2005). The Norwegian Stave Churches. Oslo: Arfo Forlag. ISBN 978-8291399294.
