= John Kringen =

John Kringen was named Deputy Director for Intelligence, Central Intelligence Agency (CIA), effective February 2005. In 2008, he joined the United States European Command at the Stuttgart-Vaihingen base.

Prior to becoming DDI, he was the Director of the DCI's Crime and Narcotics Center (CNC). He began his career with the CIA in 1978 as an analyst in the Directorate of Intelligence. During his career he has had responsibilities for managing intelligence programs in a wide variety of areas—ranging from tracking the international arms trade to monitoring political, economic, and military developments in much of the developing world. From March 1998-July 2000 he served as Director of the Office of Imagery Analysis with the National Imagery and Mapping Agency (now the National Geospatial-Intelligence Agency). He has also served overseas.

Prior to government service, he taught at the University of Maryland and received his Ph.D. in political science from the University of Minnesota.
