= Vågå Church =

Church in Innlandet, Norway

- Vågåkyrkja
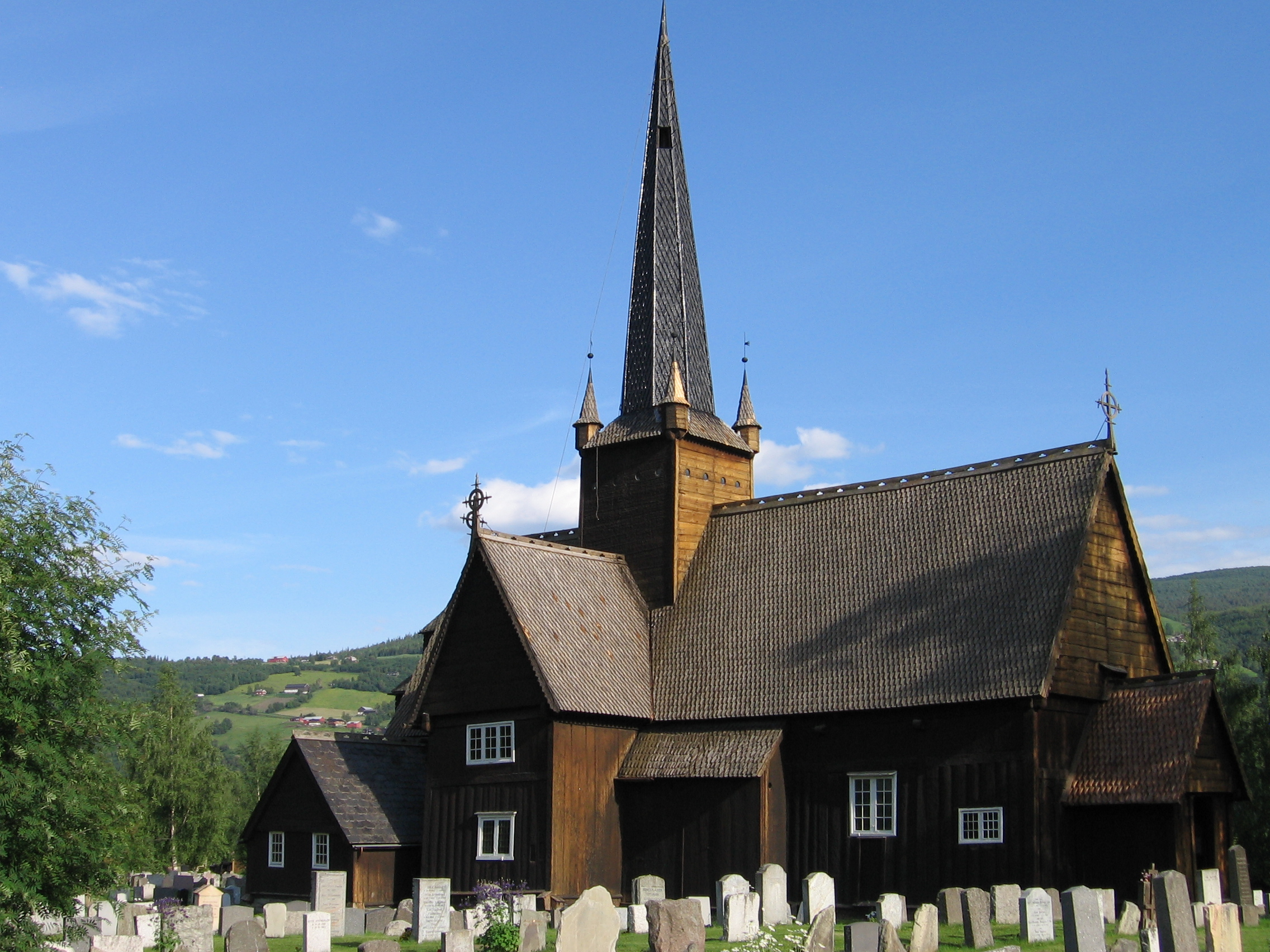
- View of the church
- Vågå Church
- 61°52′33″N 9°05′52″E
- Location: Vågå Municipality, Innlandet
- Country: Norway
- Denomination: Church of Norway
- Previous denomination: Catholic Church
- Churchmanship: Evangelical Lutheran

History
- Status: Parish church
- Founded: 12th century
- Consecrated: 1627

Architecture
- Functional status: Active
- Architect: Werner Olsen
- Architectural type: Cruciform
- Completed: 1627 (399 years ago)

Specifications
- Capacity: 250
- Materials: Wood

Administration
- Diocese: Hamar bispedømme
- Deanery: Nord-Gudbrandsdal prosti
- Parish: Vågå
- Norwegian Cultural Heritage Site
- Type: Church
- Status: Automatically protected
- ID: 85882

Vågå Church (Norwegian: Vågåkyrkja) is a historic stave church. It is a parish church of the Church of Norway in Vågå Municipality in Innlandet county, Norway. It is located in the village of Vågåmo. It is the church for the Vågå parish which is part of the Nord-Gudbrandsdal prosti (deanery) in the Diocese of Hamar. The brown, wooden church was built in a cruciform design in 1627 by the architect Werner Olsen. The church seats about 250 people.

== History ==
The first church in Vågåmo was a wooden stave church that was built during the middle of the 12th century, possibly around the year 1150. The building had a rectangular nave and a narrower, rectangular chancel. It was originally dedicated to St. Peter. The prior rectory was formerly called Ullinsyn. The older name of the site may show that even in pagan times, the location had been in use for worship.

In 1625–1627, the old church was completely rebuilt as a wooden cruciform church. The salvageable materials from the old church were reused in the construction of the new church on the same site. Only the carved portals and decorative wall planks survived from the original stave church. The basic architectural plan is a Latin cross. Above the crossing is a turret with a high tower helmet and four small side towers, a legacy from the Gothic tower architecture. The conversion was under the direction of Werner Olsen (ca. 1600–1682), who was also known as Werner Olsen Skurdal after the last of his residence. He was noted as a church and tower builder. He later worked on remodels to Lom Stave Church and Ringebu Stave Church.

In 1814, this church served as an election church (Norwegian: valgkirke). Together with more than 300 other parish churches across Norway, it was a polling station for elections to the 1814 Norwegian Constituent Assembly which wrote the Constitution of Norway. This was Norway's first national elections. Each church parish was a constituency that elected people called "electors" who later met together in each county to elect the representatives for the assembly that was to meet at Eidsvoll Manor later that year.

The crucifix at Vågå church is early Gothic work, dating from the mid-13th century. The pulpit dates from the completion of the church around 1630. The sacristy, constructed of shaped logs, was built during in the 1660s. The altarpiece is from 1674 and the altar rail dates from 1758.

Jo Gjende, who was born in Vågå, was buried in Vågå churchyard. On his grave is a small soapstone monument, which shows a wild reindeer herd in flight, after a painting by Gerhard Munthe.

== Media gallery ==
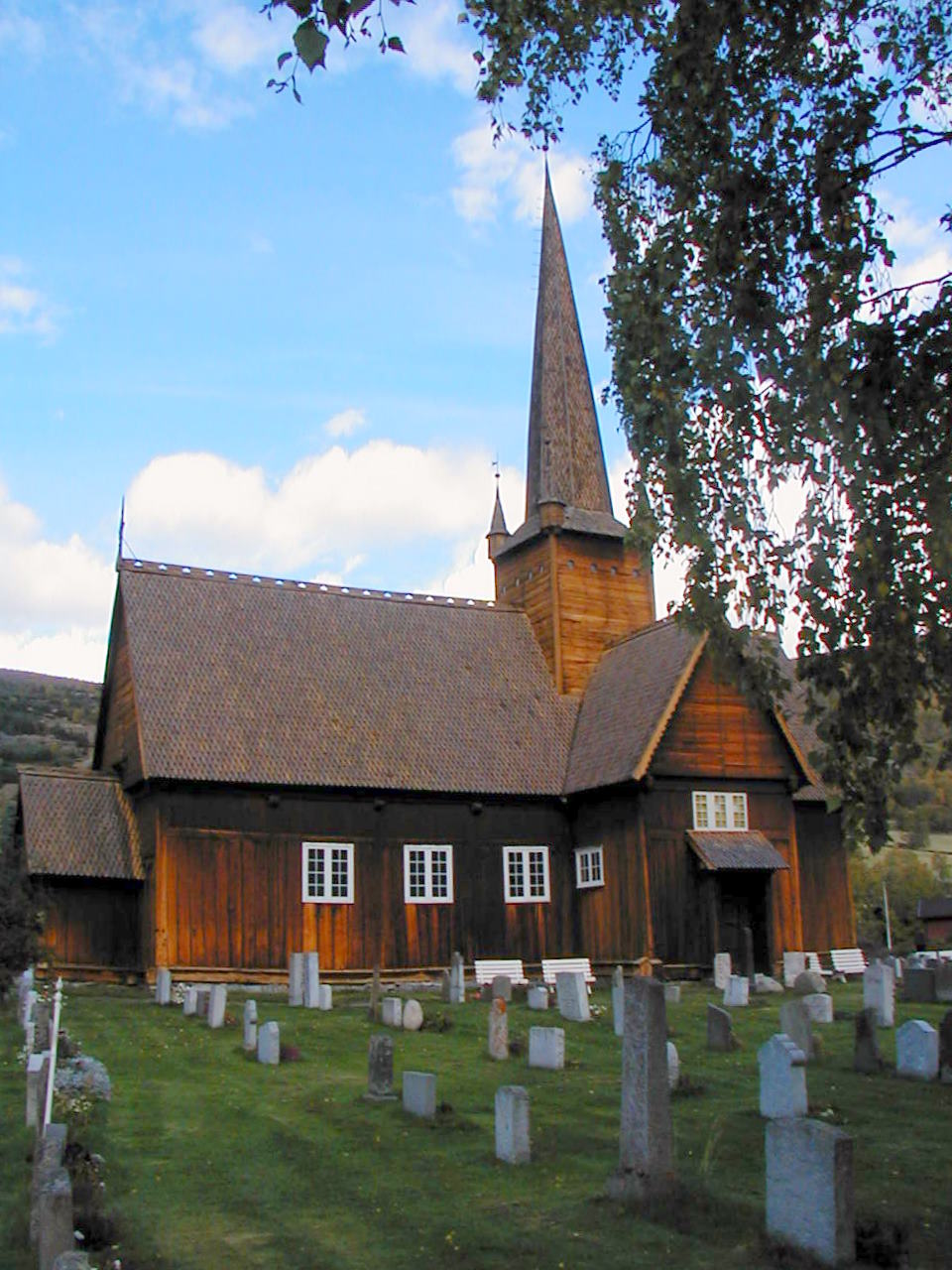
Vågå Stave Church

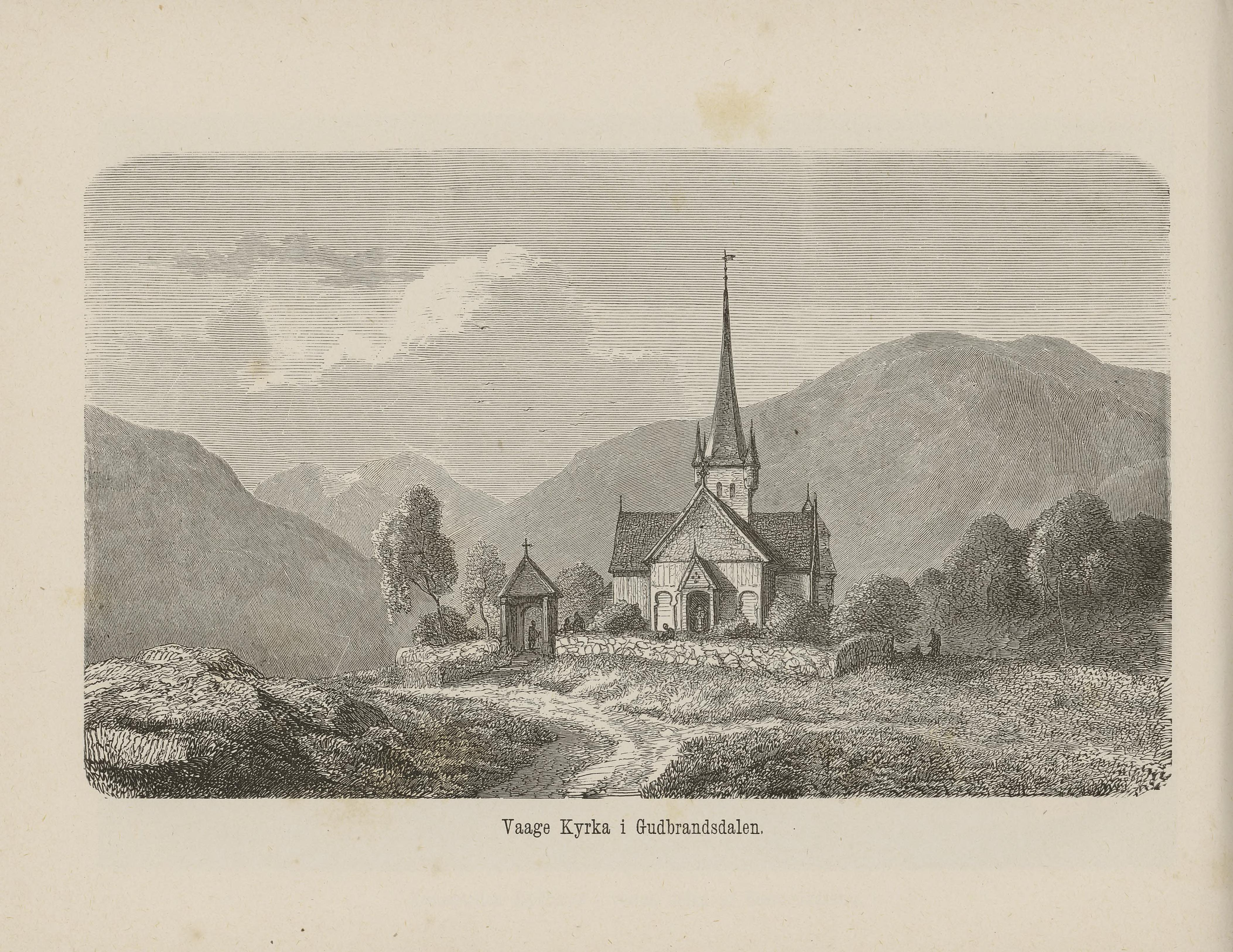
Illustration from 'Nordiska taflor', 1865

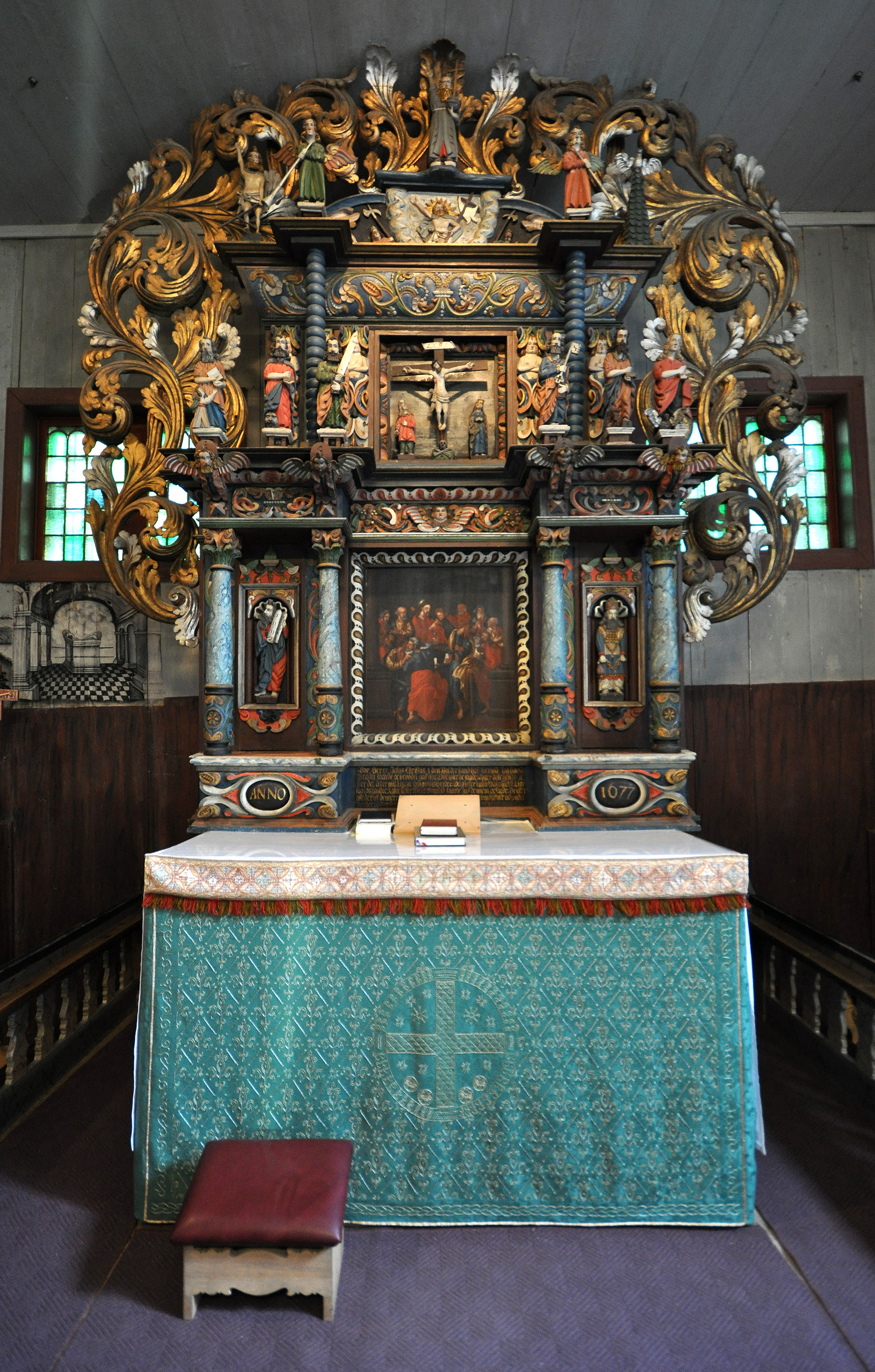
Vågå Church altar

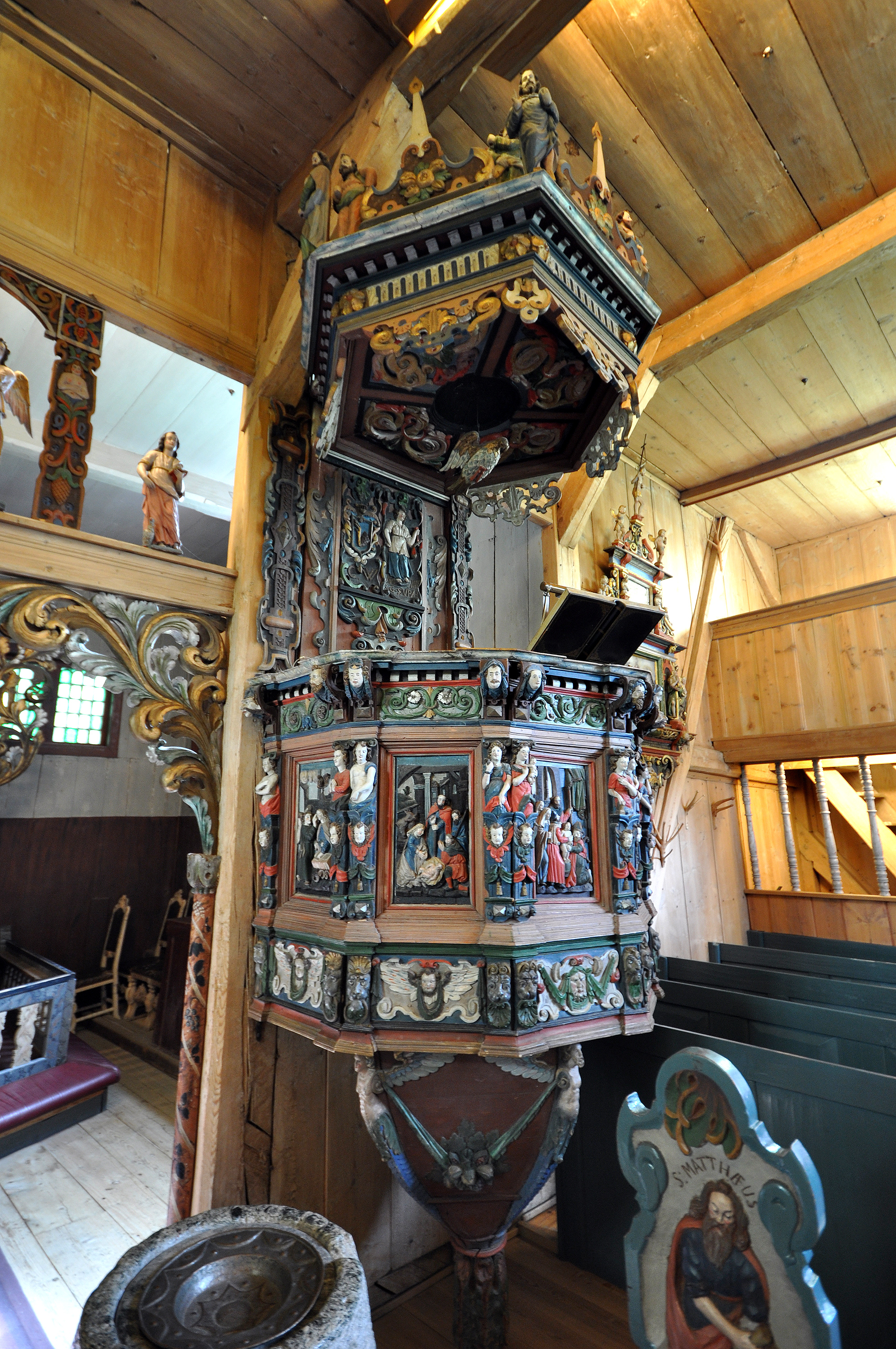
Vågå Church pulpit

== See also ==
- List of churches in Hamar

== Other sources ==
- Bugge, Gunnar (1983). Stavkirker, Stave Churches in Norway. Oslo: Dreyers Forlag. ISBN 82-504-2072-1.
- Dietrichson, Lorentz (1971). De Norske Stavkirker: Studier Over Deres System, Oprindelse Og Historiske Udvikling. Kristiania: Gregg Publishing. ISBN 0-576-19100-0.
- Rønningen, G. (1990). Kirketårn og takryttere fra 1621 til 1802 i Hamar. University of Oslo.
