= Oppland =

County of Norway (1781–2020)

Oppland County Oppland fylke
- Former County
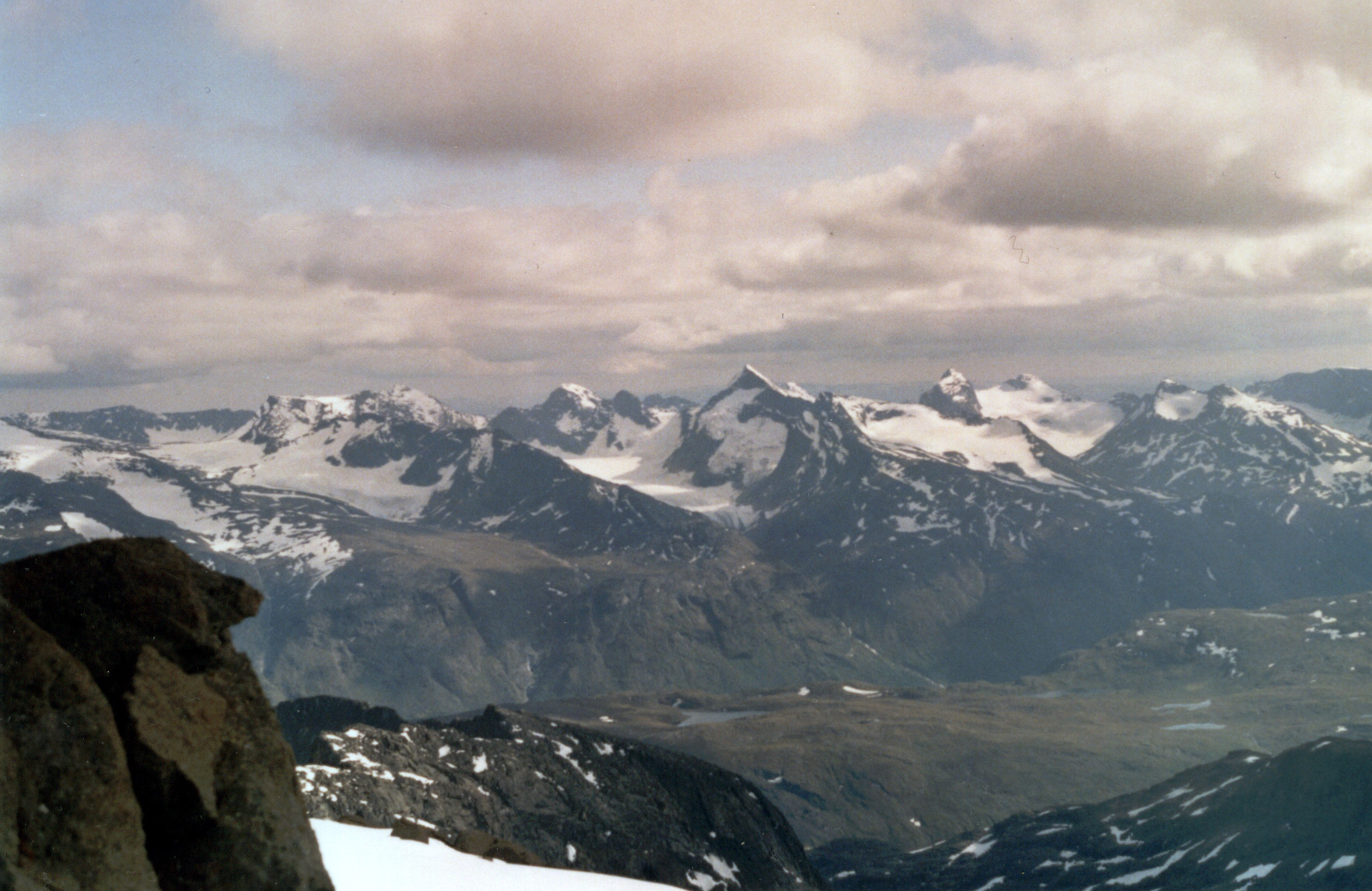
- Oppland mountains

- Flag Coat of arms

- Location within Oppland Location within Norway
- Coordinates: 61.41°N 9.34°E
- Country: Norway
- County: Oppland
- District: Eastern Norway
- Established: 1781
  - Preceded by: Oplandenes amt
- Disestablished: 1 Jan 2020
  - Succeeded by: Innlandet county
- Administrative centre: Lillehammer

Government
  - Body: Oppland County Municipality
  - Governor (2015-2019): Christl Kvam
  - County mayor (2015-2019): Even Aleksander Hagen

Area (upon dissolution)
  - Total: 25,192 km^{2} (9,727 sq mi)
  - Land: 23,787 km^{2} (9,184 sq mi)
  - Water: 1,405 km^{2} (542 sq mi) 5.6%

Population (30 September 2019)
  - Total: 189,437
  - Density: 7.9639/km^{2} (20.626/sq mi)
  - Change (10 years): ▲ +0.2%
- Demonym: Opplending

Official language
  - Norwegian form: Neutral
- Time zone: UTC+01:00 (CET)
  - Summer (DST): UTC+02:00 (CEST)
- ISO 3166 code: NO-05
- Income (per capita): 133,600 kr (2001)
- GDP (per capita): 193,130 kr (2001)
- GDP national rank: #13 in Norway (2.32% of country)
Historical population
| Year | Pop. | ±% |
|---|---|---|
| 1951 | 160,496 | — |
| 1961 | 166,303 | +3.6% |
| 1971 | 172,479 | +3.7% |
| 1981 | 180,765 | +4.8% |
| 1991 | 182,593 | +1.0% |
| 2001 | 183,419 | +0.5% |
| 2011 | 186,087 | +1.5% |
Source: Statistics Norway.
Religion in Oppland
| religion | percent |
| Christianity | 89.60% |
| Islam | 0.72% |
| Buddhism | 0.14% |
| Other | 9.54% |

Oppland [ˈɔ̂plɑn] is a former county in Norway which existed from 1781 until its dissolution on 1 January 2020. The old Oppland county bordered the counties of Trøndelag, Møre og Romsdal, Sogn og Fjordane, Buskerud, Akershus, Oslo and Hedmark. The county administration was located in the town of Lillehammer.

== Merger ==
On 1 January 2020, the neighboring counties of Oppland and Hedmark were merged to form the new Innlandet county. Both Oppland and Hedmark were the only landlocked counties of Norway, and the new Innlandet county is the only landlocked county in Norway. The two counties had historically been one county that was divided in 1781. Historically, the region was commonly known as "Opplandene". In 1781, the government split the area into two: Hedemarkens amt and Kristians amt (later renamed Hedmark and Oppland). In 2017, the government approved the merger of the two counties. There were several names debated, but the government settled on Innlandet.

== Geography ==
Oppland county extended from the lakes Mjøsa and Randsfjorden to the mountains Dovrefjell, Jotunheimen, and Rondane. Gråhøe is a mountain on the border between Sel Municipality and Dovre Municipality in Oppland.

The county was conventionally divided into traditional districts. These are the Gudbrandsdalen, Valdres, Toten, Hadeland and Land. Oppland included the towns Lillehammer, Gjøvik, Otta, and Fagernes, and Norway's two highest mountains (Glittertind and Galdhøpiggen) and the Valdres and Gudbrandsdalen valleys being popular attractions. The Gudbrandsdalen valley surrounds the river Gudbrandsdalslågen, and includes the area extending from Jotunheimen down to Bagn at Begna River. It is a well known place for skiing and winter sports. The main population centres in this area were Beitostølen and Fagernes. Eight of the ten highest mountains in Norway are located in the western part of Oppland.

== Etymology ==
In Norse times the inner parts of Norway were called Upplǫnd which means 'the upper countries'. The first element is upp which means 'upper'. The last element is lǫnd which is the plural form of 'land'.

In 1757, the inner parts of the great Akershus amt were separated and given the name Oplandenes Amt. This was divided in 1781 into Christians Amt (named after the king Christian VII) and Hedemarkens Amt. The name/form was changed to Kristians Amt in 1877 after an official spelling reform that changed ch to k (see also Kristiania, Kristiansand and Kristiansund). In 1919, the name Kristians Amt was changed (back) to Opland fylke, and the spelling Oppland was approved in 1950.

== Coat of arms ==
The coat of arms was granted in 1989, and it showed two Pulsatilla vernalis.

== Municipalities ==
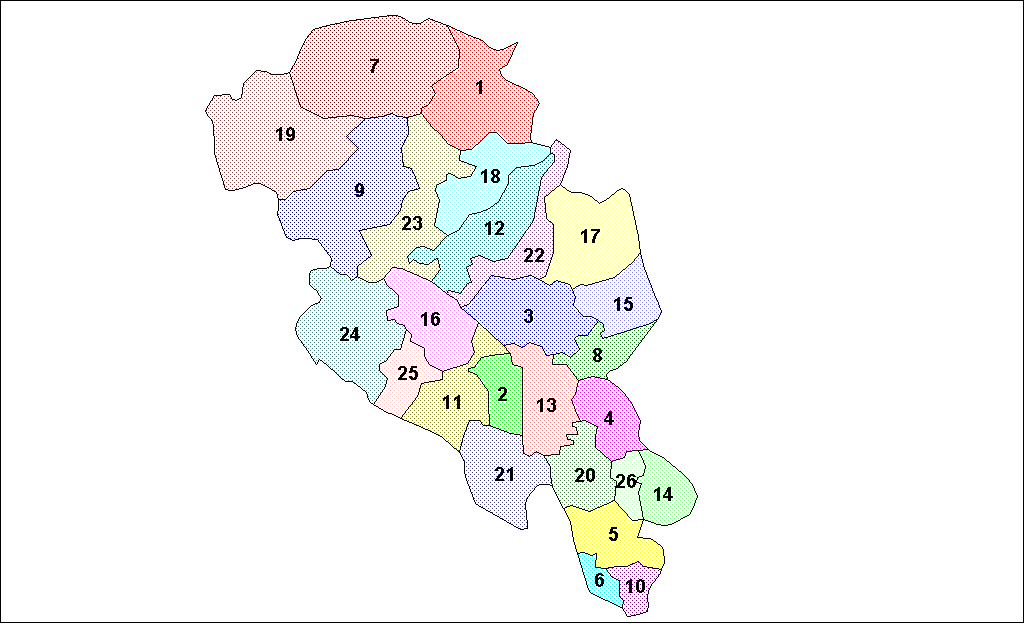

Oppland County (Christians Amt) had a total of 26 municipalities:

1. Dovre
2. Etnedal
3. Gausdal
4. Gjøvik
5. Gran
6. Jevnaker (Jævnaker)
7. Lesja (Lesje)
8. Lillehammer
9. Lom
10. Lunner
11. Nord-Aurdal
12. Nord-Fron
13. Nordre Land
14. Østre Toten
15. Øyer (Øier)
16. Øystre Slidre
17. Ringebu
18. Sel
19. Skjåk (Skjaak)
20. Søndre Land
21. Sør-Aurdal (Søndre Aurdal)
22. Sør-Fron
23. Vågå (Vaage)
24. Vang
25. Vestre Slidre
26. Vestre Toten

Number of minorities (1st and 2nd gen.) in Oppland by country of origin in 2017
| Nationality | Population (2017) |
|---|---|
| Poland | 2,421 |
| Lithuania | 1,606 |
| Somalia | 1,209 |
| Eritrea | 1,164 |
| Syria | 817 |
| Denmark | 743 |
| Iraq | 714 |
| Sweden | 698 |
| Germany | 660 |
| Bosnia-Herzegovina | 624 |
| Thailand | 574 |
| Afghanistan | 560 |
| Netherlands | 495 |
| Iran | 495 |
| Russia | 466 |
| Philippines | 376 |
| Vietnam | 365 |
| Kosovo | 330 |

== Districts ==
- Begnadalen
- Espedalen
- Gudbrandsdalen
- Hadeland
- Heidal
- Hunndalen
- Land
- Toten
- Valdres
- Vestoppland

== Cities ==
- Gjøvik
- Lillehammer
- Fagernes
- Otta
- Vinstra

== Parishes ==
- Aulstad
- Aurdal
- Austsinni
- Bagn
- Balke
- Begndal
- Biri
- Brandbu (Nes)
- Bruflat
- Bøverdal
- Dovre
- Eina
- Etnedal
- Fluberg
- Follebu (Folleboe)
- Fåberg
- Fåvang (Fodevang)
- Garmo
- Gausdal
- Gjøvik
- Gran
- Hedal
- Hegge
- Heidal
- Hoff
- Hunn
- Hurum
- Høre
- Jevnaker
- Kolbu
- Kvam
- Kvikne (Quiekne)
- Land
- Lesja (Læssø)
- Lesjaskog
- Lillehammer
- Lom
- Lomen (Røn, Røen)
- Lunner
- Mesna
- Nes (Brandbu)
- Nord-Aurdal
- Nord-Fron
- Nordberg
- Nordre Etnedal
- Nordre Land
- Nordsinni (Hogner)
- Nykirke
- Reinli
- Ringebu
- Rogne
- Røn (Røen)
- Saksumdal
- Sel
- Sister
- Skiåker
- Skjåk
- Skrautvål
- Slidredomen
- Snertingdal
- St. Mary
- St. Thomas
- Strand
- Svatsum
- Svenes
- Sødorp (Søthorp)
- Søndre Land
- Sør-Aurdal
- Sør-Fron
- Tingelstad
- Torpa
- Tretten (Trøtten)
- Ulnes
- Vang
- Vardal
- Venabygd
- Vestre Gausdal
- Vestre Slidre
- Vestre Toten
- Volbu
- Vågå
- Østre Gausdal
- Østre Slidre
- Østre Toten
- Østsinni (Gårder)
- Øye (Øie)
- Øyer
- Åmot
- Ås

== Villages ==
- Aurdal
- Bagn
- Begna
- Beitostølen
- Bismo
- Biri
- Bjoneroa
- Bjorli
- Bjølstad
- Bjørgo
- Brandbu
- Brekkom
- Bruflat
- Bybrua
- Bøverbru
- Dale
- Dokka
- Dombås
- Dovre
- Egge
- Eina
- Fagernes
- Fluberg
- Follebu
- Forset
- Fåberg
- Fåvang
- Grotli
- Grua
- Harestua
- Harpefoss
- Hjerkinn
- Hov
- Høvringen
- Jaren
- Jevnaker
- Kapp
- Kolbu
- Kvam
- Lalm
- Leira
- Lena
- Lensbygda
- Lesjaskog
- Lesjaverk
- Lora
- Moane
- Nordlia
- Odnes
- Raufoss
- Reinsvoll
- Ringstad
- Røn
- Sandbumoen
- Segalstad bru
- Skogbygda
- Skrautvål
- Skreia
- Skåbu
- Sletta
- Slidre
- Snertingdal
- Svingvoll
- Tretten
- Tyinkrysset
- Vang i Valdres
- Vinstra
- Vågåmo

== Former municipalities ==
- Biri (Birid)
- Brandbu
- Eina
- Fluberg
- Fron
- Fåberg (Faaberg)
- Heidal
- Kolbu
- Land
- Slidre
- Snertingdal
- Torpa
- Vardal
- Vestre Gausdal
- Østre Gausdal

== See also ==
- Høgbrothøgdi
- Røykeskardhøi
- Oppland (Storting constituency)
- Oppland County Municipality
- Oppland Regiment
