= Nord-Sel Church =

Church in Innlandet, Norway

- Nord-Sel kyrkje
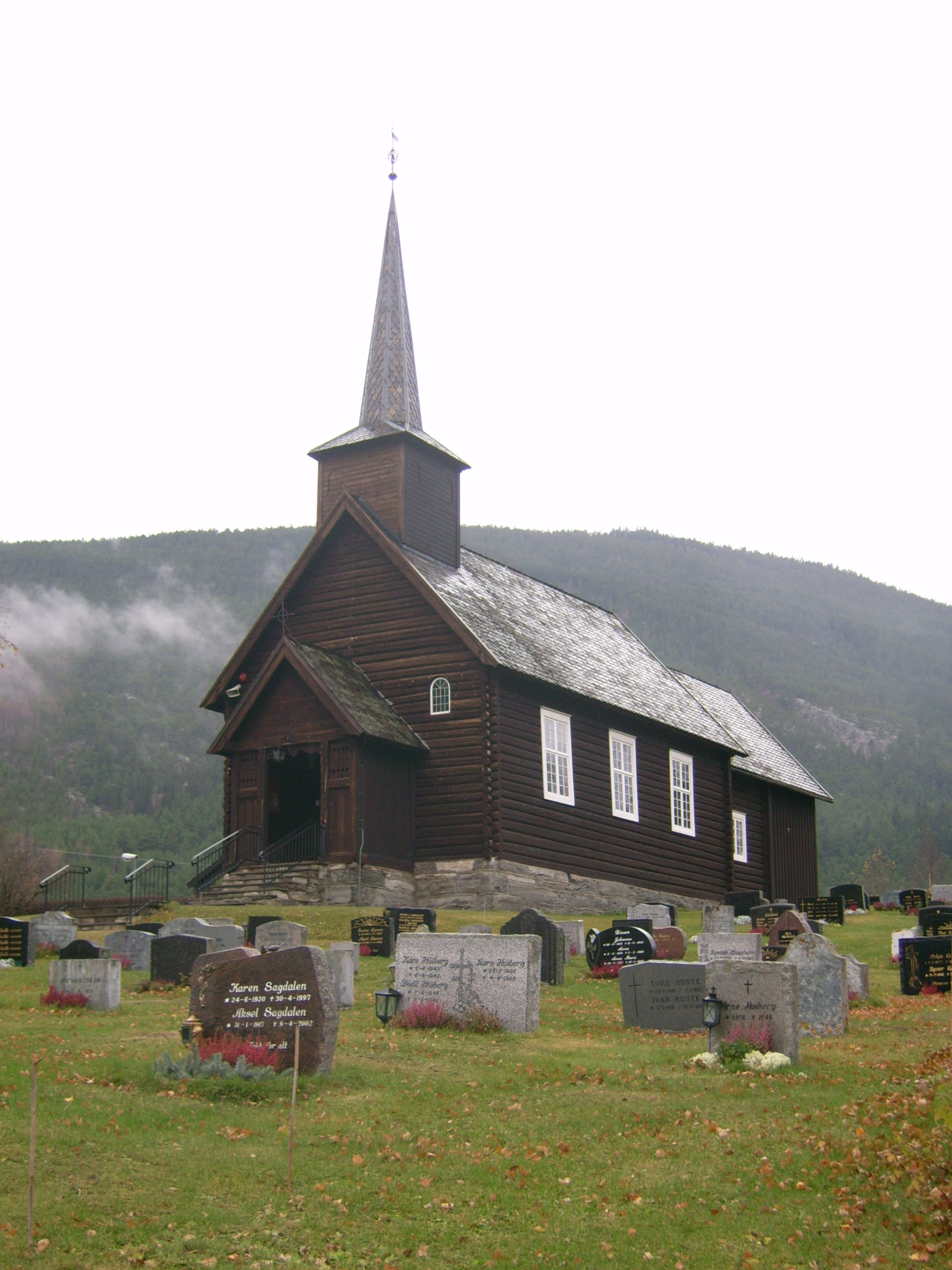
- View of the church
- Nord-Sel Church
- 61°50′58″N 9°25′15″E
- Location: Sel Municipality, Innlandet
- Country: Norway
- Denomination: Church of Norway
- Churchmanship: Evangelical Lutheran

History
- Status: Parish church
- Founded: 1932
- Consecrated: 1932

Architecture
- Functional status: Active
- Architect: Knut Villa
- Architectural type: Long church
- Completed: 1932 (94 years ago)

Specifications
- Capacity: 120
- Materials: Wood

Administration
- Diocese: Hamar bispedømme
- Deanery: Nord-Gudbrandsdal prosti
- Parish: Nord-Sel
- Norwegian Cultural Heritage Site
- Type: Church
- Status: Protected
- ID: 85164

Nord-Sel Church (Norwegian: Nord-Sel kyrkje) is a parish church of the Church of Norway in Sel Municipality in Innlandet county, Norway. It is located in the village of Nord-Sel. It is the church for the Nord-Sel parish which is part of the Nord-Gudbrandsdal prosti (deanery) in the Diocese of Hamar. The brown, wooden church was built in a long church design in 1932 using plans drawn up by the architect Knut Villa. The church seats about 120 people.

== History ==
Historically, the old Sel Church was located at Nord-Sel on the Romundgård farm, just about 80 metres (260 ft) south of the present site of the Nord-Sel Church. In 1742, the old Sel Church was torn down and a new Sel Church was built about 9 kilometres (5.6 mi) to the southeast, further down the valley. Nord-Sel was then without a church for nearly 200 years. In the early 1930s, plans were made to build a new church in Nord-Sel, on a site about 80 metres (260 ft) to the north of the old historic church site, on the opposite side of the road. The new long church building was designed by Knut Villa. The building was constructed in 1931-1932 and it was consecrated in 1932. The nave is rectangular and has a small tower over the church porch in the southeast, the chancel is on the northwest end of the building, and there is a sacristy on the southwest side of the chancel.

== Media gallery ==
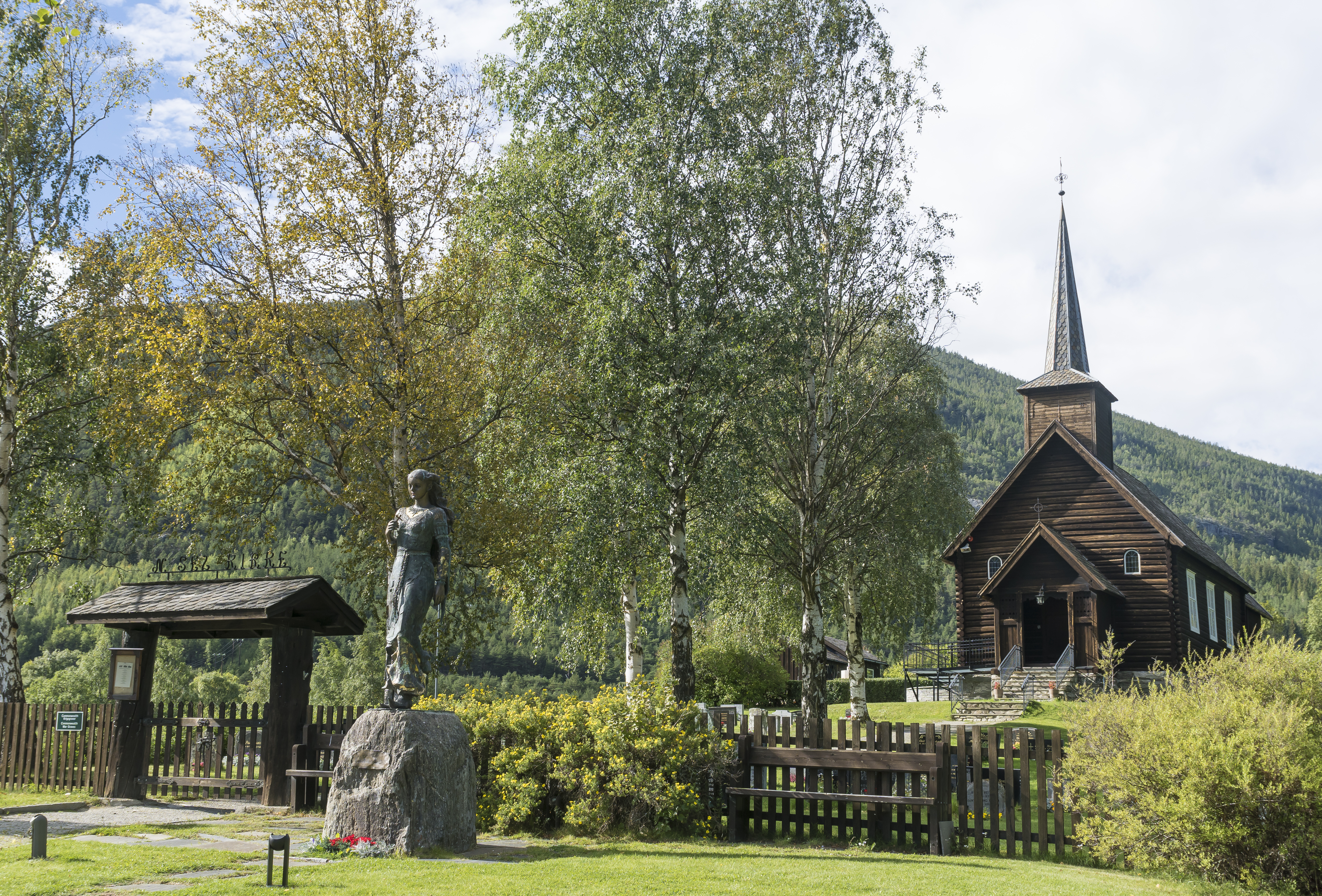

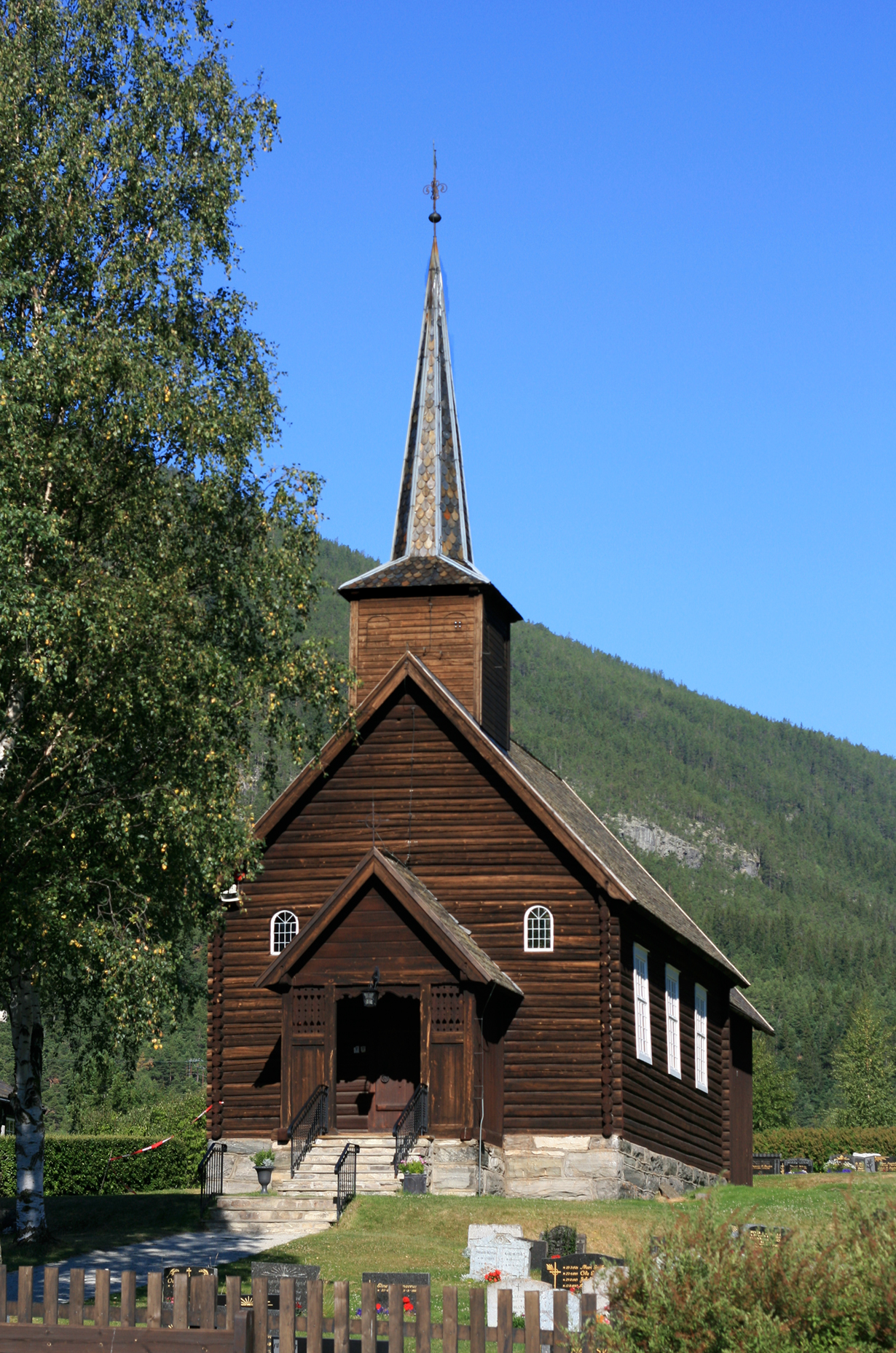

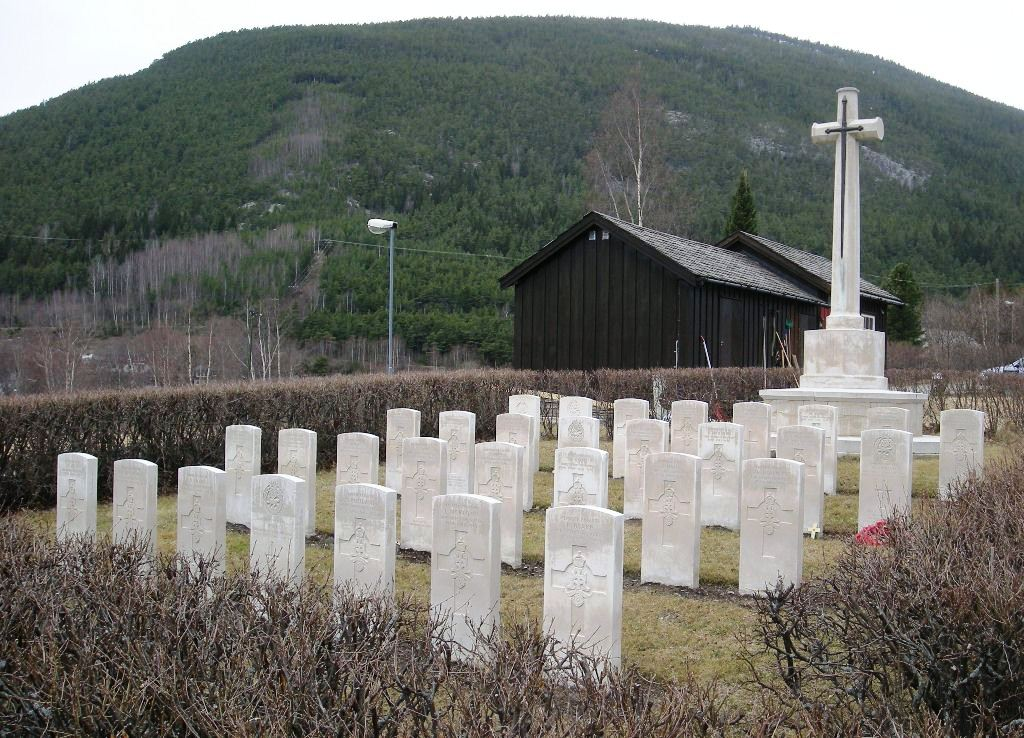

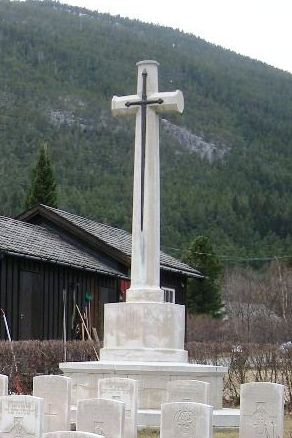

== See also ==
- List of churches in Hamar
