= Sel Municipality =

Municipality in Innlandet, Norway

Sel Municipality Sel kommune
- Municipality
- Sell herred (historic name)
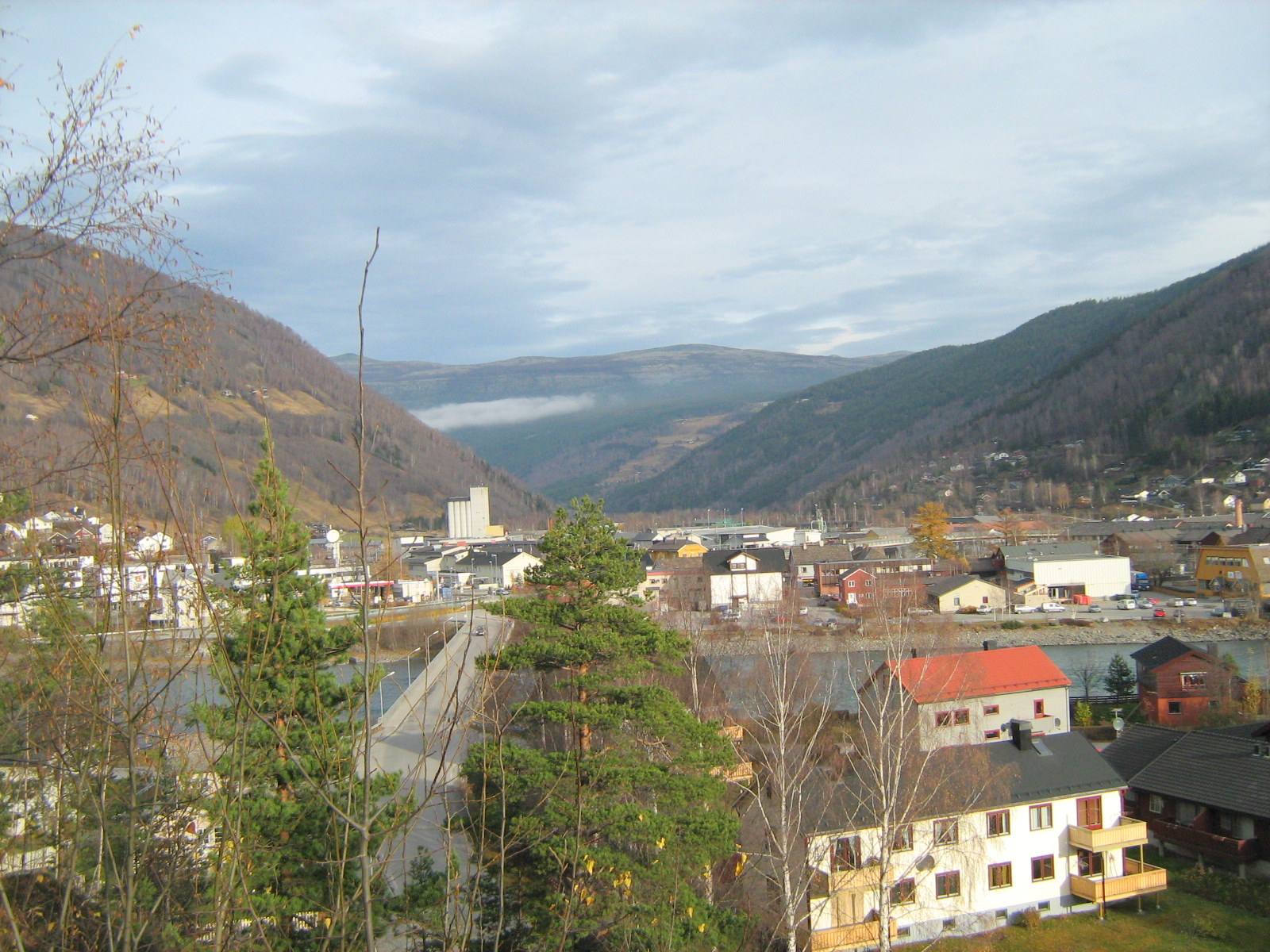
- View of the town of Otta

- Coat of arms

- Innlandet within Norway

- Sel within Innlandet
- Coordinates: 61°49′1″N 9°34′24″E
- Country: Norway
- County: Innlandet
- District: Gudbrandsdal
- Established: 1 Jan 1908
  - Preceded by: Vaage Municipality
- Administrative centre: Otta

Government
  - Mayor (2019): Eldri Siem (Sp)

Area
  - Total: 905.04 km^{2} (349.44 sq mi)
  - Land: 888.48 km^{2} (343.04 sq mi)
  - Water: 16.56 km^{2} (6.39 sq mi) 1.8%
  - Rank: #130 in Norway
- Highest elevation: 2,138.65 m (7,016.6 ft)

Population (2025)
  - Total: 5,623
  - Rank: #171 in Norway
  - Density: 6.2/km^{2} (16/sq mi)
  - Change (10 years): ▼ −3.6%
- Demonym: Selvær

Official language
  - Norwegian form: Neutral
- Time zone: UTC+01:00 (CET)
  - Summer (DST): UTC+02:00 (CEST)
- ISO 3166 code: NO-3437
- Website: Official website

Sel is a municipality in Innlandet county, Norway. It is located in the traditional district of Gudbrandsdal. The administrative centre of the municipality is the town of Otta. The municipality also includes several notable villages including Bjølstadmo, Dale, Høvringen, Nord-Sel, Sandbumoen, Sjoa, and Skogbygda.

The 905-square-kilometre (349 sq mi) municipality is the 130th largest by area out of the 357 municipalities in Norway. Sel Municipality is the 171st most populous municipality in Norway with a population of 5,623. The municipality's population density is 6.2 inhabitants per square kilometre (16/sq mi) and its population has decreased by 3.6% over the previous 10-year period.

== General information ==
The new municipality of Sel was established on 1 January 1908 when the large Vaage Municipality was divided into three separate municipalities:

- the northeastern part became the new Sel Municipality (population: 2,287)
- the southeastern part became the new Heidal Municipality (population: 1,241)
- the western part continued as Vaage Municipality (population: 2,953)

During the 1960s, there were many municipal mergers across Norway due to the work of the Schei Committee. On 1 January 1965, the following areas were merged to form a new, larger Sel Municipality:

- Heidal Municipality (population: 1,731)
- Sel Municipality (population: 3,687)
- the Tolstadåsen area of Vågå Municipality (population: 35)
- the Sjoa area of Nord-Fron Municipality (population: 413)

Historically, this municipality was part of the old Oppland county. On 1 January 2020, the municipality became a part of the newly-formed Innlandet county (after Hedmark and Oppland counties were merged).

=== Name ===
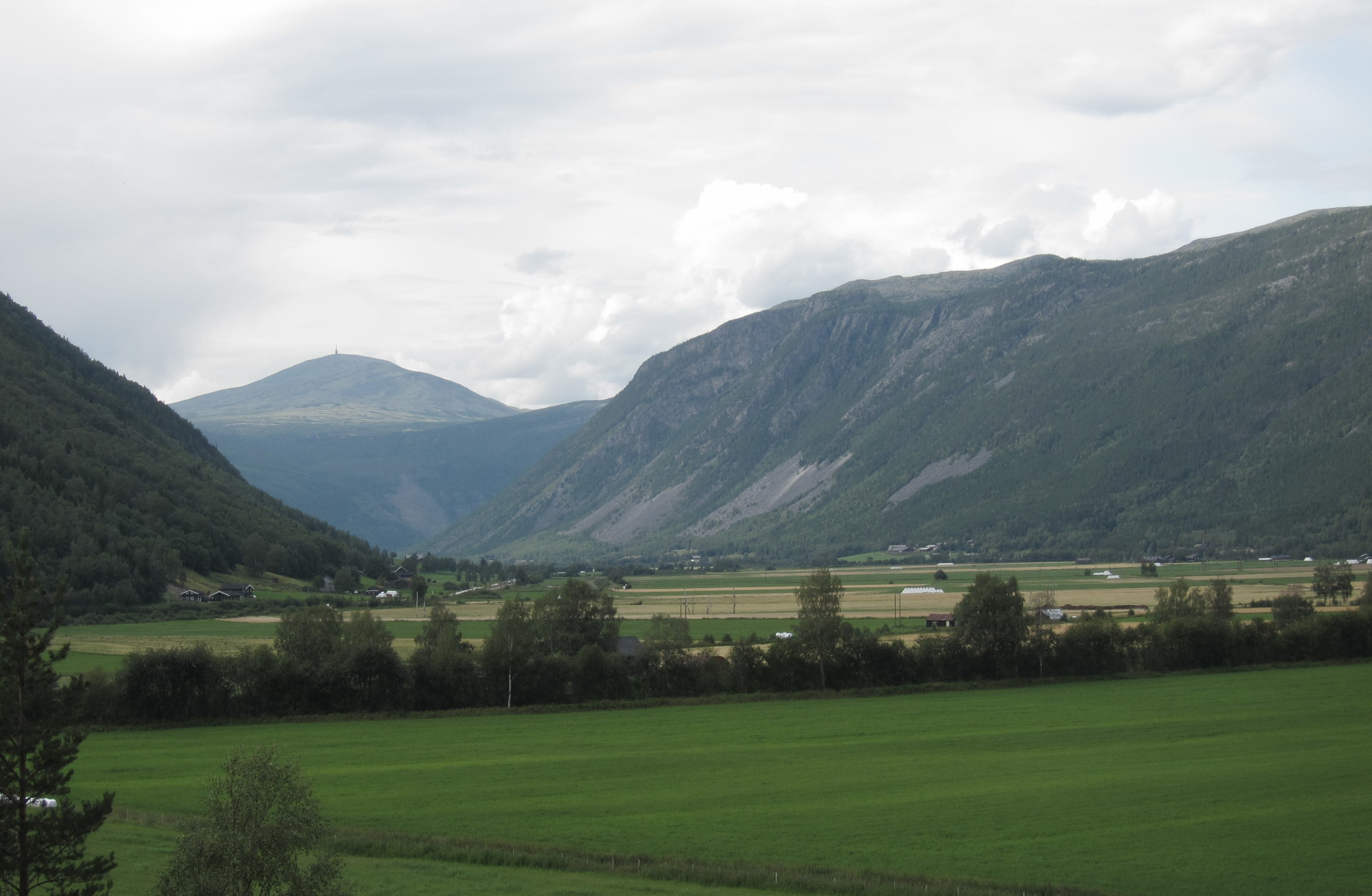
View of the Sel valley

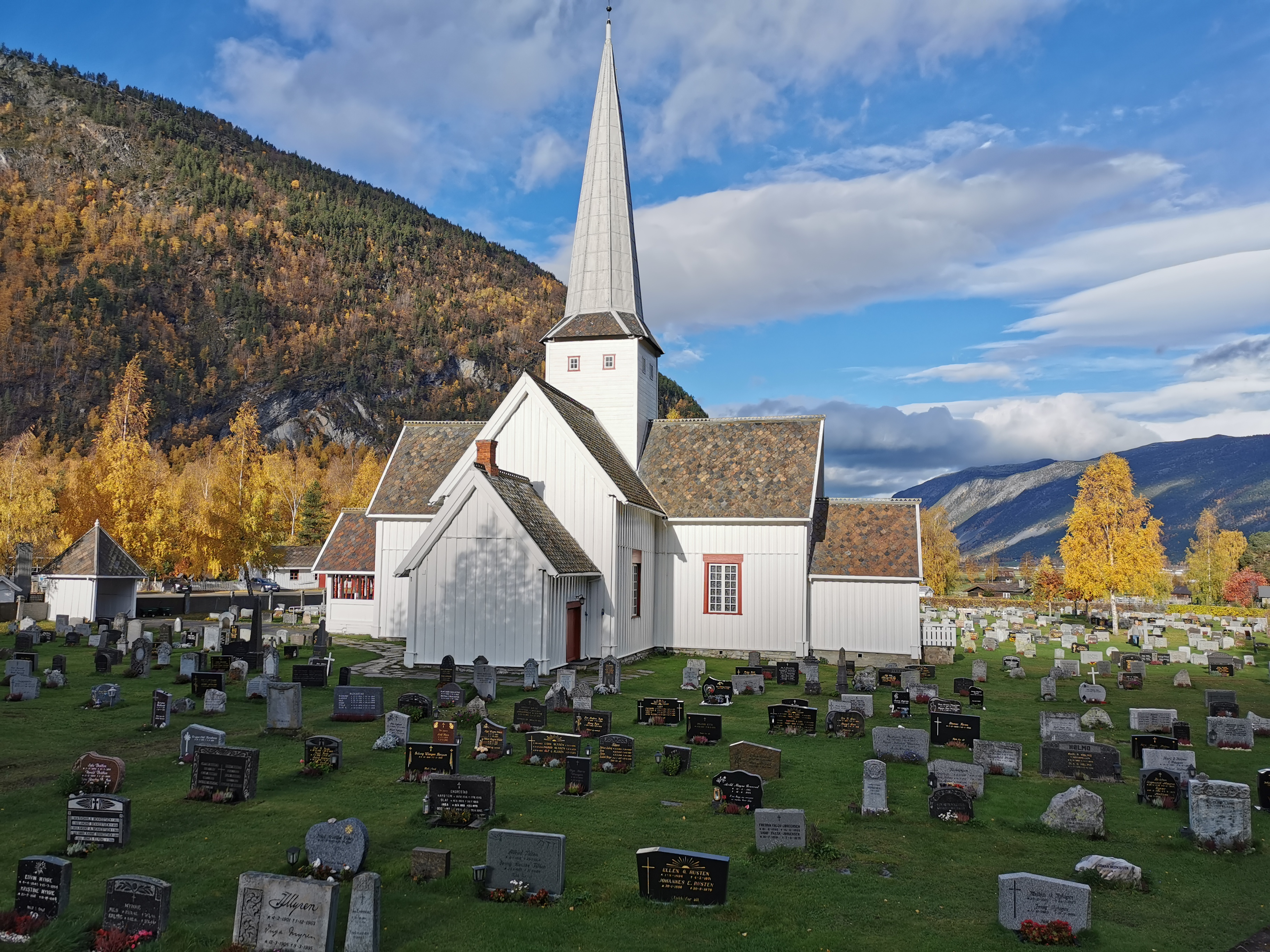
View of Sel Church

The municipality (originally the parish) is named after the old Sel farm (Old Norse: Sil) since the first Sel Church was built there. This farm is located in the present-day village of Nord-Sel. The name is identical with the word sil which means "slowly running and quiet part of a river" (here meaning the Gudbrandsdalslågen river).

=== Coat of arms ===
The coat of arms was approved on 18 May 1985, but it was never approved by a royal decree because it did not meet the strict rules for coats of arms at that time. The blazon is "Azure, a girl playing a trumpet Or". This means the arms have a blue field (background) and the charge is a girl playing a trumpet. The charge has a tincture of Or which means it is commonly colored yellow, but if it is made out of metal, then gold is used. The design is based on the local Prillar-Guri legend. In 1612, a Scottish army marched through the area on its way to Sweden. They were stopped by the local farmers at the Battle of Kringen. The legend tells that the farmers were warned for the Scots by a local girl with a trumpet. The arms were designed by Jarle Skuseth. The municipal flag has the same design as the coat of arms.

=== Churches ===
The Church of Norway has three parishes (sokn) within Sel Municipality. It is part of the Nord-Gudbrandsdal prosti (deanery) in the Diocese of Hamar.

Churches in Sel Municipality
Parish (sokn)	Church name	Location of the church	Year built
Heidal	Heidal Church	Bjølstadmo	1941
Nord-Sel	Nord-Sel Church	Nord-Sel	1932
Sel	Sel Church	Selsverket (just north of Otta)	1742
Sel	Sjoa Chapel	Sjoa	1978

== Government ==
Sel Municipality is responsible for primary education (through 10th grade), outpatient health services, senior citizen services, welfare and other social services, zoning, economic development, and municipal roads and utilities. The municipality is governed by a municipal council of directly elected representatives. The mayor is indirectly elected by a vote of the municipal council. The municipality is under the jurisdiction of the Gudbrandsdal District Court and the Eidsivating Court of Appeal.

=== Municipal council ===
The municipal council (Kommunestyre) of Sel Municipality is made up of 25 representatives that are elected to four year terms. The tables below show the current and historical composition of the council by political party.

Sel kommunestyre 2023–2027
Party name (in Norwegian)	Number of representatives
Labour Party (Arbeiderpartiet)	10
Centre Party (Senterpartiet)	13
Socialist Left Party (Sosialistisk Venstreparti)	2
Total number of members:	25

Sel kommunestyre 2019–2023
Party name (in Norwegian)	Number of representatives
Labour Party (Arbeiderpartiet)	7
Green Party (Miljøpartiet De Grønne)	1
Conservative Party (Høyre)	1
Centre Party (Senterpartiet)	15
Socialist Left Party (Sosialistisk Venstreparti)	1
Total number of members:	25

Sel kommunestyre 2015–2019
Party name (in Norwegian)	Number of representatives
Labour Party (Arbeiderpartiet)	15
Green Party (Miljøpartiet De Grønne)	1
Conservative Party (Høyre)	3
Centre Party (Senterpartiet)	5
Socialist Left Party (Sosialistisk Venstreparti)	1
Total number of members:	25

Sel kommunestyre 2011–2015
Party name (in Norwegian)	Number of representatives
Labour Party (Arbeiderpartiet)	15
Conservative Party (Høyre)	5
Christian Democratic Party (Kristelig Folkeparti)	1
Centre Party (Senterpartiet)	3
Socialist Left Party (Sosialistisk Venstreparti)	1
Total number of members:	25

Sel kommunestyre 2007–2011
Party name (in Norwegian)	Number of representatives
Labour Party (Arbeiderpartiet)	15
Progress Party (Fremskrittspartiet)	2
Conservative Party (Høyre)	2
Christian Democratic Party (Kristelig Folkeparti)	1
Centre Party (Senterpartiet)	3
Socialist Left Party (Sosialistisk Venstreparti)	2
Total number of members:	25

Sel kommunestyre 2003–2007
Party name (in Norwegian)	Number of representatives
Labour Party (Arbeiderpartiet)	12
Progress Party (Fremskrittspartiet)	2
Conservative Party (Høyre)	2
Christian Democratic Party (Kristelig Folkeparti)	1
Red Electoral Alliance (Rød Valgallianse)	1
Centre Party (Senterpartiet)	4
Socialist Left Party (Sosialistisk Venstreparti)	3
Total number of members:	25

Sel kommunestyre 1999–2003
Party name (in Norwegian)	Number of representatives
Labour Party (Arbeiderpartiet)	16
Conservative Party (Høyre)	4
Christian Democratic Party (Kristelig Folkeparti)	3
Red Electoral Alliance (Rød Valgallianse)	1
Centre Party (Senterpartiet)	4
Socialist Left Party (Sosialistisk Venstreparti)	3
Total number of members:	31

Sel kommunestyre 1995–1999
Party name (in Norwegian)	Number of representatives
Labour Party (Arbeiderpartiet)	18
Conservative Party (Høyre)	2
Christian Democratic Party (Kristelig Folkeparti)	1
Centre Party (Senterpartiet)	7
Socialist Left Party (Sosialistisk Venstreparti)	2
Local list (Bygdalista)	1
Total number of members:	31

Sel kommunestyre 1991–1995
Party name (in Norwegian)	Number of representatives
Labour Party (Arbeiderpartiet)	16
Progress Party (Fremskrittspartiet)	1
Conservative Party (Høyre)	3
Centre Party (Senterpartiet)	7
Socialist Left Party (Sosialistisk Venstreparti)	4
Total number of members:	31

Sel kommunestyre 1987–1991
Party name (in Norwegian)	Number of representatives
Labour Party (Arbeiderpartiet)	19
Conservative Party (Høyre)	3
Christian Democratic Party (Kristelig Folkeparti)	1
Centre Party (Senterpartiet)	5
Socialist Left Party (Sosialistisk Venstreparti)	3
Total number of members:	31

Sel kommunestyre 1983–1987
Party name (in Norwegian)	Number of representatives
Labour Party (Arbeiderpartiet)	20
Conservative Party (Høyre)	4
Christian Democratic Party (Kristelig Folkeparti)	1
Centre Party (Senterpartiet)	5
Socialist Left Party (Sosialistisk Venstreparti)	1
Total number of members:	31

Sel kommunestyre 1979–1983
Party name (in Norwegian)	Number of representatives
Labour Party (Arbeiderpartiet)	19
Conservative Party (Høyre)	4
Christian Democratic Party (Kristelig Folkeparti)	1
Centre Party (Senterpartiet)	5
Socialist Left Party (Sosialistisk Venstreparti)	2
Total number of members:	31

Sel kommunestyre 1975–1979
Party name (in Norwegian)	Number of representatives
Labour Party (Arbeiderpartiet)	21
Conservative Party (Høyre)	2
Christian Democratic Party (Kristelig Folkeparti)	1
Centre Party (Senterpartiet)	6
Socialist Left Party (Sosialistisk Venstreparti)	1
Total number of members:	31

Sel kommunestyre 1971–1975
Party name (in Norwegian)	Number of representatives
Labour Party (Arbeiderpartiet)	20
Conservative Party (Høyre)	2
Christian Democratic Party (Kristelig Folkeparti)	1
Centre Party (Senterpartiet)	6
Socialist People's Party (Sosialistisk Folkeparti)	2
Total number of members:	31

Sel kommunestyre 1967–1971
Party name (in Norwegian)	Number of representatives
Labour Party (Arbeiderpartiet)	21
Conservative Party (Høyre)	2
Centre Party (Senterpartiet)	6
Socialist People's Party (Sosialistisk Folkeparti)	1
Liberal Party (Venstre)	1
Total number of members:	31

Sel kommunestyre 1963–1967
Party name (in Norwegian)	Number of representatives
Labour Party (Arbeiderpartiet)	12
Joint List(s) of Non-Socialist Parties (Borgerlige Felleslister)	5
Total number of members:	17

Sel herredsstyre 1959–1963
Party name (in Norwegian)	Number of representatives
Labour Party (Arbeiderpartiet)	11
Joint List(s) of Non-Socialist Parties (Borgerlige Felleslister)	6
Total number of members:	17

Sel herredsstyre 1955–1959
Party name (in Norwegian)	Number of representatives
Labour Party (Arbeiderpartiet)	11
Conservative Party (Høyre)	1
Communist Party (Kommunistiske Parti)	1
Farmers' Party (Bondepartiet)	2
Liberal Party (Venstre)	2
Total number of members:	17

Sel herredsstyre 1951–1955
Party name (in Norwegian)	Number of representatives
Labour Party (Arbeiderpartiet)	10
Communist Party (Kommunistiske Parti)	1
Farmers' Party (Bondepartiet)	3
Liberal Party (Venstre)	2
Total number of members:	16

Sel herredsstyre 1947–1951
Party name (in Norwegian)	Number of representatives
Labour Party (Arbeiderpartiet)	9
Communist Party (Kommunistiske Parti)	1
Farmers' Party (Bondepartiet)	3
Joint list of the Liberal Party (Venstre) and the Radical People's Party (Radikale Folkepartiet)	2
Local List(s) (Lokale lister)	1
Total number of members:	16

Sel herredsstyre 1945–1947
Party name (in Norwegian)	Number of representatives
Labour Party (Arbeiderpartiet)	12
Communist Party (Kommunistiske Parti)	1
Local List(s) (Lokale lister)	3
Total number of members:	16

Sel herredsstyre 1937–1940*
Party name (in Norwegian)	Number of representatives
Labour Party (Arbeiderpartiet)	9
Joint list of the Conservative Party (Høyre) and the Farmers' Party (Bondepartiet)	5
Local List(s) (Lokale lister)	2
Total number of members:	16
Note: Due to the German occupation of Norway during World War II, no elections were held for new municipal councils until after the war ended in 1945.

=== Mayors ===
The mayor (Norwegian: ordfører) of Sel Municipality is the political leader of the municipality and the chairperson of the municipal council. Here is a list of people who have held this position:

- 1908–1910: Johan Nygaard
- 1911–1913: Syver Veggum
- 1914–1919: E. Uldalen
- 1920–1922: Anton Bredevangen (AD)
- 1923–1925: Ola S. Bu (Bp)
- 1926–1934: Arthur Janson (Ap)
- 1935–1938: Ole Næprud (Ap)
- 1939–1940: Kristian Lien (Ap)
- 1945–1948: Kristian Lien (Ap)
- 1948–1956: Leif Slåen (Ap)
- 1957–1975: Ola Dahl (Ap)
- 1976–1979: Jarle Fosshagen (Ap)
- 1980–1995: Ivar Grindstuen (Ap)
- 1995–2003: Ola Svaet (Ap)
- 2003–2019: Dag Erik Pryhn (Ap)
- 2019–present: Eldri Siem (Sp)

== Geography ==
Number of minorities (1st and 2nd generation) in Sel by country of origin in 2017
Ancestry	Number
Somalia	57
Poland	43
Eritrea	38
Syria	35
Lithuania	25
Thailand	19
Ethiopia	16

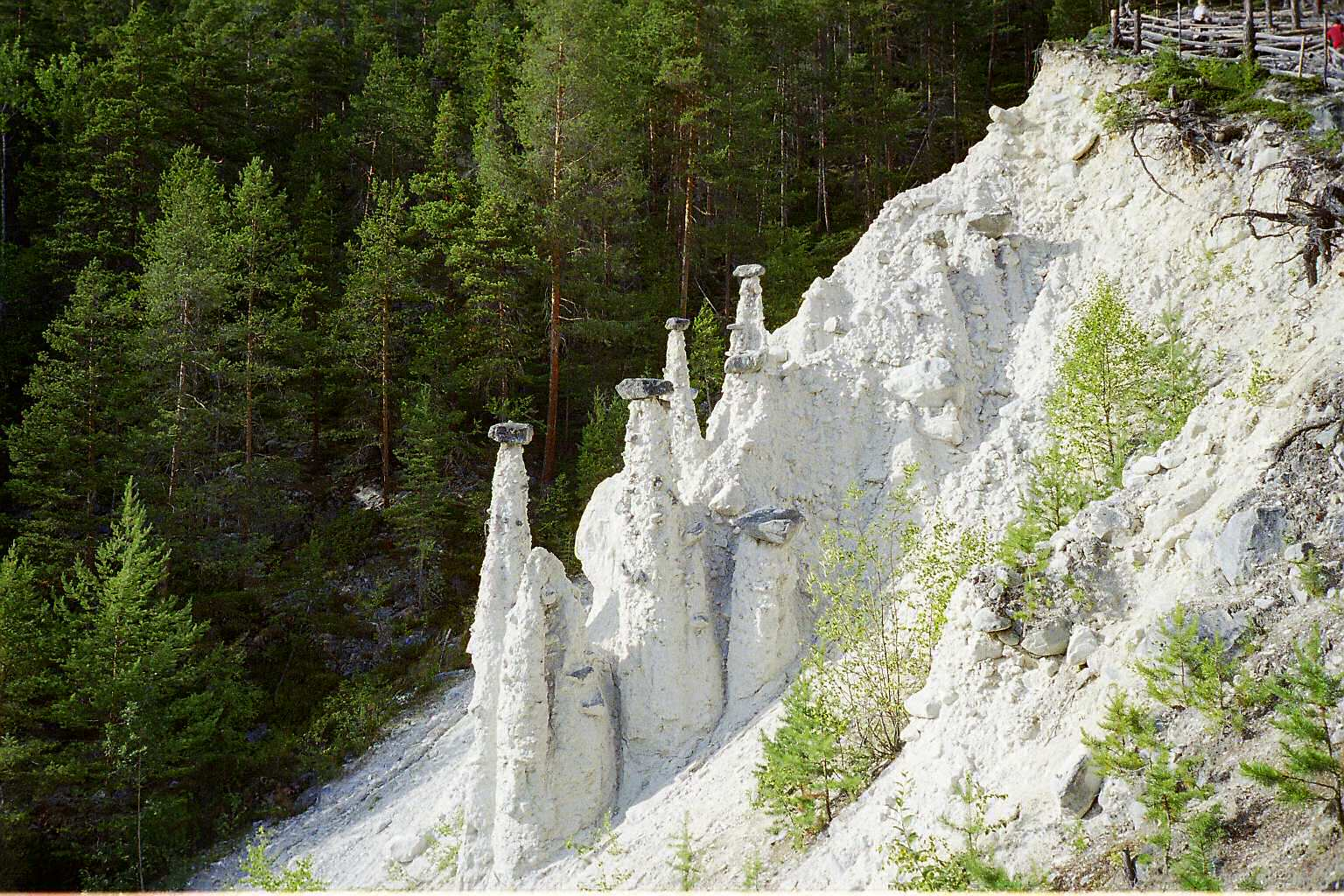
Kvitskriuprestene - White Priests - soil pyramids near Sinclairstøtten in Sel.

Sel Municipality is bordered on the north by Dovre Municipality and Vågå Municipality, and on the south by Nord-Fron Municipality. To the northeast it is bordered by Folldal Municipality. Large parts of the very first national park in Norway, Rondane National Park is situated in Sel Municipality and has its main entrances from the mountain villages of Høvringen and Mysuseter. The Jutulhogget canyon is located in the park. The highest point in the municipality is the 2,138.65-metre (7,016.6 ft) tall mountain Storronden.

Although it has a small population, Sel Municipality is one of the more scenic and historically significant areas of the Gudbrandsdalen valley. A large concentration of Norway's heritage-listed farms are located in the Heidal valley in Sel Municipality (Heidal Municipality became part of Sel Municipality in 1965).

The town of Otta, named after the Otta River, is the main population center in the municipality. Otta lies at the point where the Otta River joins the Gudbrandsdalslågen river from the west. The Otta River leads up to the historically important Vågå and Lom regions and the passes to the west into the Jotunheimen mountain range.

== Attractions ==
- Jørundgard Medieval Center - This reconstructed 14th century medieval farm, the location of Sigrid Undset's novel "Kristin Lavransdatter", was the site of a 1994 filming of Kransen. The buildings were furnished in medieval style for the film. It is open to the public and traditional crafts are demonstrated by staff, providing a uniquely medieval look at Norwegian history.
- Pilgrim's Route/Old Kings Road - The Pilgrim's Route and Old King's Road passes through Sel Municipality on its way through the Gudbrandsdalen valley and northwards over Dovrefjell mountains near present-day Dombås in Dovre Municipality.
- Selsverket - Sel Municipality has a long tradition in mining and quarrying for minerals, soapstone, and slate. Selsverket was the copper works from the 18th century which was located approximately 2 kilometers north of Otta. There were also copper works in neighboring Folldal Municipality.
- Sel Church - The church at Selsverket was built in 1742. It is constructed of logs.
- Steinberget Fortress - Built in the pre-Christian period, the Steinberget fortress is now a jumble of rock along European route E6.
- Kringen - In 1612, a peasant militia ambushed Scots marching to support Sweden at Kringen (the narrowest part of the Gudbrand Valley, just below the confluence of the Otta and the Gudbrandsdalslågen). As the Scots reached the ambush site of Prillarguri hill, legend has it that Prillar-Guri, riding on the other side of the lågen, distracted the Scots until they were in the right position. She then sounded a blast with her prillarhorn (a ram's horn), and the Battle of Kringen began. A monument can be found there today, and she's also found on Sel's coat-of-arms today.
- Hilltop Fortress - West of Prillarguri hill is another hilltop fortress, protected by a sheer drop on three sides and walls on the fourth side, which was built in the period from 300 to 600 AD.
- Ula Dam - In 1877-1879 the Norwegian parliament ordered construction of the Ula Dam to stop gravel and rock transported by the Ula River from blocking the Gudbrandsdalslågen and flooding the fertile valley floor. The debris washed down by the Ula in 1789 destroyed the houses at Selsverket and rerouted the Gudbrandsdalslågen, such that the farms along the Sel became marshes.

== In literature and legend ==
- Sel Municipality is where Kristin Lavransdatter, a fictitious Norwegian woman living in the 14th century, grows up. Kristin Lavransdatter is a trilogy of historical novels written by the 1928 Nobel laureate Sigrid Undset.
- Prillar-Guri or Prillarguri is a semi-legendary figure who, according to oral tradition, was a woman from Sel, Norway who played a key role in the Battle of Kringen in August 1612

== Notable people ==
- Paul Thorsen Harildstad (1764 in Heidal – 1843), a farmer and representative at the Norwegian Constitutional Assembly at Eidsvoll
- Olav Kringen (1867 in Sel – 1951), a newspaper editor and politician from 1887 to 1897 in USA
- Erling Steineide (1938 in Heidal – 2019), a cross-country skier, participated at the 1964 Winter Olympics
- Hans Ola Sørlie (1953 in Otta – 1988), an actor
- Even Aleksander Hagen (born 1988 in Otta), a Norwegian politician and County Mayor of Oppland

== Media gallery ==
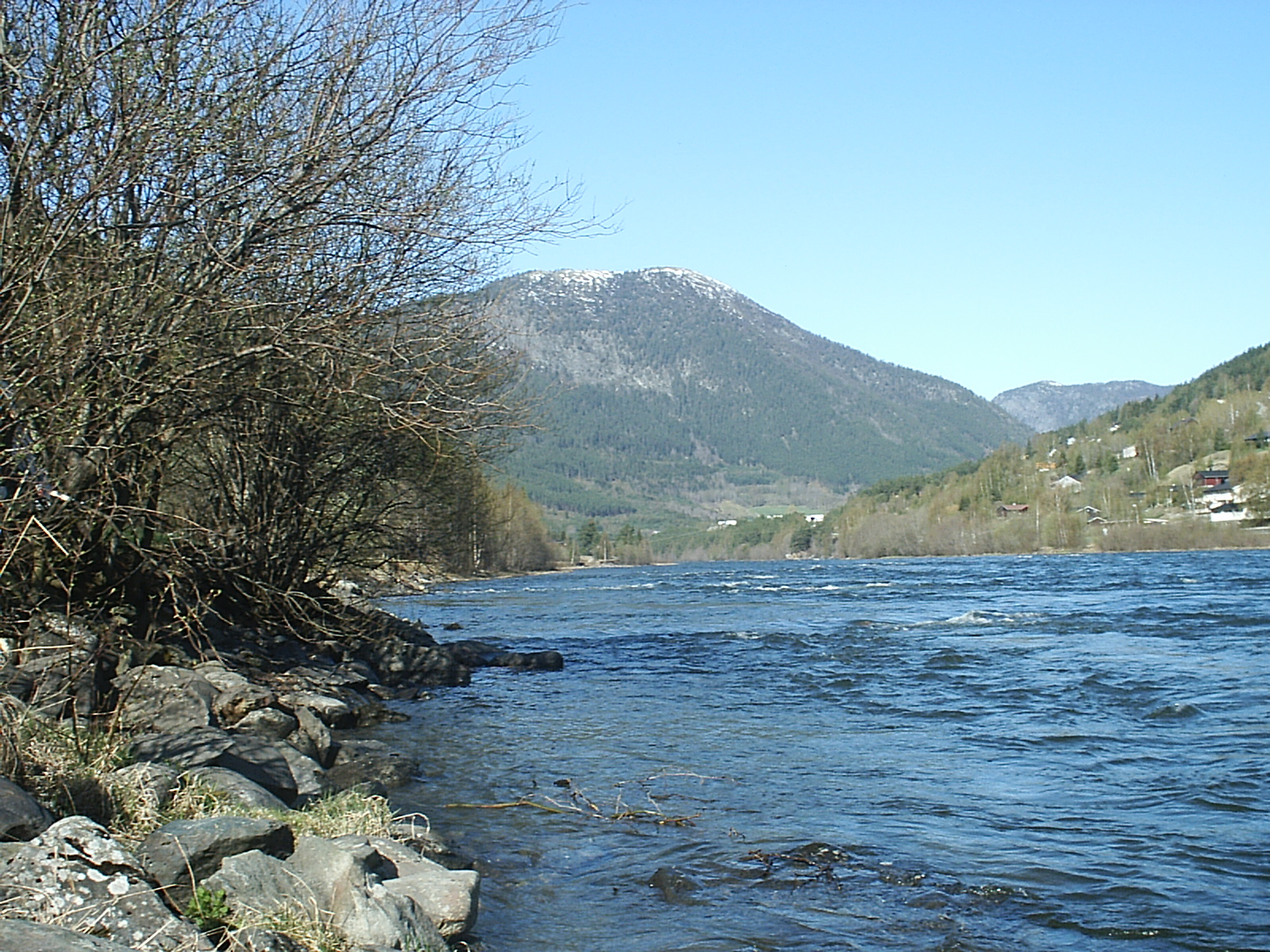
Otta River

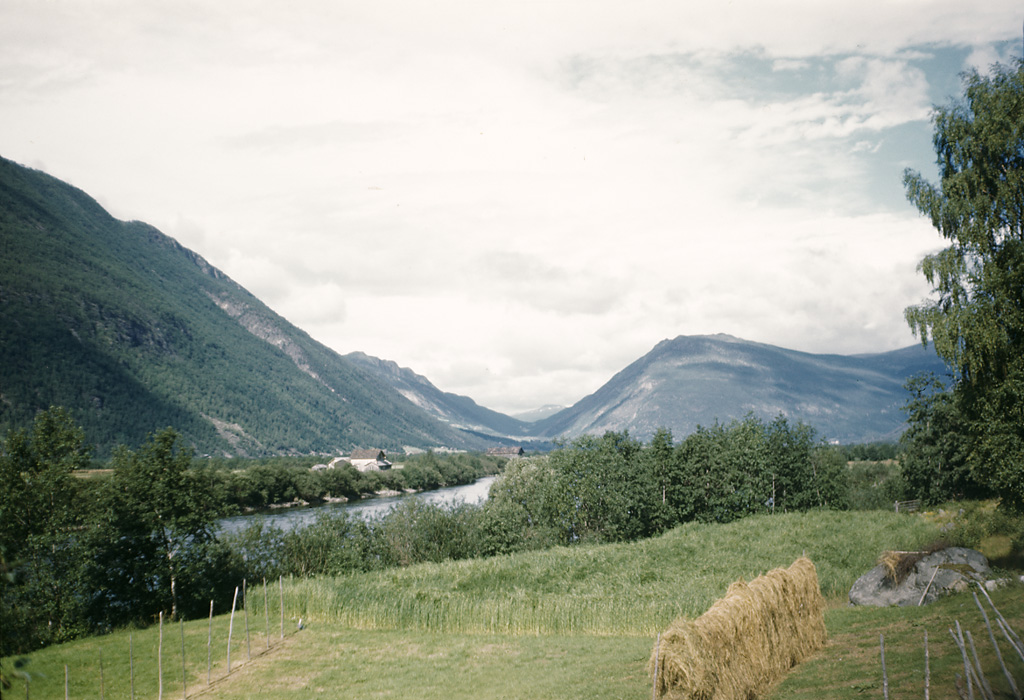
Gudbrandsdalen Valley

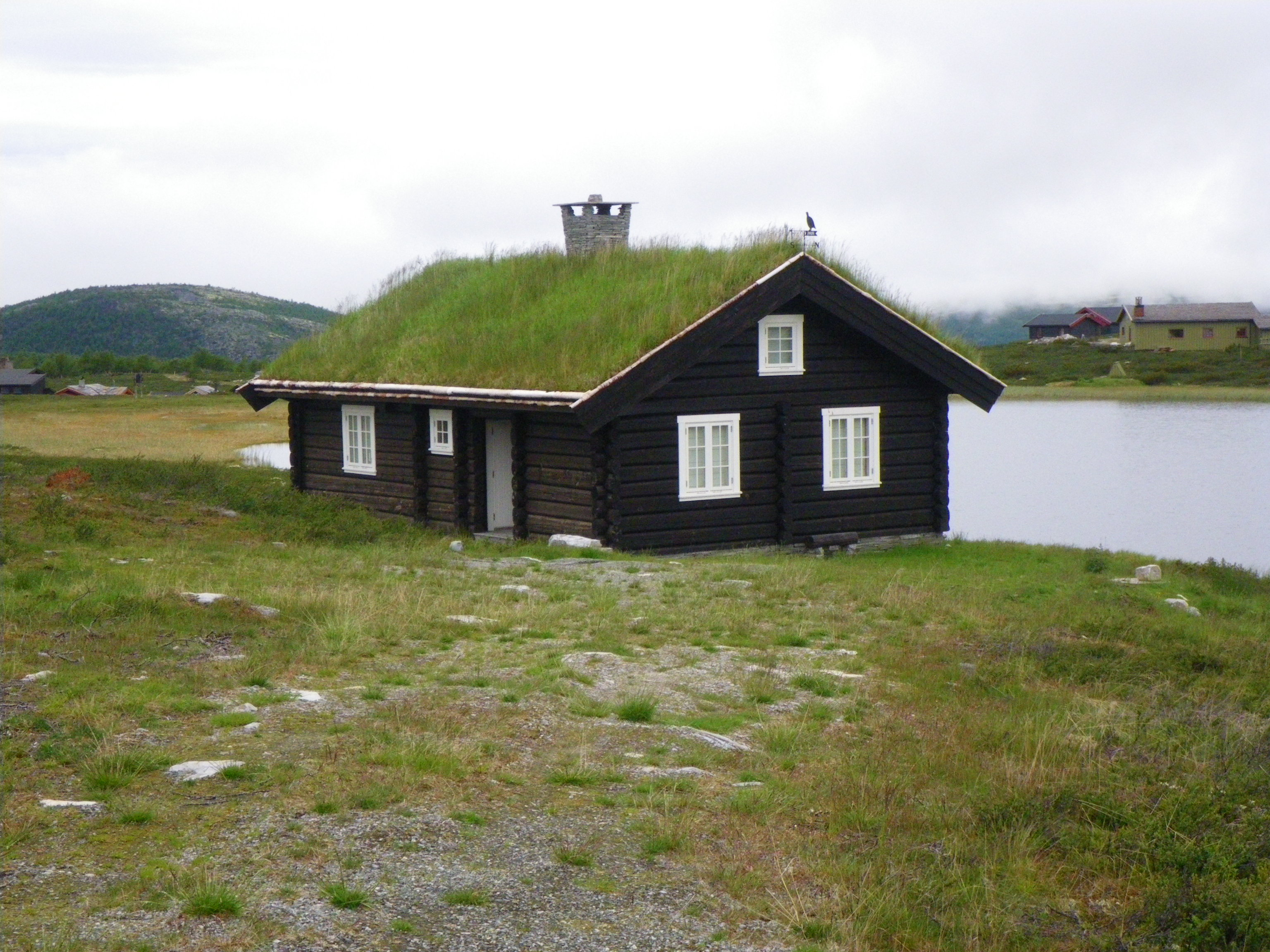
Rondane

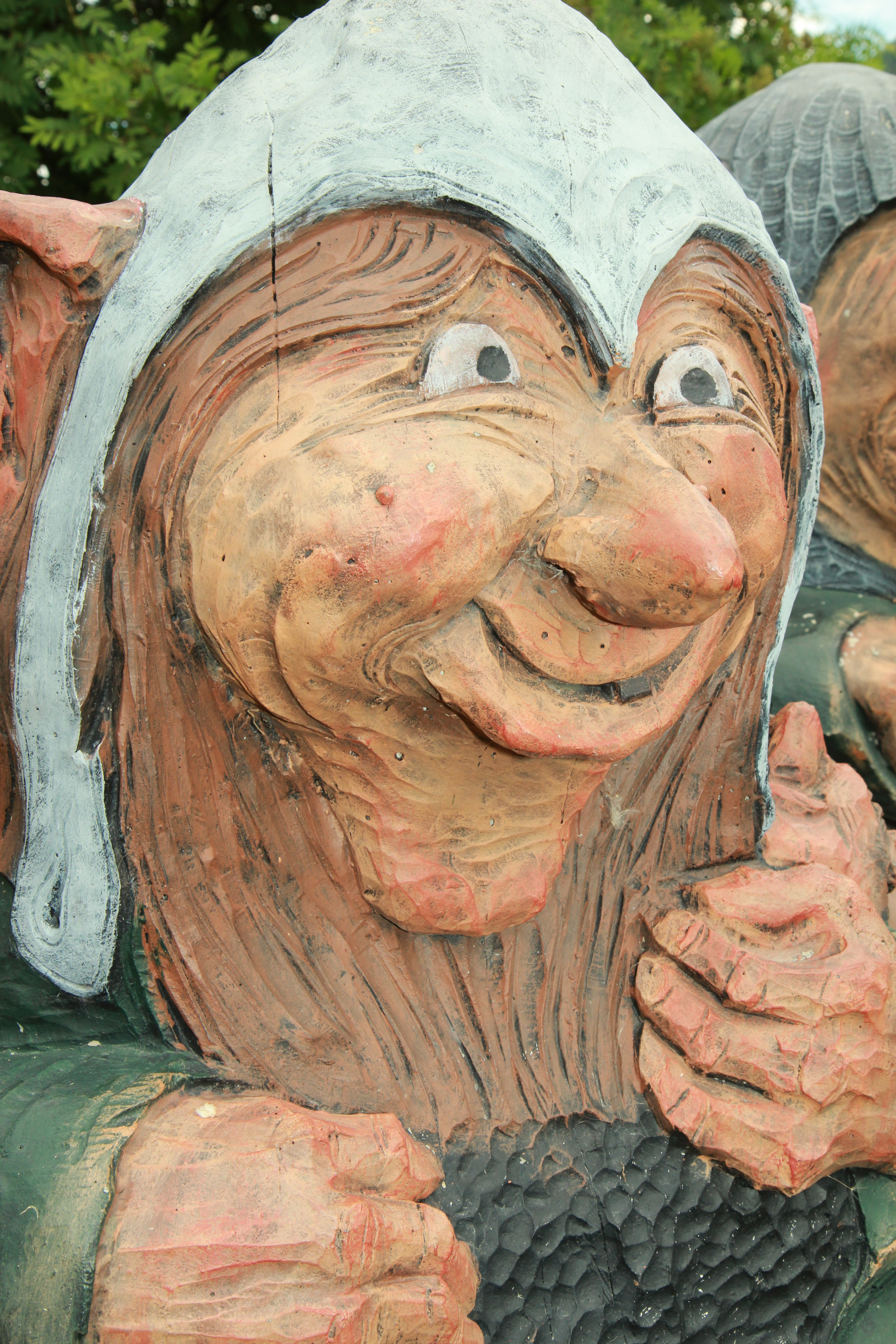
A carved troll woman in the Gudbrandsdalen Valley
