= Dombås Church =

Church in Innlandet, Norway

- Dombås kyrkje
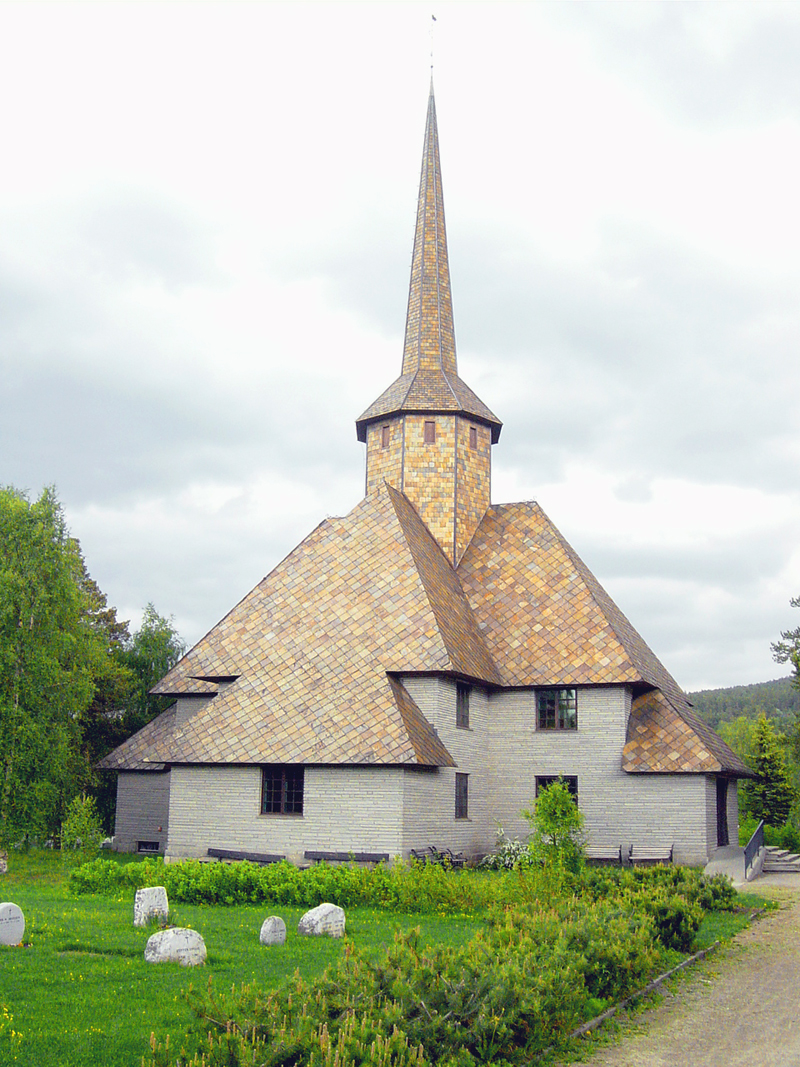
- View of the church
- Dombås Church
- 62°04′30″N 9°07′28″E
- Location: Dovre Municipality, Innlandet
- Country: Norway
- Denomination: Church of Norway
- Churchmanship: Evangelical Lutheran

History
- Status: Parish church
- Founded: 1939
- Consecrated: 24 September 1939
- Events: Fire (2020)

Architecture
- Functional status: Active
- Architect(s): Magnus Poulsson and Esben Poulsson
- Architectural type: Cruciform
- Completed: 1939 (87 years ago)

Specifications
- Capacity: 300
- Materials: Wood

Administration
- Diocese: Hamar bispedømme
- Deanery: Nord-Gudbrandsdal prosti
- Parish: Dombås
- Norwegian Cultural Heritage Site
- Type: Church
- Status: Protected
- ID: 84029

Dombås Church (Norwegian: Dombås kirke) is a parish church of the Church of Norway in Dovre Municipality in Innlandet county, Norway. It is located in the village of Dombås. It is one of the two churches for the Dombås parish which is part of the Nord-Gudbrandsdal prosti (deanery) in the Diocese of Hamar. The gray, stone church was built in an cruciform design in 1939 using plans drawn up by the architects Magnus and Espen Poulsson. The church seats about 300 people.

== History ==
The village of Dombås rapidly grew during the early 20th century due to the railway and tourism. Fundraising and planning began in the 1920s. In 1928, a plot of land was purchased. The architect Sverre Pedersen was hired to design the new church, but his plans were not liked by the building committee, so they hired Magnus Poulsson instead. Poulsson intended to build a church inspired by the old wooden stave churches, but a new stone quarry opened nearby, and it was decided to use that stone instead. The new church was completed in 1939 with the consecration service being held on 24 September 1939.

On 20 February 2020, the church was set on fire in a case of arson. The fire caused extensive damages to the interior as well as the roof and tower, totaling about 20 million kr to repair the building. The man who set fire to the church was a Somali national who came to Norway in 2015. The man claimed to have seen on the news that a Norwegian had burned a Qur'an and had not been punished. This greatly angered him and it led him to set fire to the Dombås Church as well as attempt to set fire to the nearby Sel Church. The man admitted to these crimes and was sentenced to four years and two months in prison. The church was repaired and rebuilt in 2020–2021.

== Media gallery ==
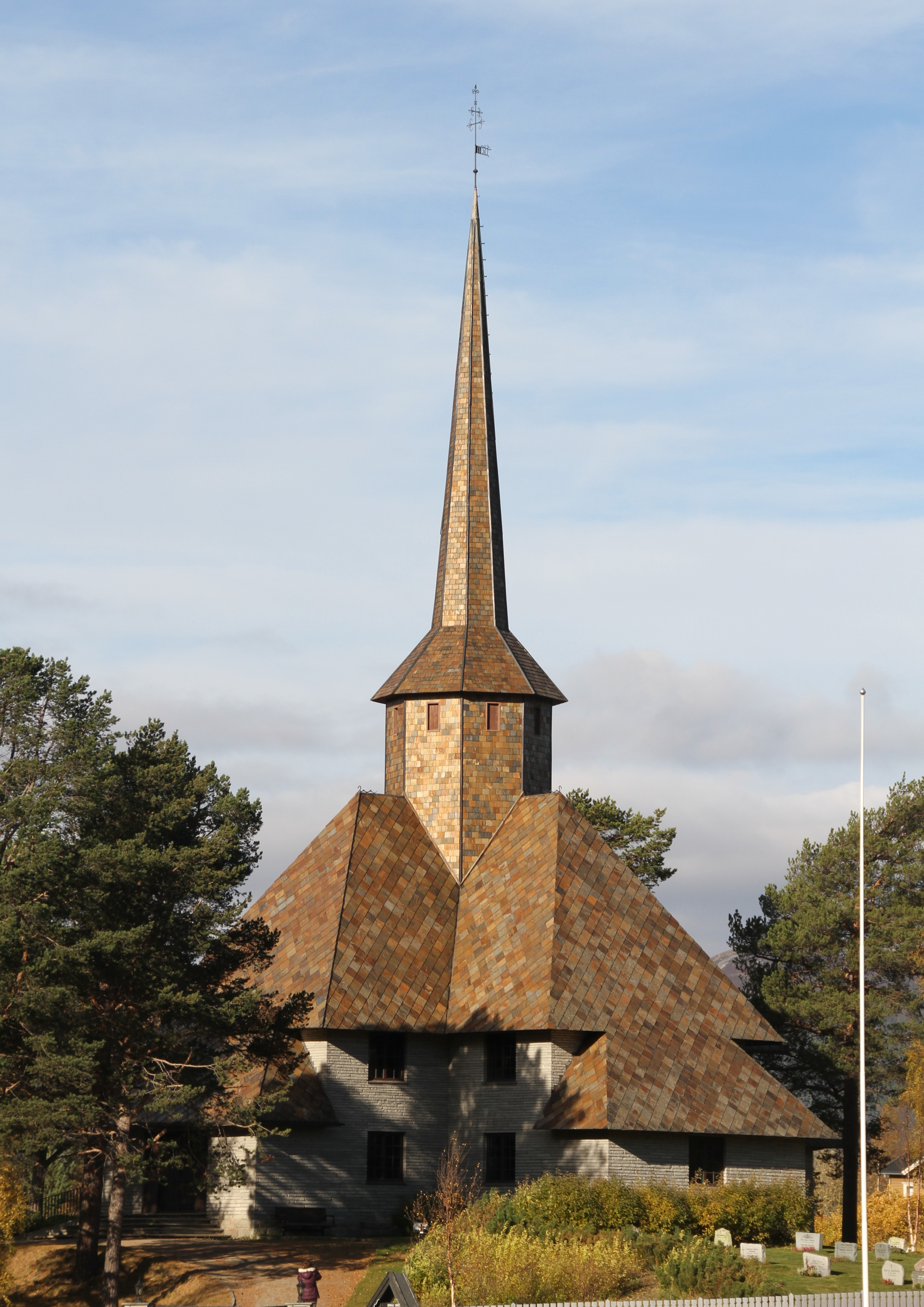

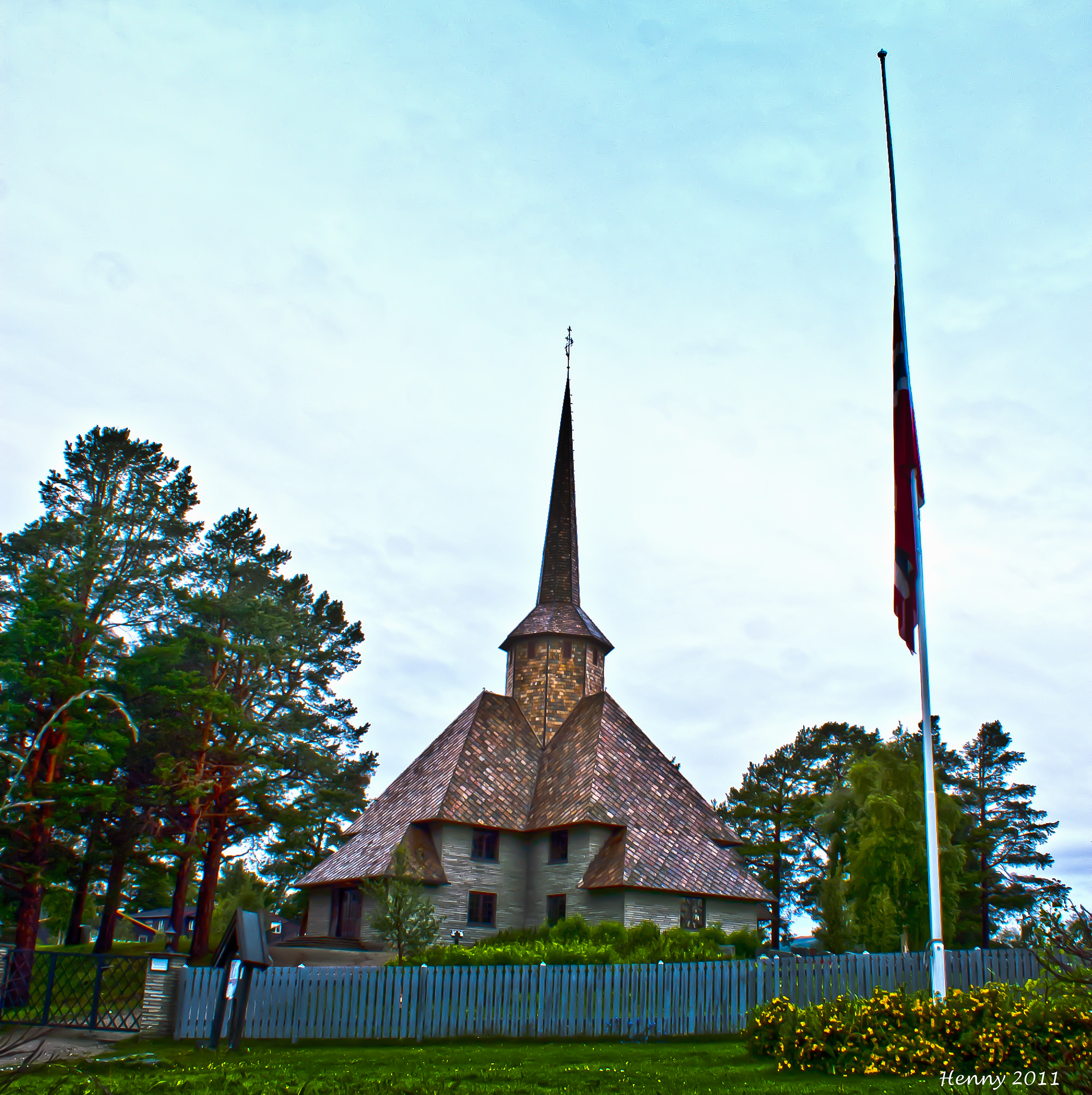

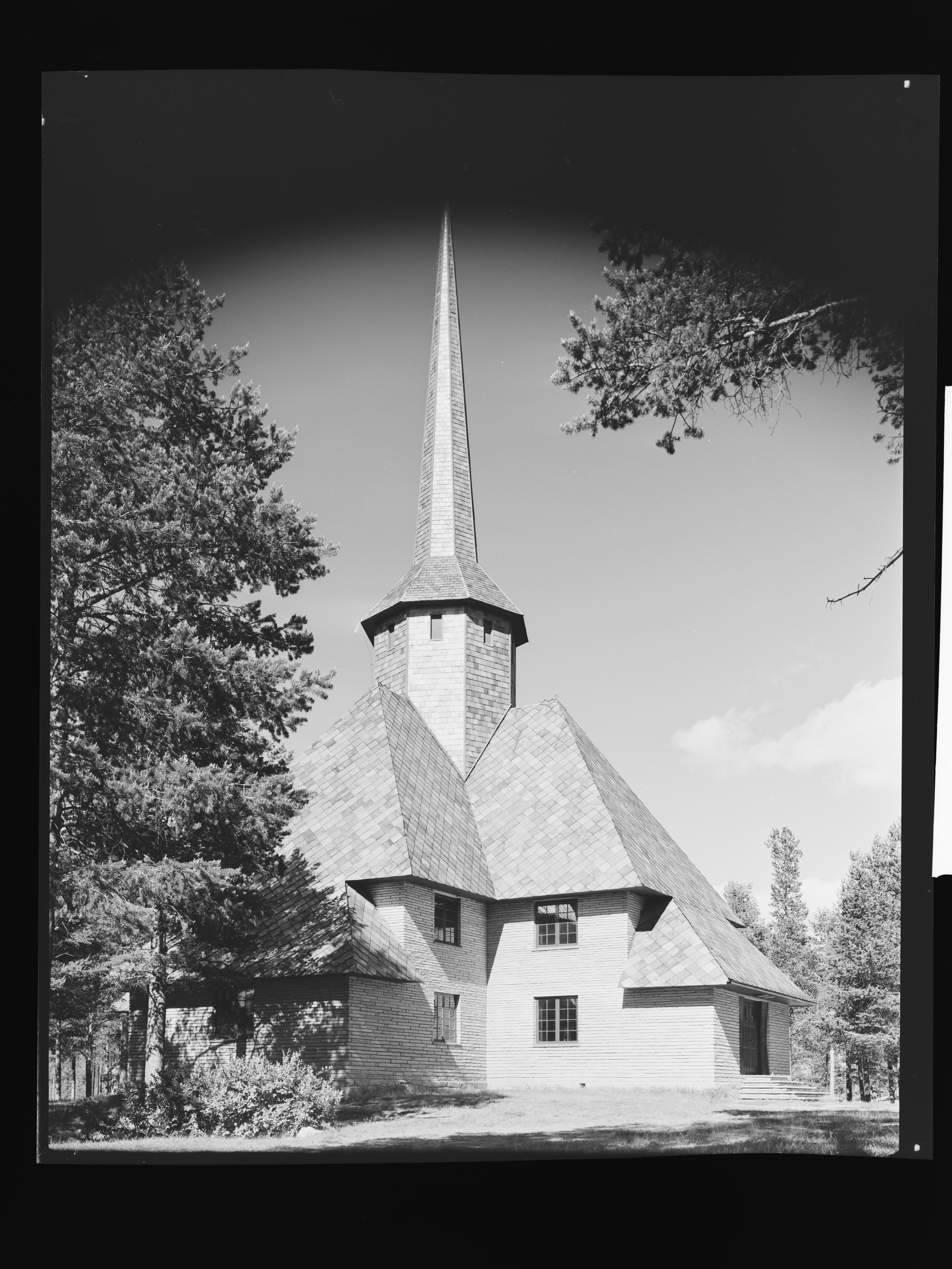

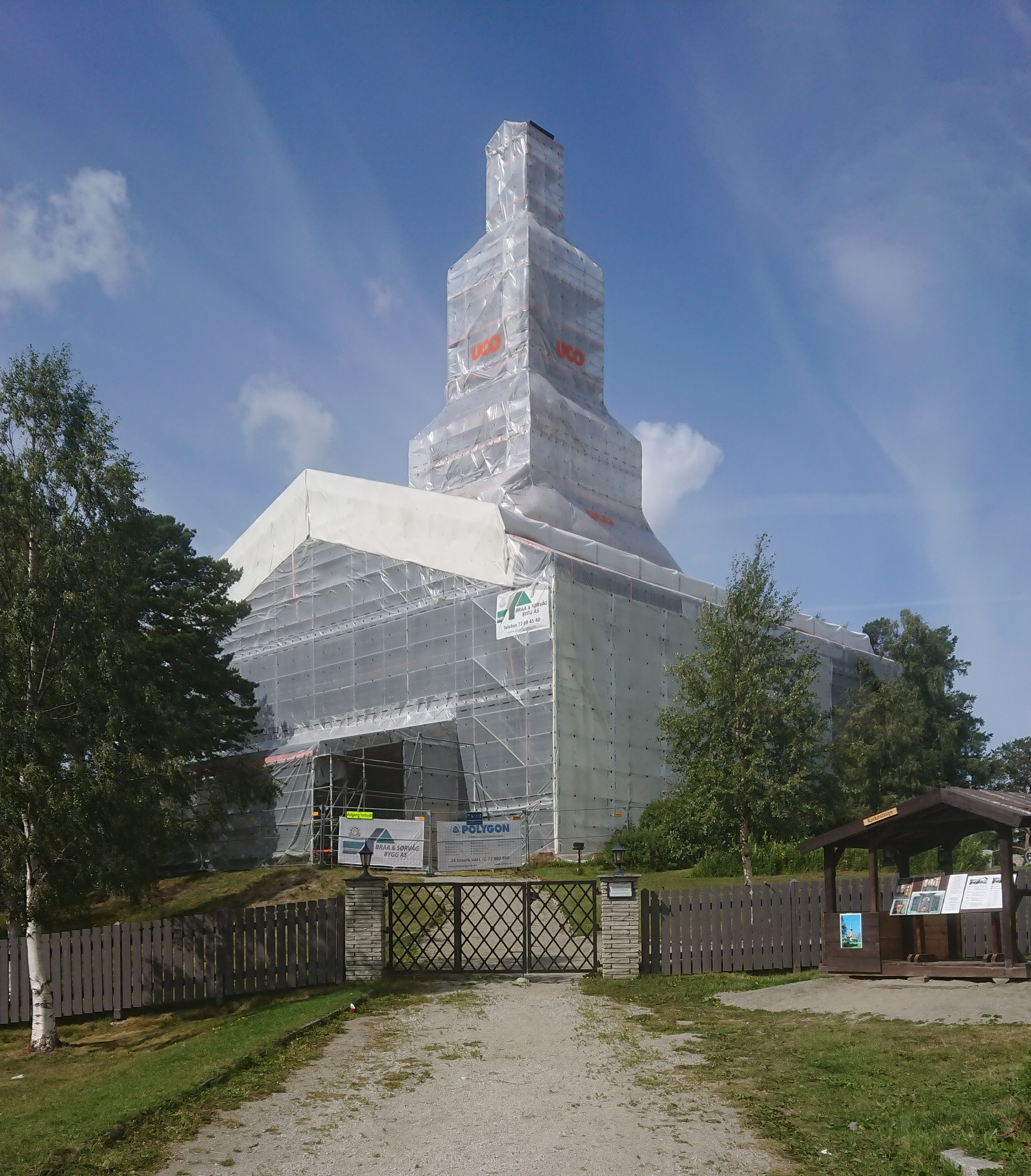
Reconstruction work in 2021

== See also ==
- List of churches in Hamar
