= Sel Church =

Church in Innlandet, Norway

- Sel kyrkje
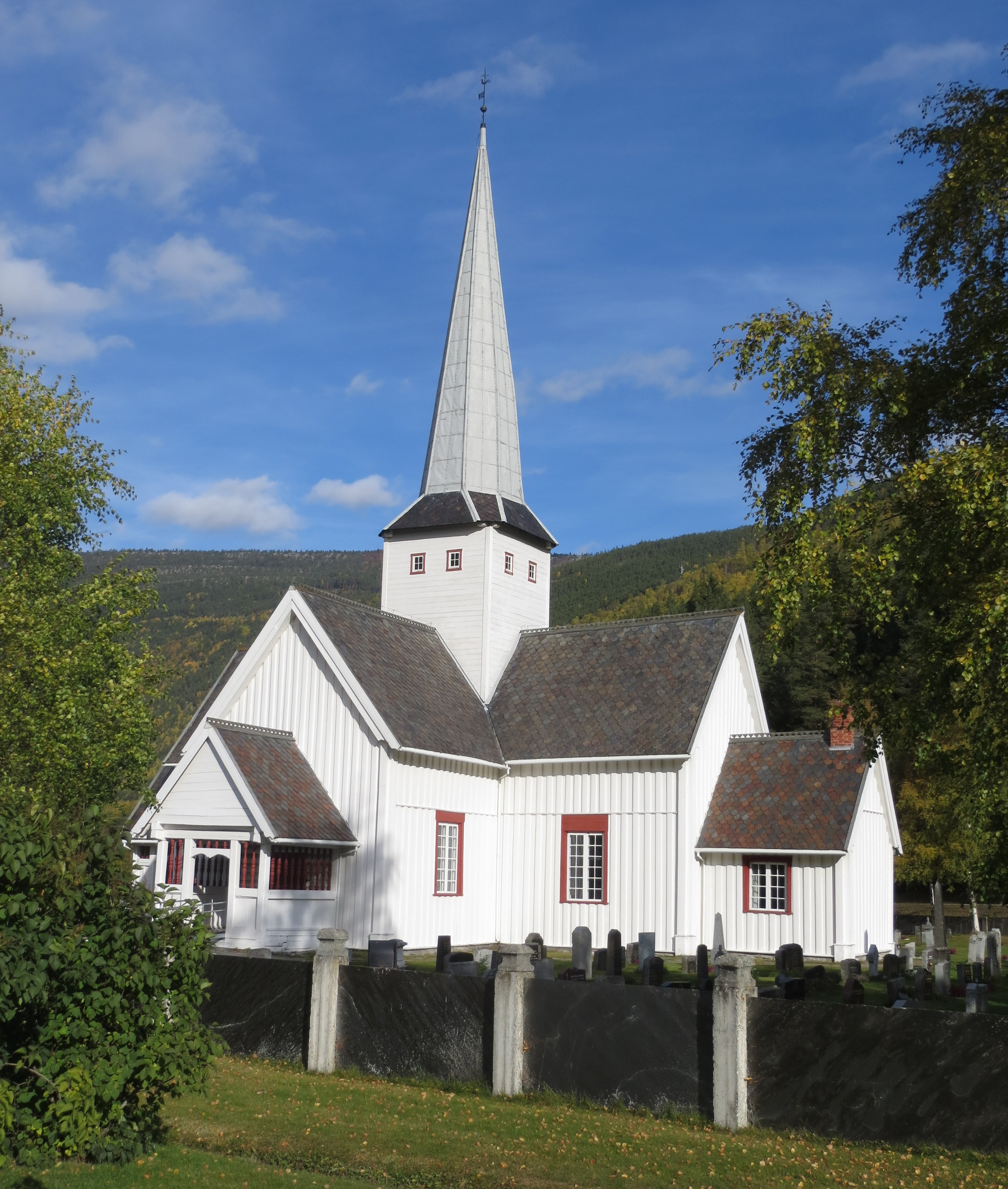
- View of the church
- Sel Church
- 61°48′06″N 9°33′11″E
- Location: Sel Municipality, Innlandet
- Country: Norway
- Denomination: Church of Norway
- Previous denomination: Catholic Church
- Churchmanship: Evangelical Lutheran

History
- Status: Parish church
- Founded: 13th century
- Consecrated: 1742

Architecture
- Functional status: Active
- Architect: Knut Syversen Moen
- Architectural type: Cruciform
- Completed: 1742 (284 years ago)

Specifications
- Capacity: 250
- Materials: Wood

Administration
- Diocese: Hamar bispedømme
- Deanery: Nord-Gudbrandsdal prosti
- Parish: Sel
- Norwegian Cultural Heritage Site
- Type: Church
- Status: Automatically protected
- ID: 85413

Sel Church (Norwegian: Sel kyrkje) is a parish church of the Church of Norway in Sel Municipality in Innlandet county, Norway. It is located in the village of Selsverket. It is the church for the Sel parish which is part of the Nord-Gudbrandsdal prosti (deanery) in the Diocese of Hamar. The white, wooden church was built in a cruciform design in 1742 using plans drawn up by the architect Knut Syversen Moen. The church seats about 250 people.

== History ==
The first church in Sel was a wooden stave church that was likely built in the 13th century. The first church was built at the Romundgård farm in Nord-Sel, about 9 kilometres (5.6 mi) northwest of the present site of the church. In 1628, the old church underwent a major renovation, rebuilding most of the church. This project was completed in 1630. By 1723, the church was described as being in poor condition when the King put the church up for sale at an auction to help raise money to pay down the debt from the Great Northern War. The church was purchased by the villagers of the parish for 1400 riksdaler. Immediately, the new owners began talking about the poor condition of the building and the idea of moving the church. During the late-1600s, the copper smelter in Selsverket drew a lot of the population further down the valley and so many villagers wanted to move the church closer to the main population center. The parish received permission to move the church in 1738.

In 1742, a new timber-framed cruciform church was built at Selsverket. The builders are said to have been the homeowners Knut Syversen Moen (who designed the building) and Jo Hansen Moen. The church was a cruciform design made out of five squares, a center square measuring 6.3 by 6.3 metres (21 ft × 21 ft) and then another square of the same size on each side of it, creating a cross design. The new church was taken into use in 1742 before it was completely finished. A lot of the church inventory (altarpiece, pulpit, and baptismal font) were brought with from the old church in Romundgård and put into use in the new church. After the new church was completed, the old church was torn down. In 1870, exterior paneling was installed to help improve the insulation of the church. The church was restored in 1915–1920. It then got a new floor, the choir floor was raised, and electric light was installed. The church was restored again in 1980, this time it was re-insulated to ensure it was able to be used on the coldest of days.

On 20 February 2020, the church was almost set on fire in a case of attempted arson. The man who attempted to set fire to the church was a Somali national who came to Norway in 2015. The man claimed to have seen on the news that a Norwegian had burned a Qur'an and had not been punished. This greatly angered him and it led him to set fire to the nearby Dombås Church (causing lots of damage) as well as attempt to set fire to the Sel Church. The man admitted to these crimes and was sentenced to four years and two months in prison. Dombås Church was repaired and rebuilt in 2020–2021, costing about 20 million kr.

== Media gallery ==
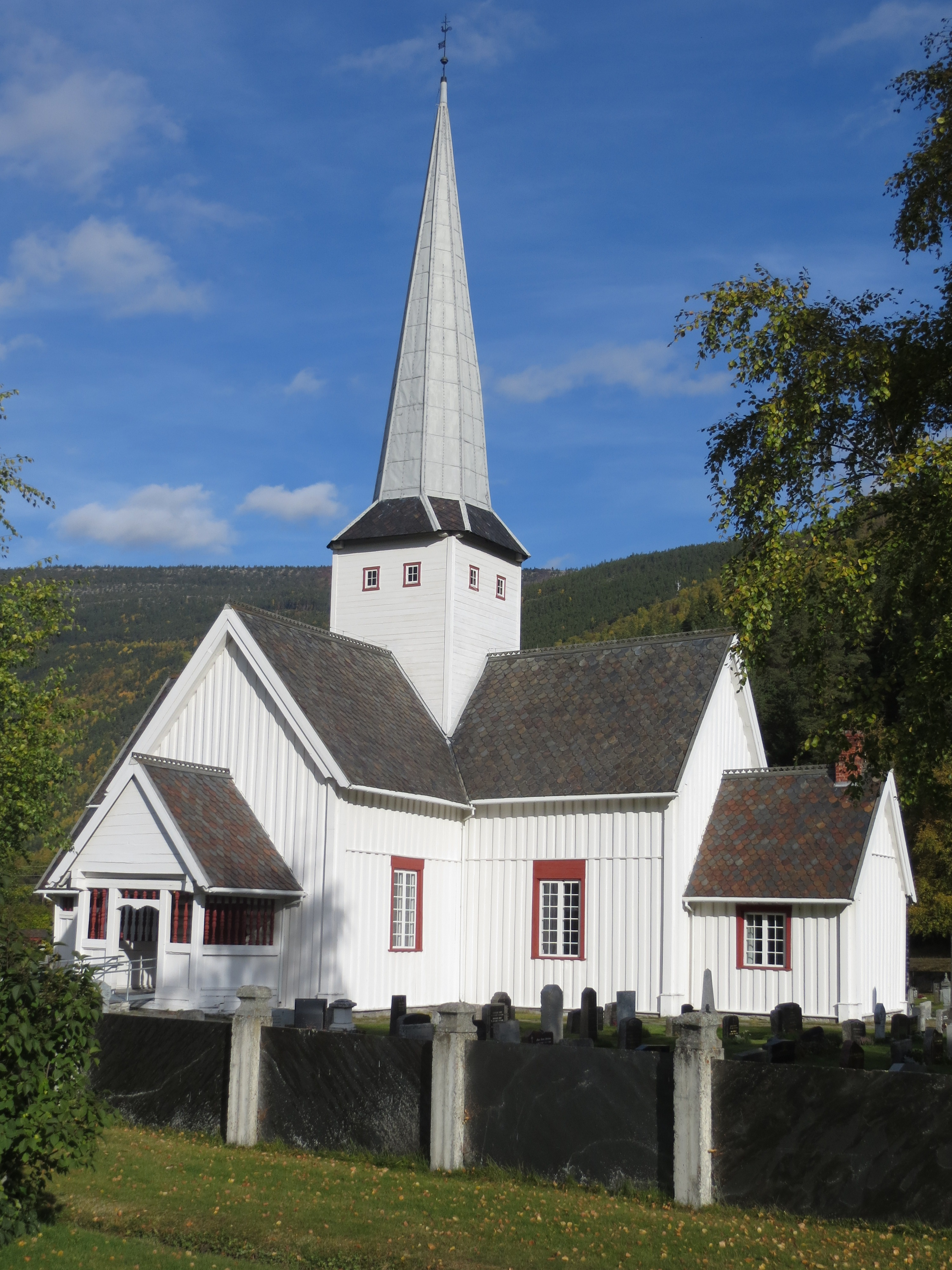

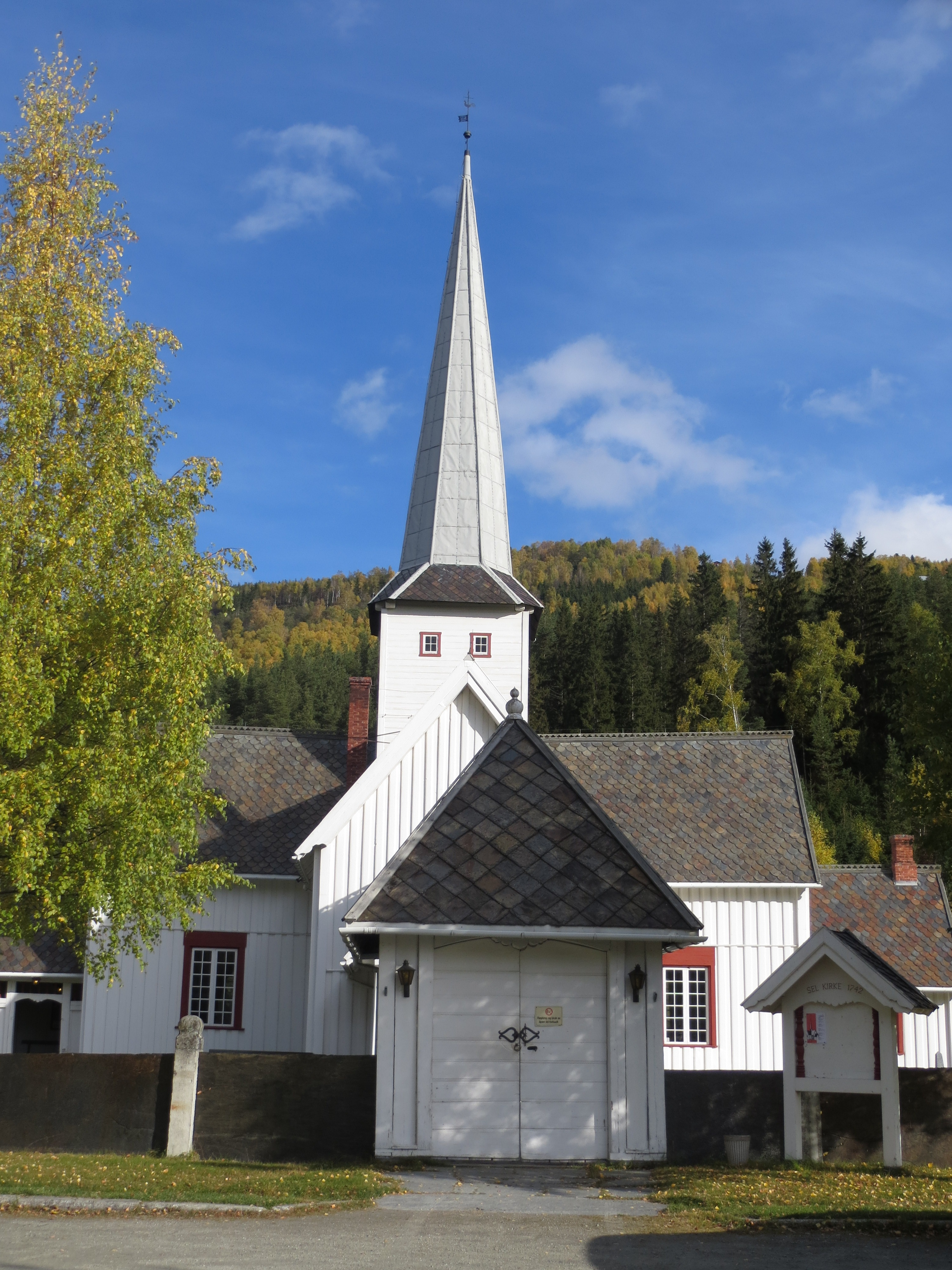

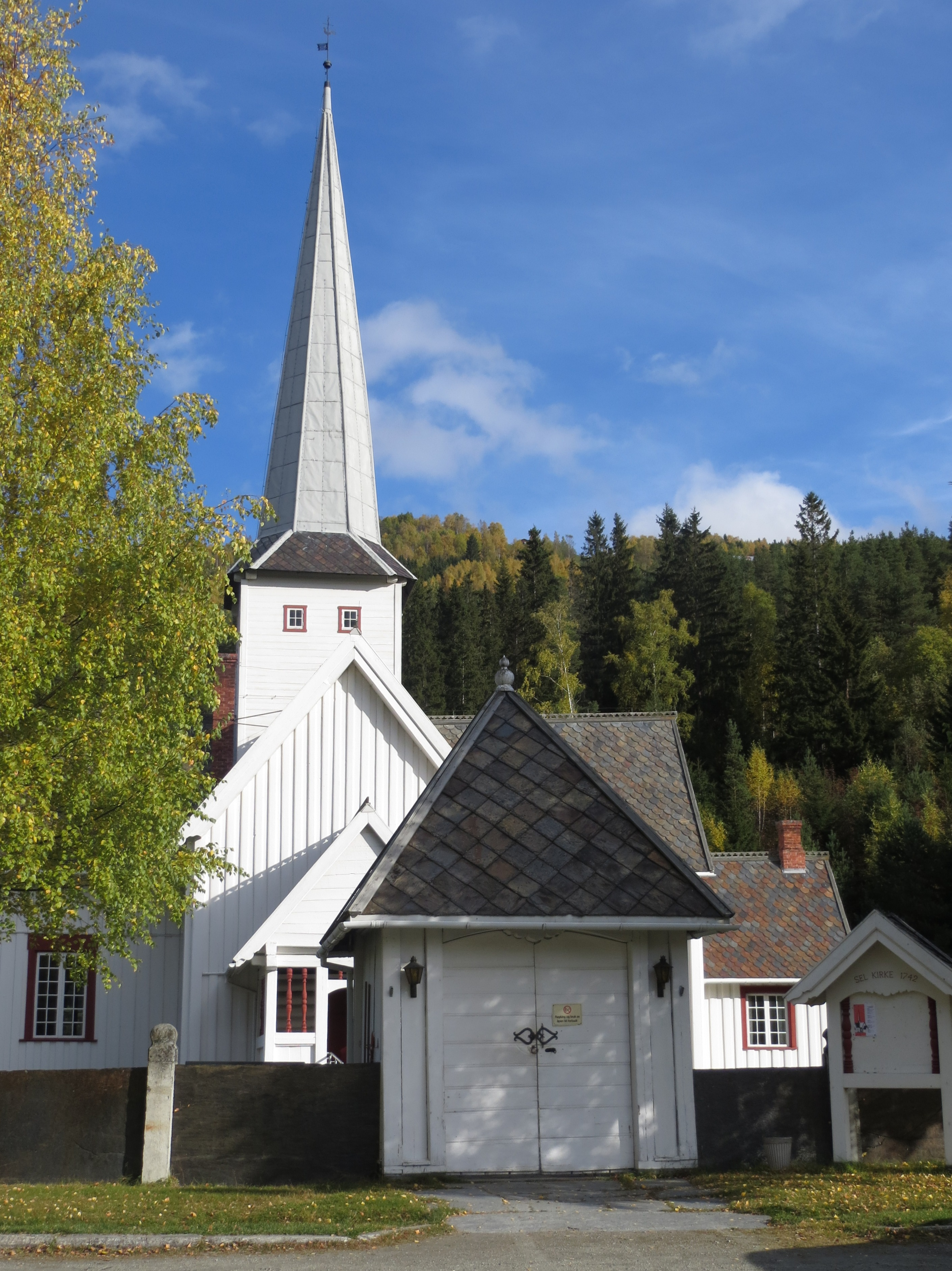

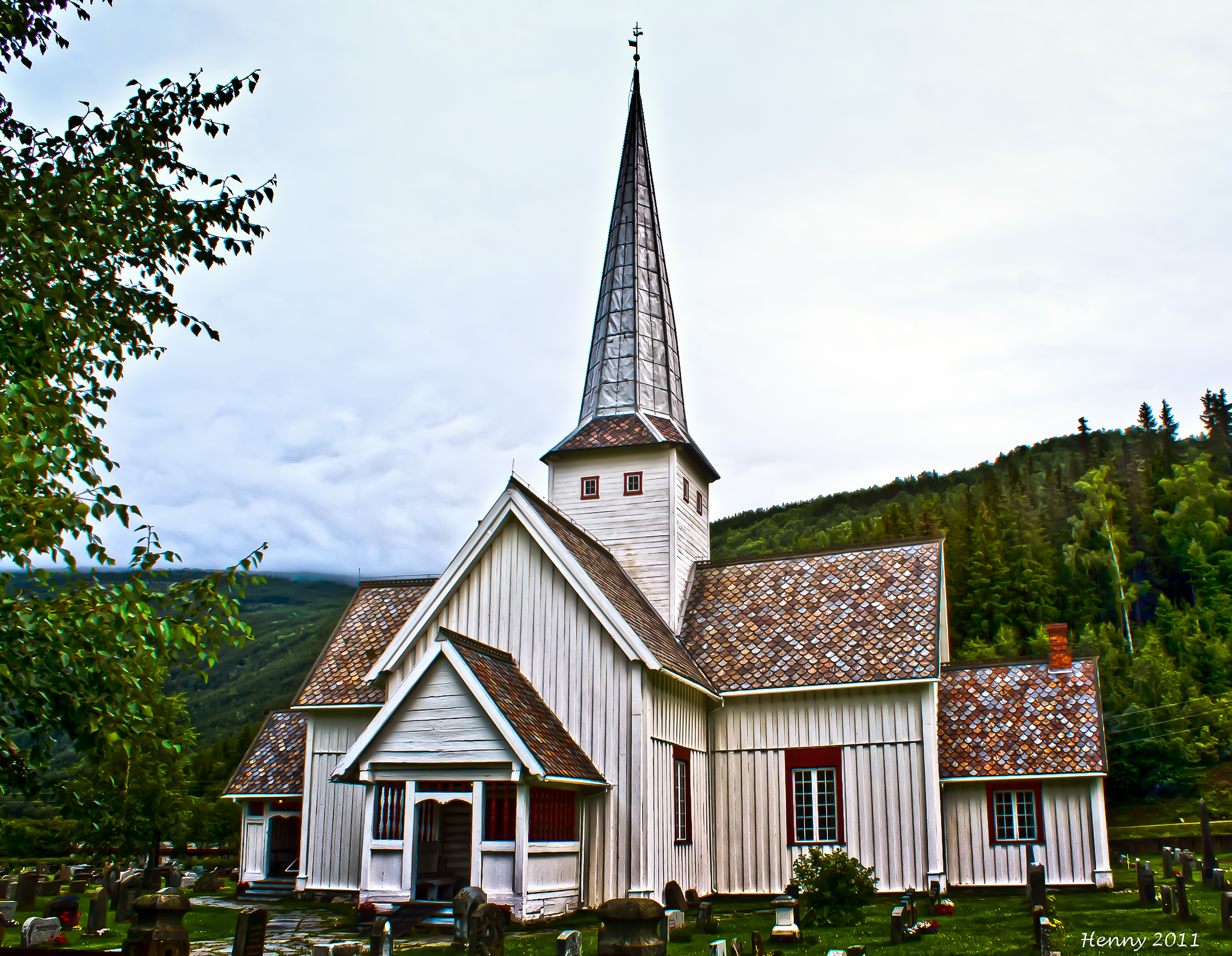

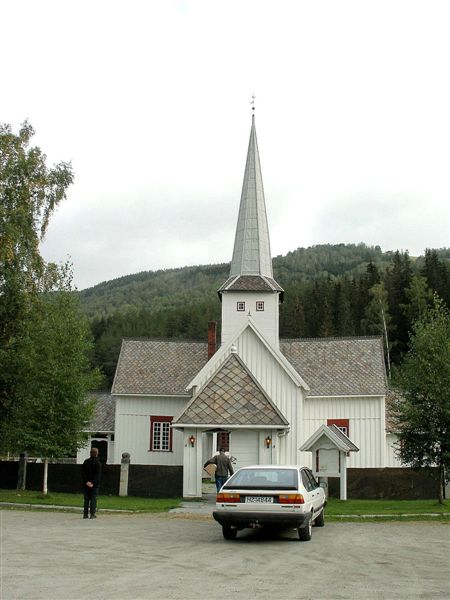

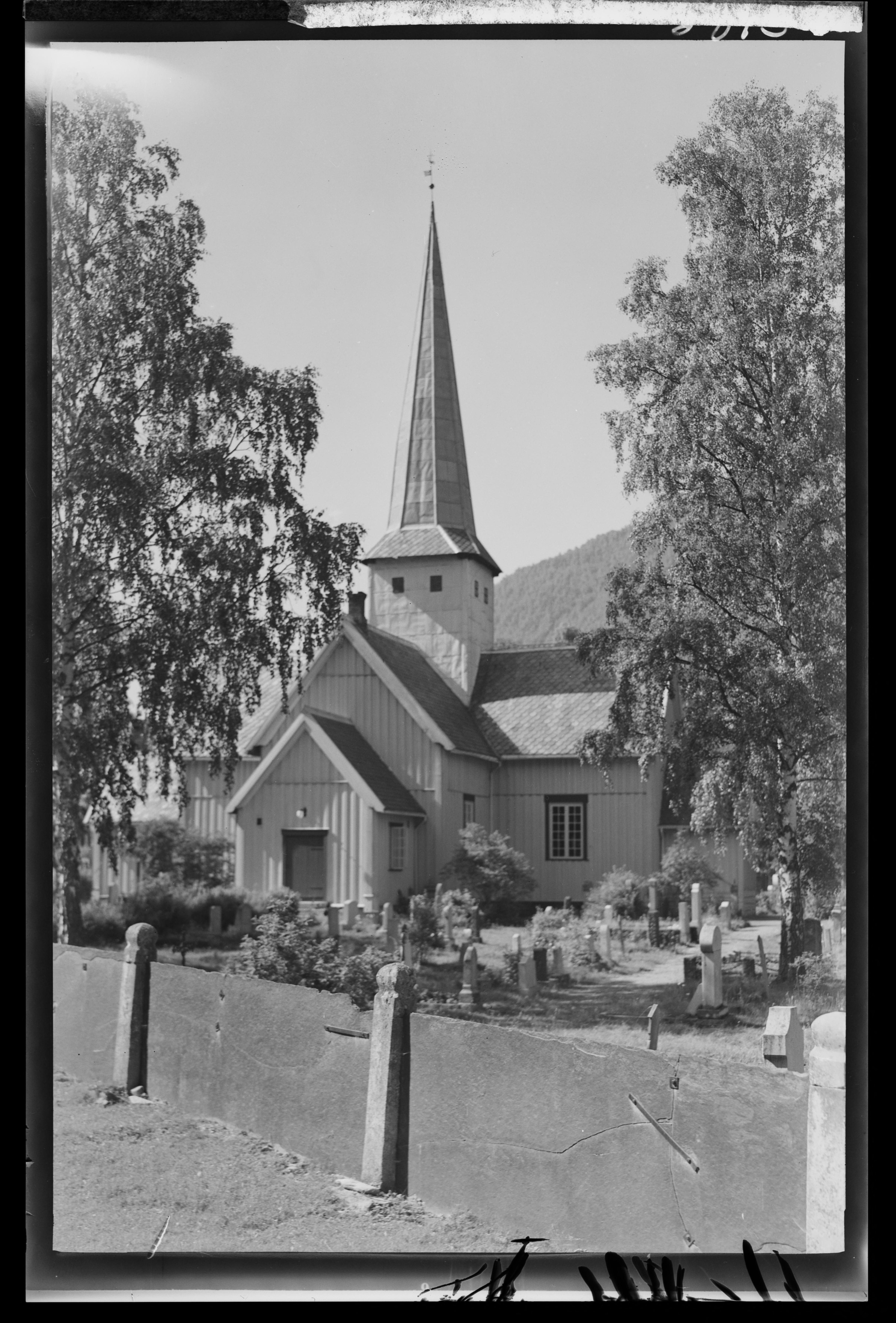

== See also ==
- List of churches in Hamar
