= Sandbumoen =

Village in Sel Municipality, Norway

- Village
- Interactive map of Sandbumoen
- Location within Innlandet Location within Norway
- Coordinates: 61.72803°N 9.55006°E
- Country: Norway
- Region: Eastern Norway
- County: Innlandet
- District: Gudbrandsdalen
- Municipality: Sel Municipality

Area
  - Total: 0.24 km^{2} (0.093 sq mi)
- Elevation: 332 m (1,089 ft)

Population (2024)
  - Total: 241
  - Density: 1,004/km^{2} (2,600/sq mi)
- Time zone: UTC+01:00 (CET)
  - Summer (DST): UTC+02:00 (CEST)
- Post Code: 2670 Otta

Sandbumoen is a village in Sel Municipality in Innlandet county, Norway. The village is located along the Gudbrandsdalslågen river, about 5 kilometres (3.1 mi) south of the town of Otta and about the same distance north of the village of Sjoa. The European route E6 highway and the Dovrebanen railway line both pass through the village.

The 0.24-square-kilometre (59-acre) village has a population (2024) of 241 and a population density of 1,004 inhabitants per square kilometre (2,600/sq mi).

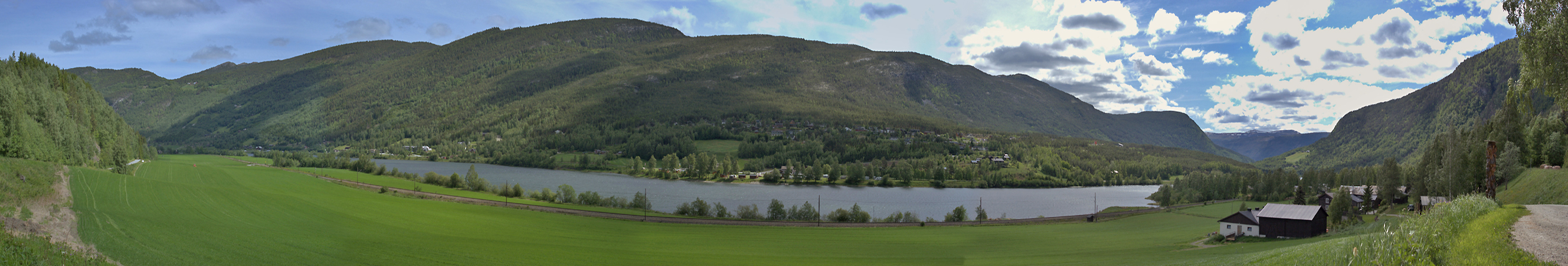
View of the village area
