= Sjoa (village) =

Village in Sel Municipality, Norway

- Village
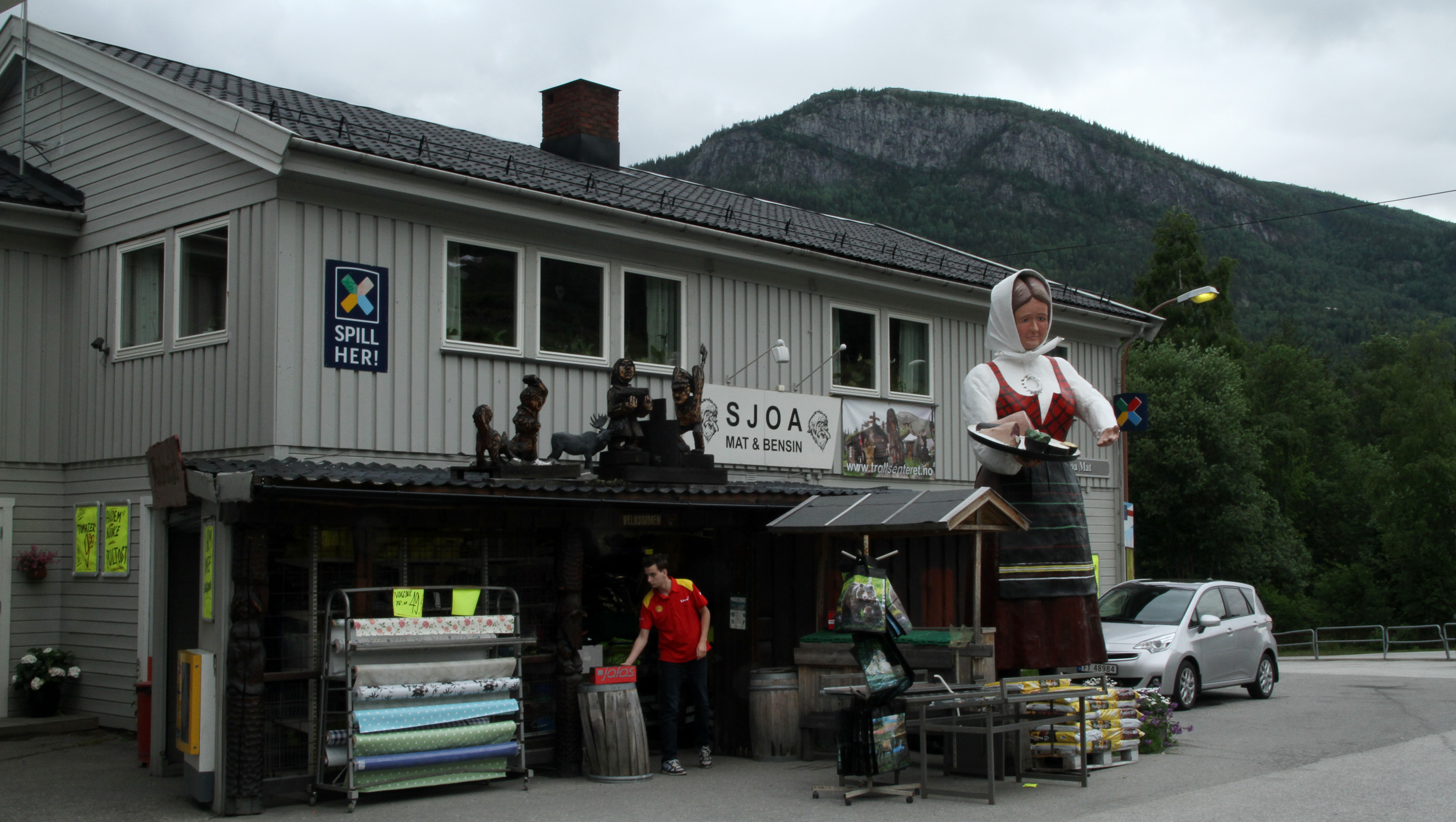
- View of the village
- Interactive map of Sjoa
- Location within Innlandet Location within Norway
- Coordinates: 61.679°N 9.54994°E
- Country: Norway
- Region: Eastern Norway
- County: Innlandet
- District: Gudbrandsdalen
- Municipality: Sel Municipality
- Elevation: 315 m (1,033 ft)
- Time zone: UTC+01:00 (CET)
  - Summer (DST): UTC+02:00 (CEST)
- Post Code: 2670 Otta

Sjoa is a village in Sel Municipality in Innlandet county, Norway. The village is located at the confluence of the rivers Gudbrandsdalslågen and Sjoa. The Dovrebanen railway line and the European route E6 highway both run through the village. Sjoa Chapel is located in the village as well as the mountain Saukampen which lies just to the southwest of the village.

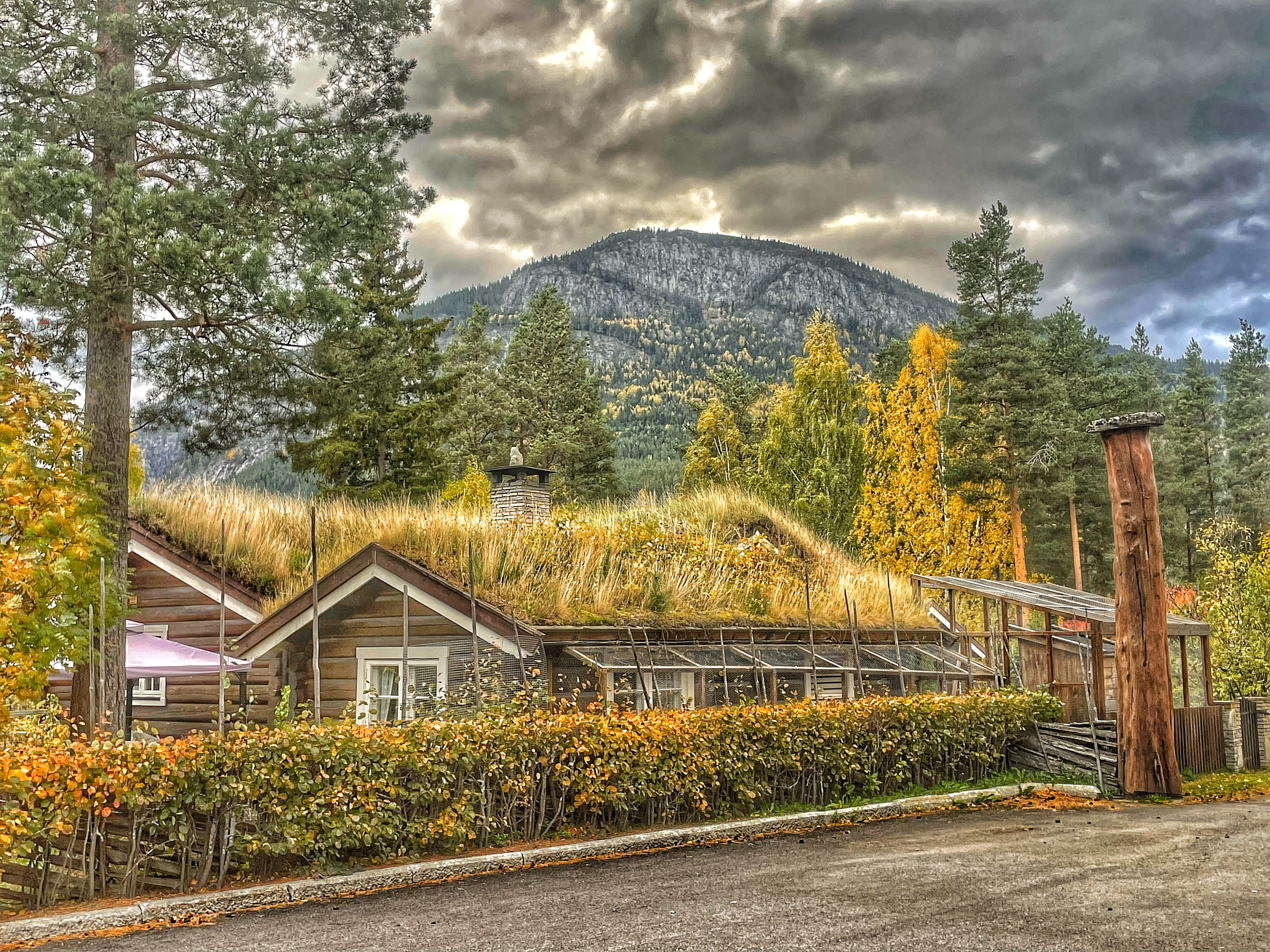
Sjoa in autumn.

== History ==
In 2016, the Perkolo Bridge, a glued laminated timber bridge over the Gudbrandsdalslågen river at Sjoa, collapsed. The official report into the collapse determined that "the direct cause is a defective joint in the framework." The Perkolo Bridge collapse led to 11 similar bridges being closed for inspection, including one at Tretten. A similar bridge over the Gudbrandsdalslågen river at Tretten collapsed in 2022, despite it having been checked for defects in 2021.

=== Name ===
The village is named after the river Sjoa. Prior to 1965, the village was part of Nord-Fron Municipality, but in a large municipal merger on 1 January 1965, the Sjoa area became part of a newly enlarged Sel Municipality.
