= Høvringen =

Village in Sel Municipality, Norway

- Village
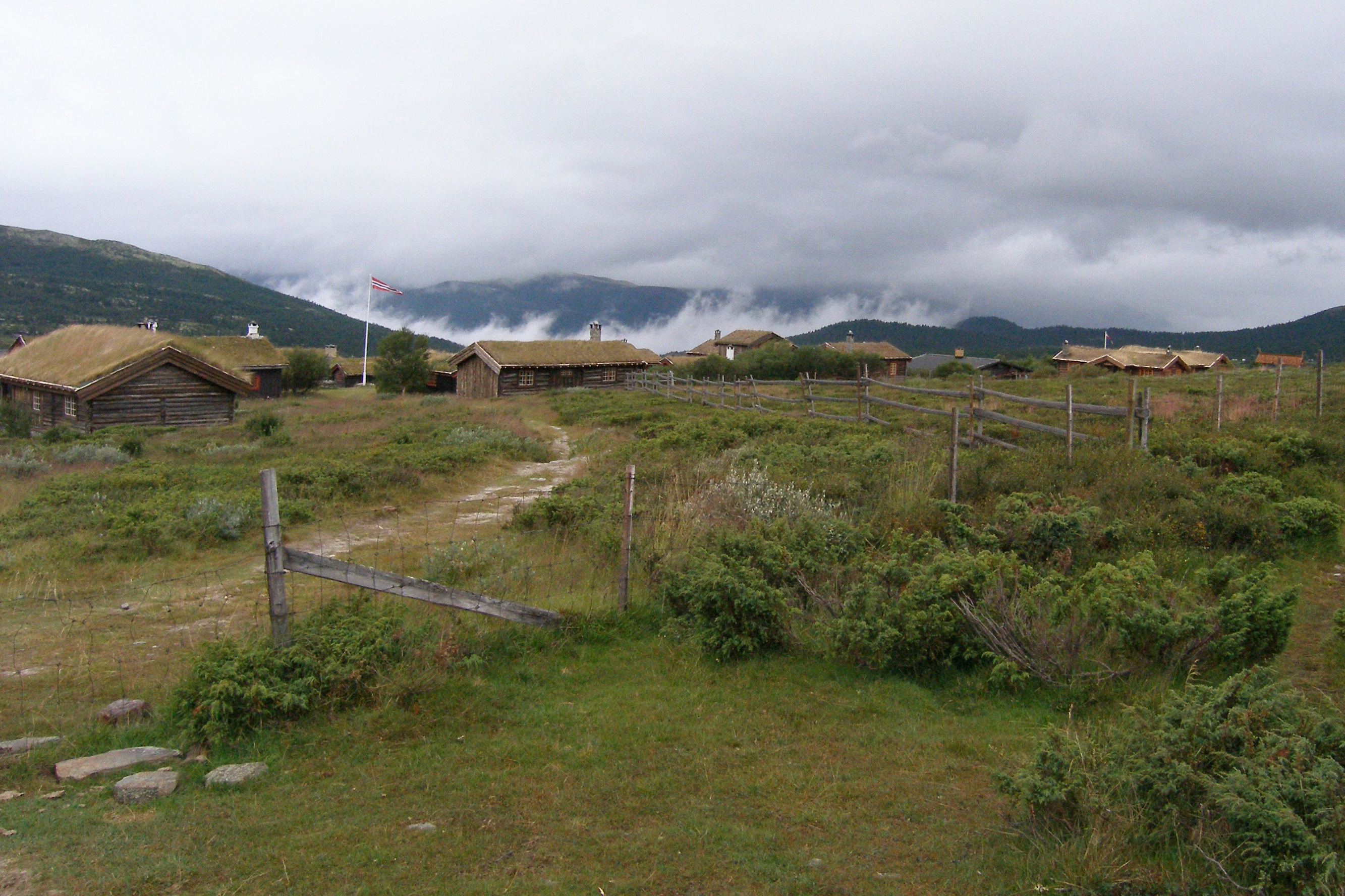
- View of the Brekkeseter area in the village
- Interactive map of Høvringen
- Location within Innlandet Location within Norway
- Coordinates: 61.8968°N 9.47695°E
- Country: Norway
- Region: Eastern Norway
- County: Innlandet
- District: Gudbrandsdalen
- Municipality: Sel Municipality
- Elevation: 987 m (3,238 ft)
- Time zone: UTC+01:00 (CET)
  - Summer (DST): UTC+02:00 (CEST)
- Post Code: 2673 Høvringen

Høvringen is a village in Sel Municipality in Innlandet county, Norway. The village is located in the northern part of the municipality, high up in the mountains along the Gudbrandsdalen valley. The village area sits at an elevation of about 1,000 metres (3,300 ft) above sea level. The village area now serves as the main entrance into the mountainous Rondane National Park, the first national park that was established in Norway.

== History ==
Originally, Høvringen was filled with small, summer mountain pastures (Norwegian: seter) that were used by farmers from the villages down in the valley. The first tourists came to Høvringen as early as the 1880s. The national park at Rondane was established in 1962, which brought a lot more tourists to the area. As the area transitioned from a farming area into a modern tourist resort, the area's animal life has remained rich and high standards and good service are combined with the preservation of the culture and traditions of the old seter farms.

== Tourism ==
The culture and traditions of the old mountain pasture community are still well preserved, and today Høvringen has lodging accommodations for about 1000 guests including everything from simple self-catering cabins and a mountain school camp to several mountain lodges and hotels. In addition, there are over 200 privately owned cottages that have been built in the area.

Høvringen and its surrounding area has about 120 kilometres (75 mi) of prepared cross-country skiing tracks and 50 kilometres (31 mi) of marked tracks within Rondane National Park. The marked summer hiking trails expands for more than 150 kilometres (93 mi) both within and outside Rondane National Park.

== Culture ==
Høvringen and Rondane have left their mark in Norwegian cultural history. On his journey through the Gudbrandsdal valley, Peter Christen Asbjørnsen, well known for his compilations of old Norwegian legends and fairy-tales, stayed in Høvringen in 1842. His stay formed the basis for the story of a local legend, Per Gynt, who came upon trolls and terrifying monsters in Rondane. Asbjørnsen's fairy-tale "Reindeer hunt" at Rondane 20 years later created the basis for Henrik Ibsen's drama Peer Gynt.

In "The Bridal Wreath", the first part of Sigrid Undset's trilogy Kristin Lavransdatter, the young protagonist, Kristin, is allowed to accompany her father up into the mountains. Here, she describes Høvringen and Rondane with an atmosphere of great legend and superstition.

Kristin gazed with great eyes–never before had she dreamed that the world was so big and wide. Forest-shagged ranges lay below her on all sides; the valley was but a cleft betwixt the huge fells, and the side-glens still lesser clefts; there were many such, yet was there little of dale and much of fell. All around grey peaks, flaming with golden lichen, rose above the sea of forest, and far off, on the very brink of heaven, stood blue crests flashing here and there with snow, and melting, before their eyes, into the grey-blue and pure white summer clouds. But north-eastwards, nearer by–just beyond the sæter woods–lay a cluster of mighty slate-coloured domes with streaks of new-fallen snow down their slopes.

— Sigrid Undset, "The Bridal Wreath", Kristin Lavransdatter (1920)

Writer Aasmund Olavsson Vinje gave Rondane a central position in his poetic travelogue "Ferdaminne". His poem Ved Rondane was later set to music by Edvard Grieg, who also wrote music for Ibsen's play. Painters Erik Werenskiold, Hans Gude and not least Harald Solberg have all found motives in Rondane for their works. Solberg's A winter's night in Rondane has been voted the national painting of Norway.
