= Dale, Sel =

Village in Sel Municipality, Norway

Dale
- Village
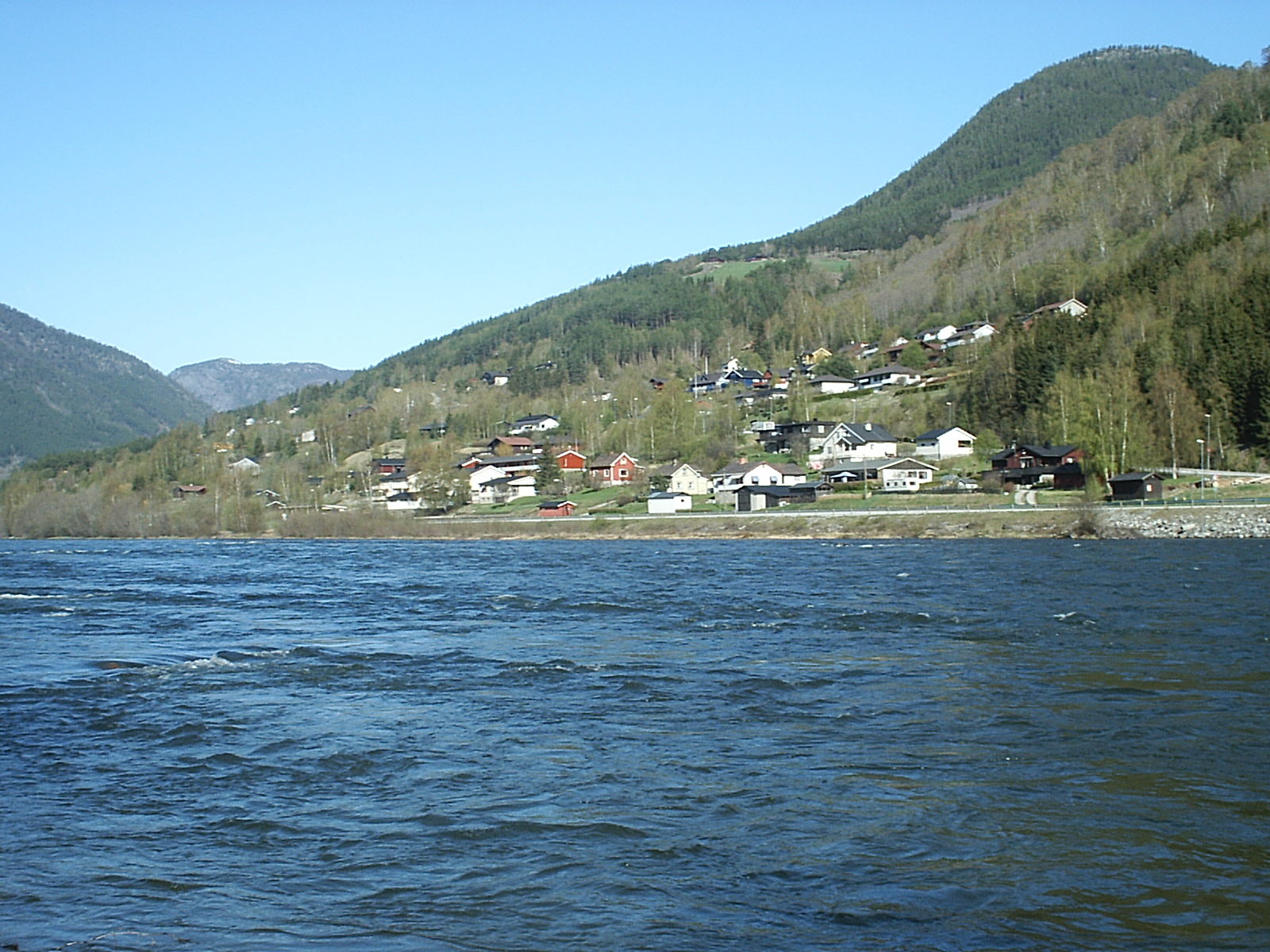
- View of the village from the south bank of the river, facing north.
- Interactive map of Dale
- Location within Innlandet Location within Norway
- Coordinates: 61.77534°N 9.49454°E
- Country: Norway
- Region: Eastern Norway
- County: Innlandet
- District: Gudbrandsdalen
- Municipality: Sel Municipality

Area
  - Total: 0.58 km^{2} (0.22 sq mi)
- Elevation: 328 m (1,076 ft)

Population (2020)
  - Total: 660
  - Density: 1,100/km^{2} (2,900/sq mi)
- Time zone: UTC+01:00 (CET)
  - Summer (DST): UTC+02:00 (CEST)
- Post Code: 2670 Otta

Dale is a village in Sel Municipality in Innlandet county, Norway. The village is located about 3 kilometres (1.9 mi) west of the town of Otta. The village is located along the Otta River. The Norwegian National Road 15 runs through the village.

The 0.58-square-kilometre (140-acre) village had a population (2020) of 660 and a population density of 1,138 inhabitants per square kilometre (2,950/sq mi). Since 2020, the population and area data for this village area has not been separately tracked by Statistics Norway and it has been considered part of the urban area of the town of Otta.
