= Nord-Sel =

Village in Sel Municipality, Norway

Sel Nord-Sel
- Village
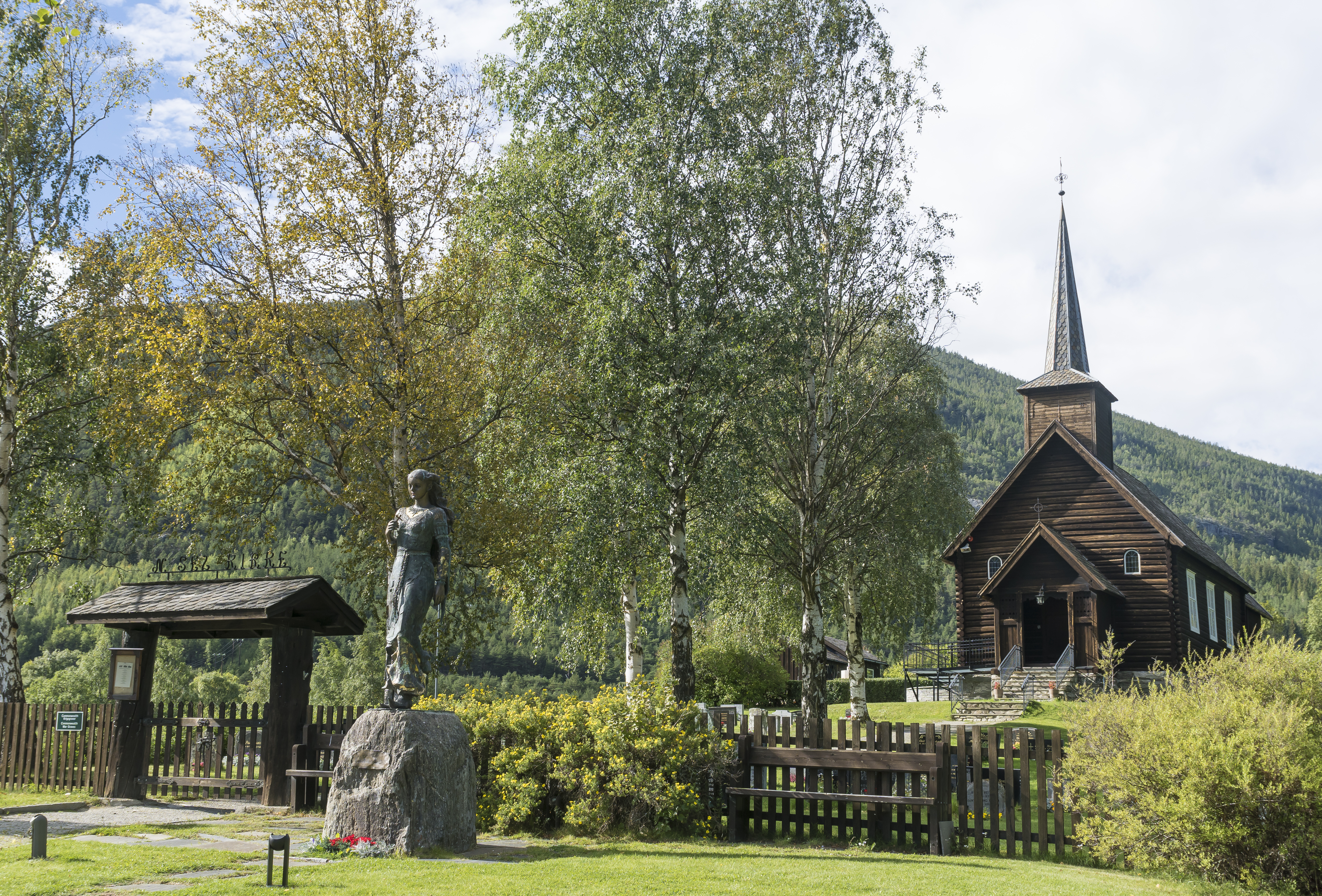
- View of the village church
- Interactive map of Sel; Nord-Sel
- Location within Innlandet Location within Norway
- Coordinates: 61.84112°N 9.40888°E
- Country: Norway
- Region: Eastern Norway
- County: Innlandet
- District: Gudbrandsdalen
- Municipality: Sel Municipality

Area
  - Total: 0.57 km^{2} (0.22 sq mi)
- Elevation: 304 m (997 ft)

Population (2016)
  - Total: 437
  - Density: 770/km^{2} (2,000/sq mi)
- Time zone: UTC+01:00 (CET)
  - Summer (DST): UTC+02:00 (CEST)
- Post Code: 2672 Sel

Sel or Nord-Sel is a village in Sel Municipality in Innlandet county, Norway. The village is located in the northern part of the municipality on the south shore of the Gudbrandsdalslågen river, about 12 kilometres (7.5 mi) northwest of the town of Otta. The European route E6 highway runs past the village on the opposite side of the river, and there is a short bridge connecting the village to this highway. The Nord-Sel Church is located in the village, right along the river.

The 0.57-square-kilometre (140-acre) village had a population (2016) of 437 and a population density of 767 inhabitants per square kilometre (1,990/sq mi). Since 2016, the population and area data for this village area has not been separately tracked by Statistics Norway.
