= Skogbygda, Sel =

Village in Sel Municipality, Norway

Skogbygda
- Village
- Interactive map of Skogbygda
- Location within Innlandet Location within Norway
- Coordinates: 61°45′06″N 9°14′12″E
- Country: Norway
- Region: Eastern Norway
- County: Innlandet
- District: Gudbrandsdalen
- Municipality: Sel Municipality
- Elevation: 664 m (2,178 ft)
- Time zone: UTC+01:00 (CET)
  - Summer (DST): UTC+02:00 (CEST)
- Post Code: 2676 Heidal

Skogbygda is a village in Sel Municipality in Innlandet county, Norway. The village is located in the Heidal valley, about 7 kilometres (4.3 mi) southwest of the village of Bjølstadmo. The rural farming village area is predominantly agricultural, counting a few dozen farms, the main ones being Steine (cadastral number 176), Brenna (177), Holen (178), Kagrud (179) and Åseng (180).
