= Gausdal Municipality =

Municipality in Innlandet, Norway

Gausdal Municipality Gausdal kommune
- Municipality
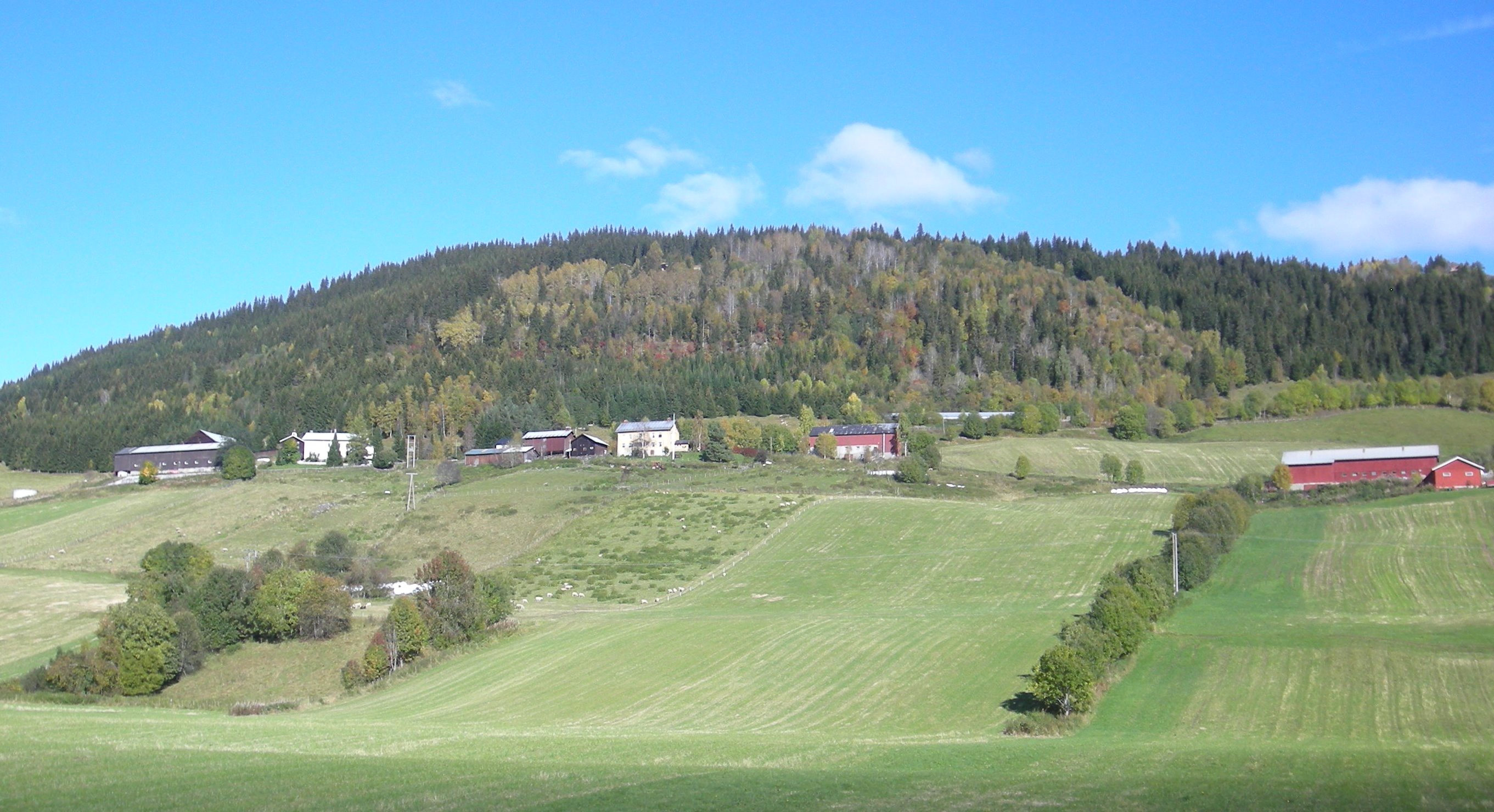
- View of the Aulstad Church area in Gausdal

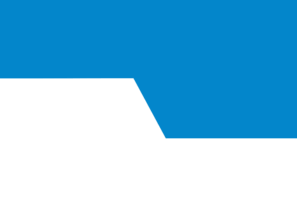
- Flag Coat of arms

- Innlandet within Norway

- Gausdal within Innlandet
- Coordinates: 61°16′36″N 9°55′21″E
- Country: Norway
- County: Innlandet
- District: Gudbrandsdal
- Established: 1 Jan 1838
  - Created as: Formannskapsdistrikt
- Disestablished: 1879
  - Succeeded by: Vestre Gausdal and Østre Gausdal
- Re-established: 1 Jan 1962
  - Preceded by: Vestre Gausdal and Østre Gausdal
- Administrative centre: Segalstad bru

Government
  - Mayor (2023): Anette Musdalslien (Sp)

Area
  - Total: 1,191.15 km^{2} (459.91 sq mi)
  - Land: 1,146.41 km^{2} (442.63 sq mi)
  - Water: 44.74 km^{2} (17.27 sq mi) 3.8%
  - Rank: #91 in Norway
- Highest elevation: 1,552.51 m (5,093.5 ft)

Population (2025)
  - Total: 6,174
  - Rank: #156 in Norway
  - Density: 5.2/km^{2} (13/sq mi)
  - Change (10 years): ▼ −1%
- Demonym: Gausdøl

Official language
  - Norwegian form: Neutral
- Time zone: UTC+01:00 (CET)
  - Summer (DST): UTC+02:00 (CEST)
- ISO 3166 code: NO-3441
- Website: Official website

Gausdal is a municipality in Innlandet county, Norway. It is located in the traditional district of Gudbrandsdal. The administrative centre of the municipality is the village of Segalstad bru. Other villages in Gausdal include Follebu, Forset, and Svingvoll.

The 1,191-square-kilometre (460 sq mi) municipality is the 91st largest by area out of the 357 municipalities in Norway. Gausdal Municipality is the 156th most populous municipality in Norway with a population of 6,174. The municipality's population density is 5.2 inhabitants per square kilometre (13/sq mi) and its population has decreased by 1% over the previous 10-year period.

Logging, farming, and tourism are important industries in the municipality.

== General information ==
The parish of Gausdal was established as a civil municipality on 1 January 1838, under the formannskapsdistrikt law. On 1 January 1867, a small area of the neighbouring Øyer Municipality, with a population of 40, was transferred to Gausdal Municipality. In 1879, Gausdal Municipality was divided into two municipalities: Vestre Gausdal Municipality in the northwest, with 2,362 inhabitants, and Østre Gausdal Municipality in the southeast, with 5,911 inhabitants. On 27 July 1956, a small area of Sør-Fron Municipality, with seven residents, was transferred to the neighbouring Vestre Gausdal Municipality.

During the 1960s, many municipal mergers took place across Norway as a result of the work of the Schei Committee. On 1 January 1962, Vestre Gausdal Municipality, with a population of 2,590, and Østre Gausdal Municipality, with a population of 3,942, were merged to re-establish Gausdal Municipality. The new municipality broadly corresponded to the Gausdal Municipality that had existed from 1838 to 1879, although the borders were not identical.

Historically, the municipality was part of the former Oppland county. On 1 January 2020, Gausdal became part of the newly created Innlandet county, formed by the merger of Hedmark and Oppland.

=== Name ===
The municipality, originally the parish, is named after the Gausdalen valley, recorded in Old Norse as Gausdalr, since the municipality lies in the valley. The first element comes from the river Gausa, which flows through the valley. The river name is derived from the verb gjósa, meaning "to gush", "burst out" or "stream forcefully". The final element is dalr, meaning "valley" or "dale".

=== Coat of arms ===
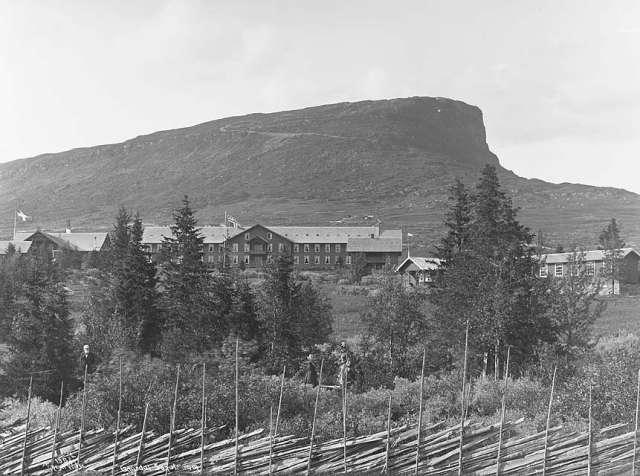
Skeikampen mountain – the outline is the inspiration for the municipal arms.

The coat of arms was granted on 19 September 1986. The official blazon is "Per fess azure and argent, a single stair step section slanting outwards" (Norwegian: Delt av blått og sølv ved enkelt trappesnitt skrått utover). This means that the arms are divided horizontally by a stepped line slanting to the right. The field, or background, above the line has a blue tincture. Below the line, the field has a tincture of argent, which is usually shown as white, or as silver when metal is used.

The design was made to resemble the outline of Skeikampen, one of the main mountains in the municipality. The argent lower part represents the snow-covered mountain, while the blue upper part represents the sky. The arms were designed by Inger Line Thallaug. The municipal flag has the same design as the coat of arms.

=== Churches ===
The Church of Norway has five parishes, or sokn, within Gausdal Municipality. They are part of the Sør-Gudbrandsdal prosti, or deanery, in the Diocese of Hamar.

Churches in Gausdal Municipality
Parish (sokn)	Church name	Location of the church	Year built
Aulstad	Aulstad Church	Aulstad	1864
Follebu	Follebu Church	Follebu	1260
Svatsum	Svatsum Church	Svatsum	1860
Vestre Gausdal	Vestre Gausdal Church	Forset	1784
Østre Gausdal	Østre Gausdal Church	Prestmoen (north of Segalstad bru)	c. 1250

== History ==
Number of minorities (1st and 2nd generation) in Gausdal by country of origin in 2017
Ancestry	Number
Poland	84
Denmark	42
Lithuania	36
Germany	27
Thailand	24
Somalia	23
Sweden	16

The old Follebu Church was built of stone in the early Middle Ages (around 1250). It is unusual in that the chancel and nave were built as one continuous piece.

In the 1880s, there was mining for nickel in the Espedalen valley in the northwest part of the municipality. The search for nickel was taken up again in 2004 by Blackstone Venture, a Canadian company. As of 2006, they are still drilling for mineral samples only.

== Geography ==
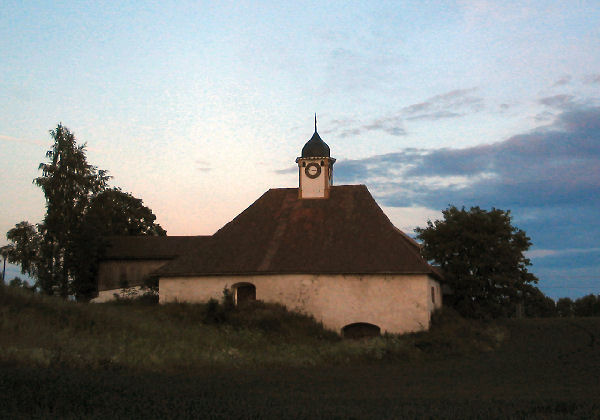
An old barn at Torshov farm in the nearby Vang Municipality (to the west). Gausdal resident Abraham Pihl was the architect.

Gausdal is bordered on the northwest by Sør-Fron Municipality, on the northeast by Ringebu Municipality and Øyer Municipality, on the southeast by Lillehammer Municipality, on the south by Nordre Land Municipality, and on the southwest by Nord-Aurdal Municipality and Øystre Slidre Municipality.

Western tributaries of the Gudbrandsdalslågen river include the Gausa River, which flows through Gausdalen valley. The lake Dokkfløyvatn is located in the municipality. The highest point in the municipality is the 1,552.51-metre (5,093.5 ft) tall mountain Nordre Langsua, on the border with Sør-Fron Municipality.

The famous Peer Gynt mountain road begins here and leads to the town of Vinstra. A popular ski area is located on the south slope of Skeikampen mountain. Langsua National Park, partially lies within the municipality.

== Government ==
Gausdal Municipality is responsible for primary education (through 10th grade), outpatient health services, senior citizen services, welfare and other social services, zoning, economic development, and municipal roads and utilities. The municipality is governed by a municipal council of directly elected representatives. The mayor is indirectly elected by a vote of the municipal council. The municipality is under the jurisdiction of the Gudbrandsdal District Court and the Eidsivating Court of Appeal.

=== Municipal council ===
The municipal council (Kommunestyre) of Gausdal Municipality is made up of 23 representatives that are elected to four year terms. The tables below show the current and historical composition of the council by political party.

Gausdal kommunestyre 2023–2027
Party name (in Norwegian)	Number of representatives
Labour Party (Arbeiderpartiet)	5
Green Party (Miljøpartiet De Grønne)	1
Centre Party (Senterpartiet)	8
Liberal Party (Venstre)	1
Joint list of the Conservative Party (Høyre) and the Progress Party (Fremskrittspartiet)	3
Local list in Gausdal (Bygdalista i Gausdal)	5
Total number of members:	23

Gausdal kommunestyre 2019–2023
Party name (in Norwegian)	Number of representatives
Labour Party (Arbeiderpartiet)	9
Green Party (Miljøpartiet De Grønne)	1
Centre Party (Senterpartiet)	10
Joint list of the Conservative Party (Høyre), Liberal Party (Venstre), and Progress Party (Fremskrittspartiet)	1
Local list in Gausdal (Bygdalista i Gausdal)	2
Total number of members:	23

Gausdal kommunestyre 2015–2019
Party name (in Norwegian)	Number of representatives
Labour Party (Arbeiderpartiet)	10
Green Party (Miljøpartiet De Grønne)	1
Centre Party (Senterpartiet)	7
Liberal Party (Venstre)	1
Joint list of the Conservative Party (Høyre) and the Progress Party (Fremskrittspartiet)	2
Local list in Gausdal (Bygdalista i Gausdal)	2
Total number of members:	23

Gausdal kommunestyre 2011–2015
Party name (in Norwegian)	Number of representatives
Labour Party (Arbeiderpartiet)	9
Centre Party (Senterpartiet)	5
Liberal Party (Venstre)	3
Joint list of the Conservative Party (Høyre) and the Progress Party (Fremskrittspartiet)	2
Local list in Gausdal (Bygdalista i Gausdal)	4
Total number of members:	23

Gausdal kommunestyre 2007–2011
Party name (in Norwegian)	Number of representatives
Labour Party (Arbeiderpartiet)	6
Centre Party (Senterpartiet)	5
Socialist Left Party (Sosialistisk Venstreparti)	1
Liberal Party (Venstre)	2
Joint list of the Conservative Party (Høyre) and the Progress Party (Fremskrittspartiet)	3
Local list in Gausdal (Bygdalista i Gausdal)	6
Total number of members:	23

Gausdal kommunestyre 2003–2007
Party name (in Norwegian)	Number of representatives
Labour Party (Arbeiderpartiet)	9
Centre Party (Senterpartiet)	8
Liberal Party (Venstre)	1
Joint list of the Conservative Party (Høyre) and the Progress Party (Fremskrittspartiet)	3
Local list in Gausdal (Bygdalista i Gausdal)	2
Total number of members:	23

Gausdal kommunestyre 1999–2003
Party name (in Norwegian)	Number of representatives
Labour Party (Arbeiderpartiet)	12
Progress Party (Fremskrittspartiet)	2
Conservative Party (Høyre)	1
Christian Democratic Party (Kristelig Folkeparti)	1
Centre Party (Senterpartiet)	11
Socialist Left Party (Sosialistisk Venstreparti)	1
Liberal Party (Venstre)	1
Local list in Gausdal (Bygdalista i Gausdal)	4
Total number of members:	33

Gausdal kommunestyre 1995–1999
Party name (in Norwegian)	Number of representatives
Labour Party (Arbeiderpartiet)	14
Progress Party (Fremskrittspartiet)	1
Conservative Party (Høyre)	1
Christian Democratic Party (Kristelig Folkeparti)	1
Centre Party (Senterpartiet)	11
Socialist Left Party (Sosialistisk Venstreparti)	1
Liberal Party (Venstre)	1
Local list in Gausdal (Bygdalista i Gausdal)	3
Total number of members:	33

Gausdal kommunestyre 1991–1995
Party name (in Norwegian)	Number of representatives
Labour Party (Arbeiderpartiet)	15
Progress Party (Fremskrittspartiet)	1
Conservative Party (Høyre)	2
Christian Democratic Party (Kristelig Folkeparti)	1
Centre Party (Senterpartiet)	10
Socialist Left Party (Sosialistisk Venstreparti)	4
Total number of members:	33

Gausdal kommunestyre 1987–1991
Party name (in Norwegian)	Number of representatives
Labour Party (Arbeiderpartiet)	18
Progress Party (Fremskrittspartiet)	3
Conservative Party (Høyre)	2
Christian Democratic Party (Kristelig Folkeparti)	1
Centre Party (Senterpartiet)	6
Socialist Left Party (Sosialistisk Venstreparti)	2
Liberal Party (Venstre)	1
Total number of members:	33

Gausdal kommunestyre 1983–1987
Party name (in Norwegian)	Number of representatives
Labour Party (Arbeiderpartiet)	19
Progress Party (Fremskrittspartiet)	1
Conservative Party (Høyre)	2
Christian Democratic Party (Kristelig Folkeparti)	1
Centre Party (Senterpartiet)	7
Socialist Left Party (Sosialistisk Venstreparti)	2
Liberal Party (Venstre)	1
Total number of members:	33

Gausdal kommunestyre 1979–1983
Party name (in Norwegian)	Number of representatives
Labour Party (Arbeiderpartiet)	19
Progress Party (Fremskrittspartiet)	1
Conservative Party (Høyre)	2
Christian Democratic Party (Kristelig Folkeparti)	2
Centre Party (Senterpartiet)	7
Socialist Left Party (Sosialistisk Venstreparti)	1
Liberal Party (Venstre)	1
Total number of members:	33

Gausdal kommunestyre 1975–1979
Party name (in Norwegian)	Number of representatives
Labour Party (Arbeiderpartiet)	18
Conservative Party (Høyre)	1
Christian Democratic Party (Kristelig Folkeparti)	2
Centre Party (Senterpartiet)	9
Socialist Left Party (Sosialistisk Venstreparti)	2
Liberal Party (Venstre)	1
Total number of members:	33

Gausdal kommunestyre 1971–1975
Party name (in Norwegian)	Number of representatives
Labour Party (Arbeiderpartiet)	19
Conservative Party (Høyre)	1
Christian Democratic Party (Kristelig Folkeparti)	1
Centre Party (Senterpartiet)	9
Socialist People's Party (Sosialistisk Folkeparti)	2
Liberal Party (Venstre)	1
Total number of members:	33

Gausdal kommunestyre 1967–1971
Party name (in Norwegian)	Number of representatives
Labour Party (Arbeiderpartiet)	17
Centre Party (Senterpartiet)	10
Socialist People's Party (Sosialistisk Folkeparti)	2
Common List of small farmholders and Liberal Party (Småbrukere og Venstre)	4
Total number of members:	33

Gausdal kommunestyre 1963–1967
Party name (in Norwegian)	Number of representatives
Labour Party (Arbeiderpartiet)	17
Christian Democratic Party (Kristelig Folkeparti)	1
Centre Party (Senterpartiet)	9
Socialist People's Party (Sosialistisk Folkeparti)	1
Liberal Party (Venstre)	2
List of workers, fishermen, and small farmholders (Arbeidere, fiskere, småbrukere liste)	3
Total number of members:	33

Gausdal kommunestyre 1962–1963
Party name (in Norwegian)	Number of representatives
Labour Party (Arbeiderpartiet)	24
Centre Party (Senterpartiet)	12
Liberal Party (Venstre)	4
Local List(s) (Lokale lister)	2
Total number of members:	42
Note: On 1 January 1962, Vestre Gausdal Municipality and Østre Gausdal Municipality were merged to form the new Gausdal Municipality. The members of the old municipal councils that had been elected from 1960 to 1963 were combined to form the new council for Gausdal. This was a temporary measure until the next election.

=== Mayors ===
The mayor (Norwegian: ordfører) of Gausdal Municipality is the political leader of the municipality and the chairperson of the municipal council. Here is a list of people who have held this position (incomplete list):

- 1838–1839: Østen O. Ovren
- 1839–1840: Sven J. Waalen
- 1840–1845: Paul Nygaard
- 1846–1847: Erlend Midtvold
- 1848–1849: Simen O. Ovren
- 1850–1851: Christian Gundersen Fougner
- 1852–1855: John Svendsen Waalen
- 1856–1859: Christian Gundersen Fougner
- 1860–1863: John Svendsen Waalen
- 1864–1867: Per Bø
- 1869–1869: Christian Gundersen Fougner
- 1870–1871: John Svendsen Waalen
- 1872–1875: Christian Gundersen Fougner
- 1876–1878: John Svendsen Waalen
- (1879–1961: Gausdal Municipality did not exist)
- 1962–1971: Reidar Engjom (Ap)
- 1971–1975: Bjørn Midtlien (Ap)
- 1975–1983: Kristian Baukhol (Ap)
- 1983–1991: Nils Nygard (Ap)
- 1991–1993: Liv Røe Johnsen (SV)
- 1994–2001: Inger Enger (Sp)
- 2001–2007: Olav Olstad (Sp)
- 2007–2011: Mona B. Nicolaysen (Sp)
- 2011–2019: Hans Oddvar Høistad (Ap)
- 2019–present: Anette Musdalslien (Sp)

== Notable people ==
=== Public service ===
- Abraham Pihl (1756 in Gausdal – 1821), a clergyman, astronomer, and architect
- Hakon Adelsteen Sommerfeldt (1811 in Gausdal – 1888), a Norwegian naval officer and ship designer
- Sigurd Fougner (1879 in Østre Gausdal – 1959), a Norwegian Supreme Court judge
- Reidar Engjom, (Norwegian Wiki) (1907 in Gausdal - 1970), a Norwegian politician
- Amund O. Ringsrud (1854 in Gausdal - 1931 in Elk Point, South Dakota) business owner, first Secretary of State for South Dakota, member of United States Constitutional Convention of 1889, Republican candidate for governor of South Dakota in 1896 (barely defeated, with it requiring an official count of the ballots to decide the election)

=== The Arts ===
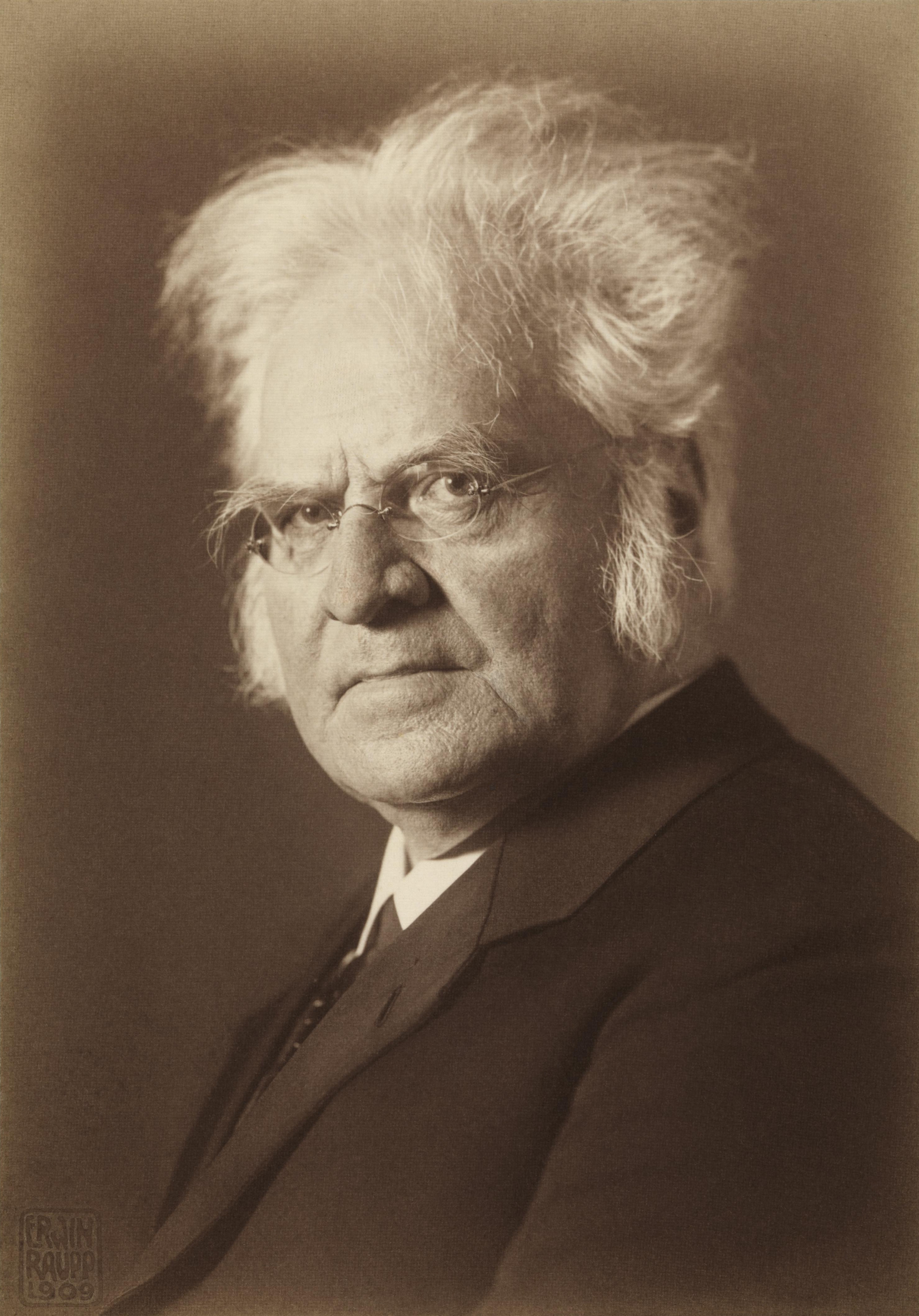
Bjørnstjerne Bjørnson, 1909

- Simen Fougner (1701 in Follebu – 1783), a farmer, poet, and non-fiction writer
- Bjørnstjerne Bjørnson (1832–1910), an author and Nobel Prize in Literature winner in 1903; lived in Aulestad in Follebu, 1874-1910
- Iver Holter (1850 in Gausdal – 1941), a composer and conductor of the Bergen Philharmonic Orchestra from 1882-1886
- Ole Amundsen Buslett (1855 in Gausdal – 1924), a Norwegian-American author, newspaperman, and politician
- Clara Tschudi (1856–1945), a writer who lived in Gausdal
- Hans Aanrud (1863–1953), a writer of plays, poetry, and stories of rural life in Gudbrandsdalen; raised in Auggedalen
- Inge Krokann (1893 – 1962 in Gausdal), a writer who wrote idiosyncratic nynorsk works
- Carl Gustav Sparre Olsen (1903–1984), a violinist and composer of Norwegian folk tunes; lived in Gausdal from 1947-1966
- Magne Elvestrand (1914 in Østre Gausdal – 1991), a pianist, harpsichordist, and organist
- Else Kveine, (Norwegian Wiki) (1933 in Gausdal - 2013), a poet

=== Sport ===
- Christen Smed, (Norwegian Wiki) (1797 in Gausdal - 1846), a mountaineer who climbed Romsdalshornet
- Mattis Stenshagen (born 1996 in Follebu), a cross-country skier

== Sister cities ==
Gausdal has sister city agreements with the following places:

- – Mora, Dalarna County, Sweden
