= Magne Elvestrand =

Norwegian musician (1914–1991)

Magne Elvestrand (February 17, 1914 – July 31, 1991) was a Norwegian pianist and harpsichordist, best known as an organist.

Elvestrand was born in Østre Gausdal Municipality. His father was an organist at Østre Gausdal Church and Follebu Church, and he allowed Magne to play there in 1927. Elvestrand studied organ under Arild Sandvold and Fartein Valen, who dedicated his opus 33 to him, and studied theory, harmony, and counterpoint under Gustav Fredrik Lange and Per Steenberg. At the age of 18 he was made cathedral organist at Oslo Cathedral while Eyvind Alnæs was ill and then continued in this function after Alnæs's death until Sandvold was appointed to the position. During the commemoration of the 200th anniversary of Bach's death in 1950, Elvestrand played all of Bach's works at Grefsen Church, where he was organist from 1940 to 1967. He debuted as a pianist in 1956, and he performed his first full harpsichord concert in Copenhagen in 1962. Elvestrand served as the organist at Trinity Church in Oslo from 1967 to 1984. As a teacher, he worked at the Oslo Conservatory of Music from 1942 to 1954 and from 1966 to 1973, at the Norwegian Academy of Music from 1973 to 1984, and at the Huseby public school for the blind from 1952 to 1975. He retired in 1981. Elvestrand's solo album was nominated for the 1977 Spelleman Awards in the classical/contemporary music category, but the award was won by Grex Vocalis. Elvestrand died in Germany.
