= Fougner =

Fougner is a surname. Notable people with the surname include:

- Brit Fougner (born 1946), Norwegian politician
- Christopher Simonsen Fougner (1795–1869), Norwegian politician
- Else Bugge Fougner (born 1944), Norwegian lawyer and politician
- G. Selmer Fougner (1885–1941), American wine and restaurant critic
- Gunnar Fougner (1911–1995), Norwegian architect
- Kristian Fougner (1919–2012), Norwegian engineer and resistance member
- Sigurd Fougner (1879–1959), Norwegian judge
- Simen Fougner (1701–1783), Norwegian farmer, poet and non-fiction writer
