= Svingvoll =

Village in Gausdal Municipality, Norway

- Village
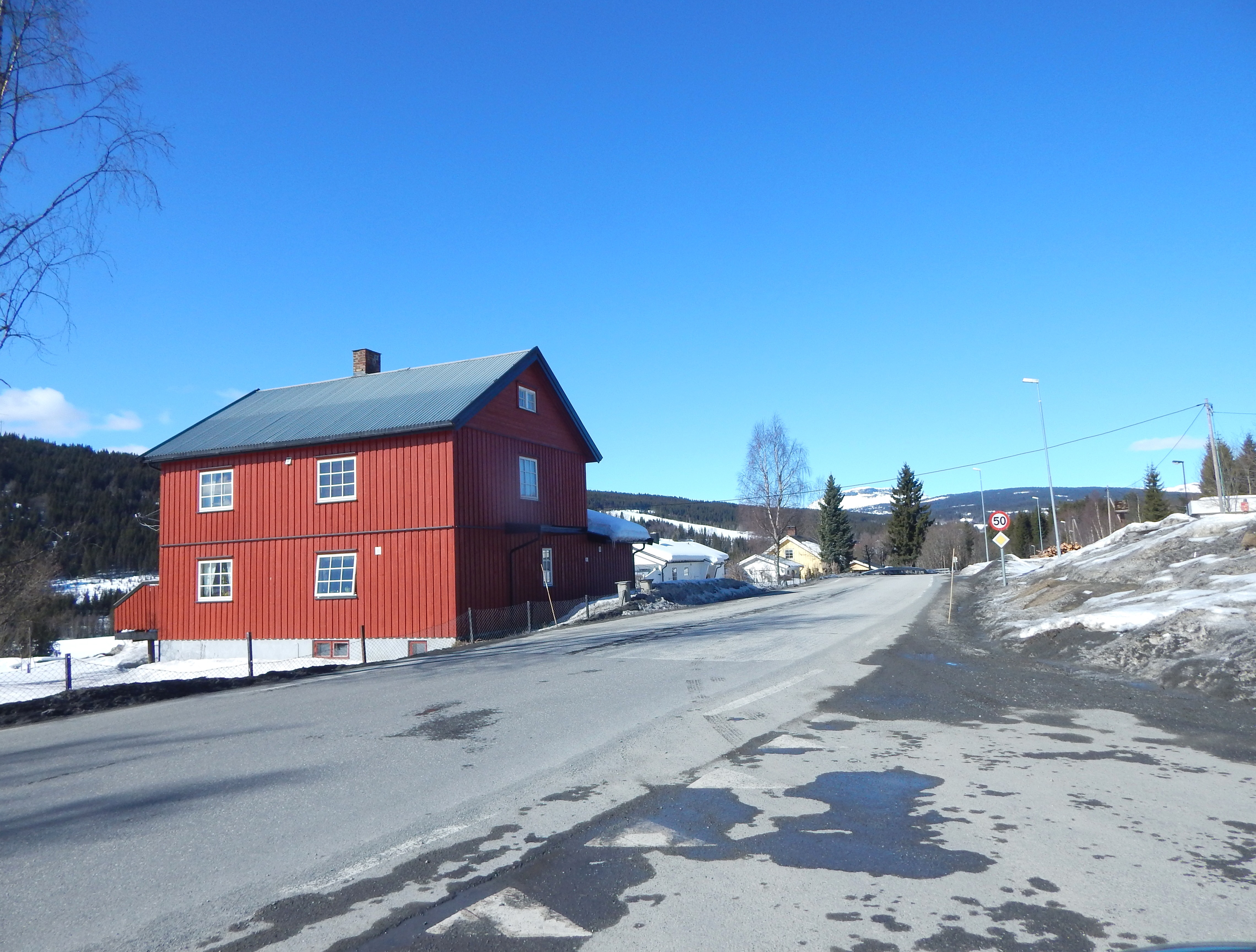
- View of the village
- Interactive map of Svingvoll
- Location within Innlandet Location within Norway
- Coordinates: 61.29541°N 10.18669°E
- Country: Norway
- Region: Eastern Norway
- County: Innlandet
- District: Gudbrandsdalen
- Municipality: Gausdal Municipality
- Elevation: 475 m (1,558 ft)
- Time zone: UTC+01:00 (CET)
  - Summer (DST): UTC+02:00 (CEST)
- Post Code: 2652 Svingvoll

Svingvoll is a village in Gausdal Municipality in Innlandet county, Norway. The village is located along the river Gausa, about 10 kilometres (6.2 mi) southeast of the Skeikampen alpine skiing centre and about 10 kilometres (6.2 mi) to the northwest of the village of Segalstad bru and about 7 kilometres (4.3 mi) to the west of the village of Tretten in the neighboring Øyer Municipality.
