= Trapping pit =

Trap consisting of a deep pit with vertical walls

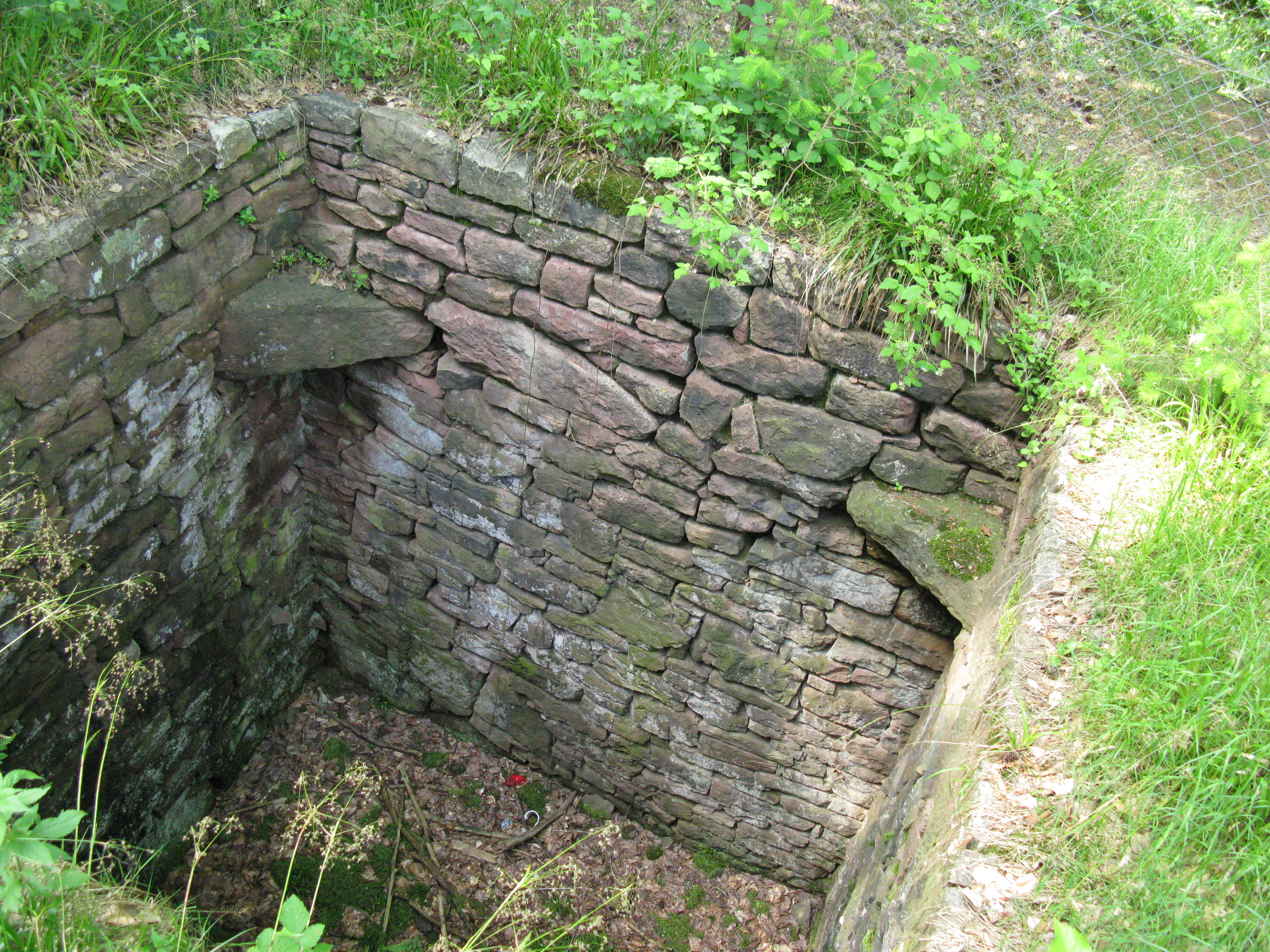
Pit for hunting wolves, near Hohenwart, Bavaria, Germany

Trapping pits are deep pits dug into the ground, or built from stone, in order to trap animals. European rock drawings and cave paintings reveal that bear, moose and wolf were hunted since the Stone Age using trapping pits. Remains of trapping pits used for hunting elk, reindeer, wolves, and bears can still be found in Northern Scandinavia. These pits, which can measure up to 4 by 7 metres (13 ft × 23 ft) in size and be up to several metres deep, were camouflaged with branches and leaves. They had steep sides lined with planks or masonry, making it impossible for the animal to escape once it had fallen in. When the animal had fallen into the pit, it was killed, either bled to death by sharpened sticks pointed upwards from the bottom of the pit, or in the case of pits without these sticks, dispatched by hunters waiting nearby. Some traps had a small rope enabling rodents and amphibians to escape.

== Pits for hunting elk (Alces alces) ==
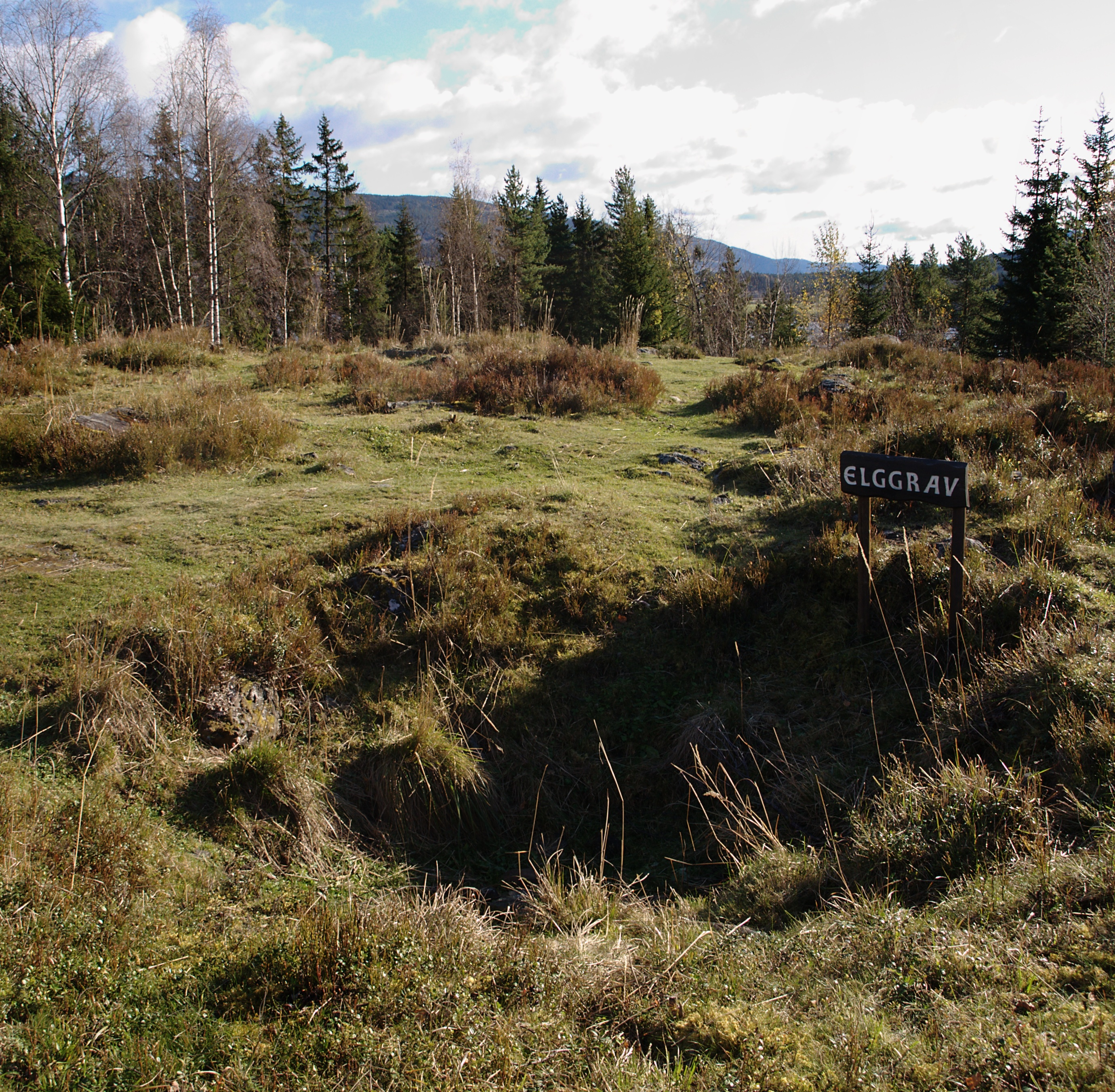
Remains of an elk pit at Storøya.

Pits for hunting Eurasian elk (moose) are normally found in large groups, crossing the elk's regular paths and stretching over a large landmass. Remains of wooden fences designed to guide the animals toward the pits have been found in bogs and peats.

In Norway two forms are found: a tapered construction with a timbered box at the bottom where the legs of the animal are locked, or a bigger one where the animal falls through a covered lid. The latter one will typically have a bowl form today, while the former most often lacks the timbered box. The tapered construction seems to be the most common one, especially in the mountains.

Early examples of these trapping devices have been excavated by archaeologists and older sites are questionably dated to around 3700 BC while one of the later ones in Lesja municipality in Gudbrandsdalen is dated to 1690. Another location Rødsmoen at Gråfjell was in use over a period of 2000 years, from older Bronze Age around 1800 BC to older Iron Age around 500-550 AD. From the excavations at Dokkfløy it seems that the hunting pits has been in use during two periods, an older period from around 500-300 BC, perhaps still in use around 1000 AD, and a later period up to about 1700 AD.

Trapping elk in pits is an extremely effective hunting method, and as early as the 16th century the Norwegian government tried to restrict their use and in 1860 the hunting method was banned by law. Nevertheless, the method was in use until the 20th century.

== Pits for hunting reindeer ==
Reindeer pits are almost exclusively found in the mountainous areas of Norway. They are stone built and are normally accompanied by leading fences or walls, also made from stone, which would have guided the animals towards the pits. The trapping pits are normally rectangular in shape and quite narrow, making it difficult for the animal to move once it had fallen in. In some areas one can also find bow rests – stone built hiding places for hunters equipped with a bow and arrows.

== Pits for trapping wolves ==
Wolf pits are deep pits, dug into soft soils, normally near farmland. The pit itself would have been covered by branches and baited with carrion such as a dead cow. The wolf would be attracted by the smell, fall in the pit and be unable to scale the steep sides; it could then be killed.

The military application of this was the trou de loup (wolf hole).

== Rhinoceros ==
The Manshu (Tang dynasty) states that rhinoceros were hunted in Yunnan using pit traps.

== See also ==
- Animal trapping
- Desert kite
- Pitfall trap
- Punji sticks
- Trou de loup
