= Forset =

Village in Gausdal Municipality, Norway

- Village
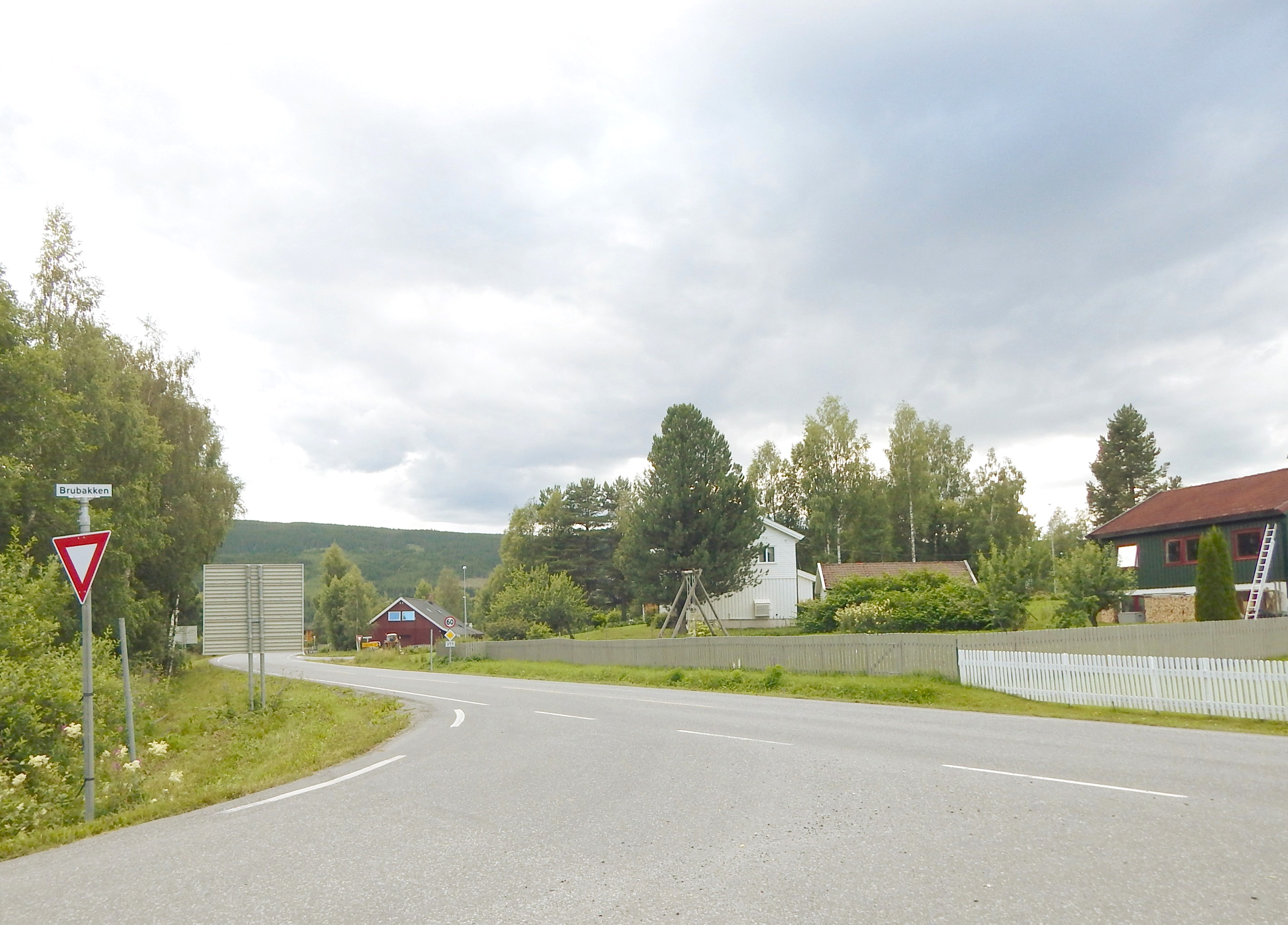
- View of the village
- Interactive map of Forset
- Location within Innlandet Location within Norway
- Coordinates: 61.20212°N 10.14384°E
- Country: Norway
- Region: Eastern Norway
- County: Innlandet
- District: Gudbrandsdal
- Municipality: Gausdal Municipality

Area
  - Total: 0.71 km^{2} (0.27 sq mi)
- Elevation: 339 m (1,112 ft)

Population (2024)
  - Total: 608
  - Density: 856/km^{2} (2,220/sq mi)
- Time zone: UTC+01:00 (CET)
  - Summer (DST): UTC+02:00 (CEST)
- Post Code: 2653 Vestre Gausdal

Forset is a village in Gausdal Municipality in Innlandet county, Norway. The village is located along the river Jøra, about 6 kilometres (3.7 mi) west of the villages of Follebu and Segalstad bru. Vestre Gausdal Church is located in the village.

The 0.71-square-kilometre (180-acre) village has a population (2024) of 608 and a population density of 856 inhabitants per square kilometre (2,220/sq mi).

== History ==
Forset was the administrative centre of the old Vestre Gausdal Municipality, which existed until 1962 when it became a part of Gausdal Municipality.
