= Dokkfløyvatnet =

Lake in Innlandet, Norway

Dokkfløyvatnet Dokkfløy
- Dokkfløyvatnet
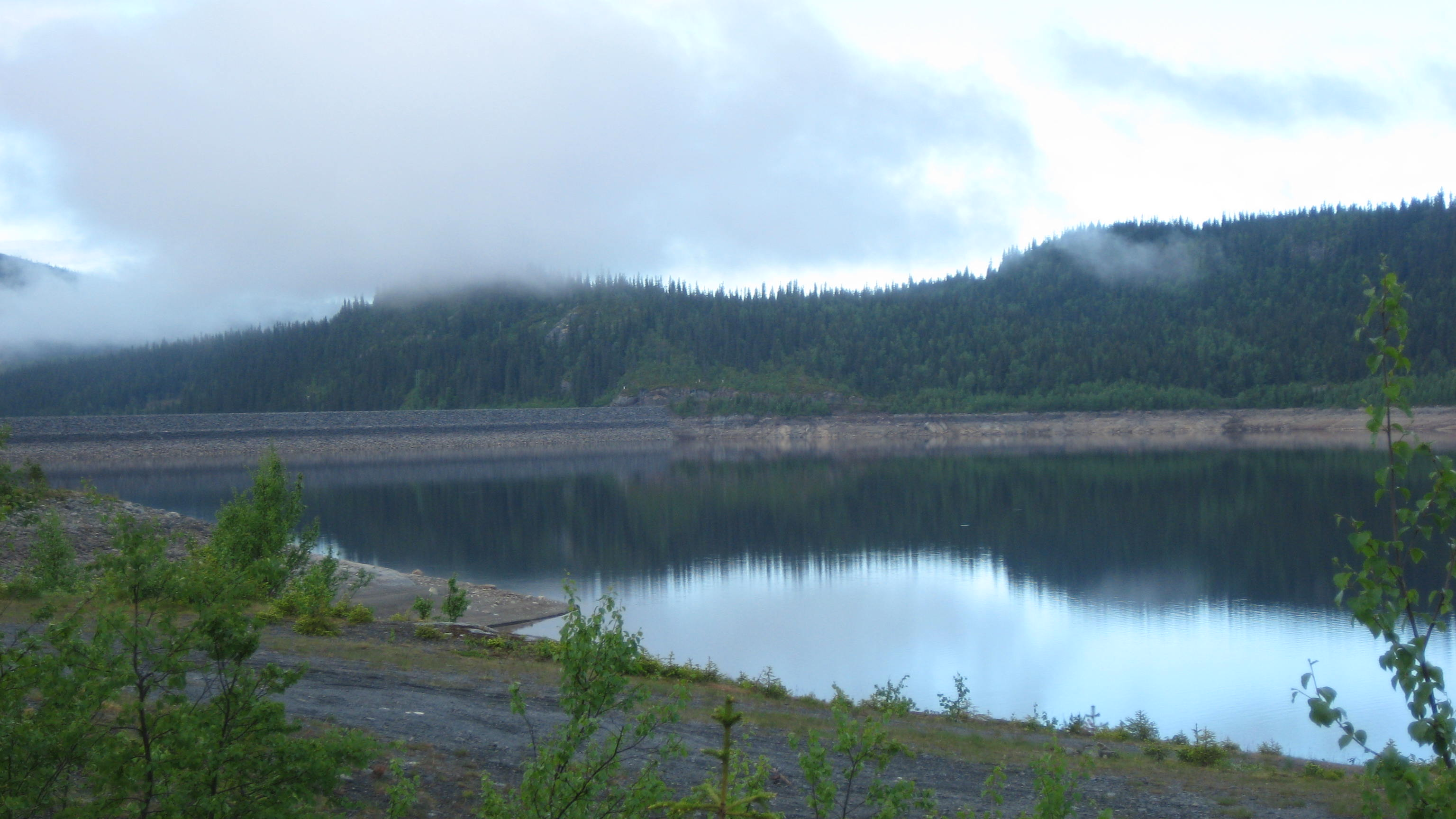
- View of the lake
- Interactive map of the lake
- Location: Nordre Land and Gausdal, Innlandet
- Coordinates: 61.14175°N 9.9658°E
- Primary inflows: Dokkaelva river
- Primary outflows: Dokka river
- Basin countries: Norway
- Max. length: 12.3 kilometres (7.6 mi)
- Max. width: 1.4 kilometres (0.87 mi)
- Surface area: 9.42 km^{2} (3.64 sq mi)
- Max. depth: 13.8 metres (45 ft)
- Surface elevation: 735 metres (2,411 ft)
- References: NVE

Dokkfløyvatnet or Dokkfløy is a lake which lies in Gausdal Municipality and Nordre Land Municipality in Innlandet county, Norway. The 9.42-square-kilometre (3.64 sq mi) lake is part of the river Dokka. When the Dokkfløy Dam was built on the river, the lake was created. The lake sits at an elevation of 735 metres (2,411 ft) above sea level. The water from the lake is piped through tunnels to the nearby hydroelectric power station. The lake is located about 11 kilometres (6.8 mi) to the southwest of the village of Forset and about 25 kilometres (16 mi) to the west of the town of Lillehammer.

There have been many archaeological discoveries made in the area. Prior to the damming of the river, archaeological investigations began in 1978. In the dam area alone, archaeologists found 121 moose traps, 90 iron mining facilities, and evidence of 68 Stone Age settlements. Using the C14 method, the oldest of these discoveries were dated to be over 9000 years old.

== See also ==
- List of lakes in Norway
