= Follebu Church =

Church in Innlandet, Norway

- Follebu kirke
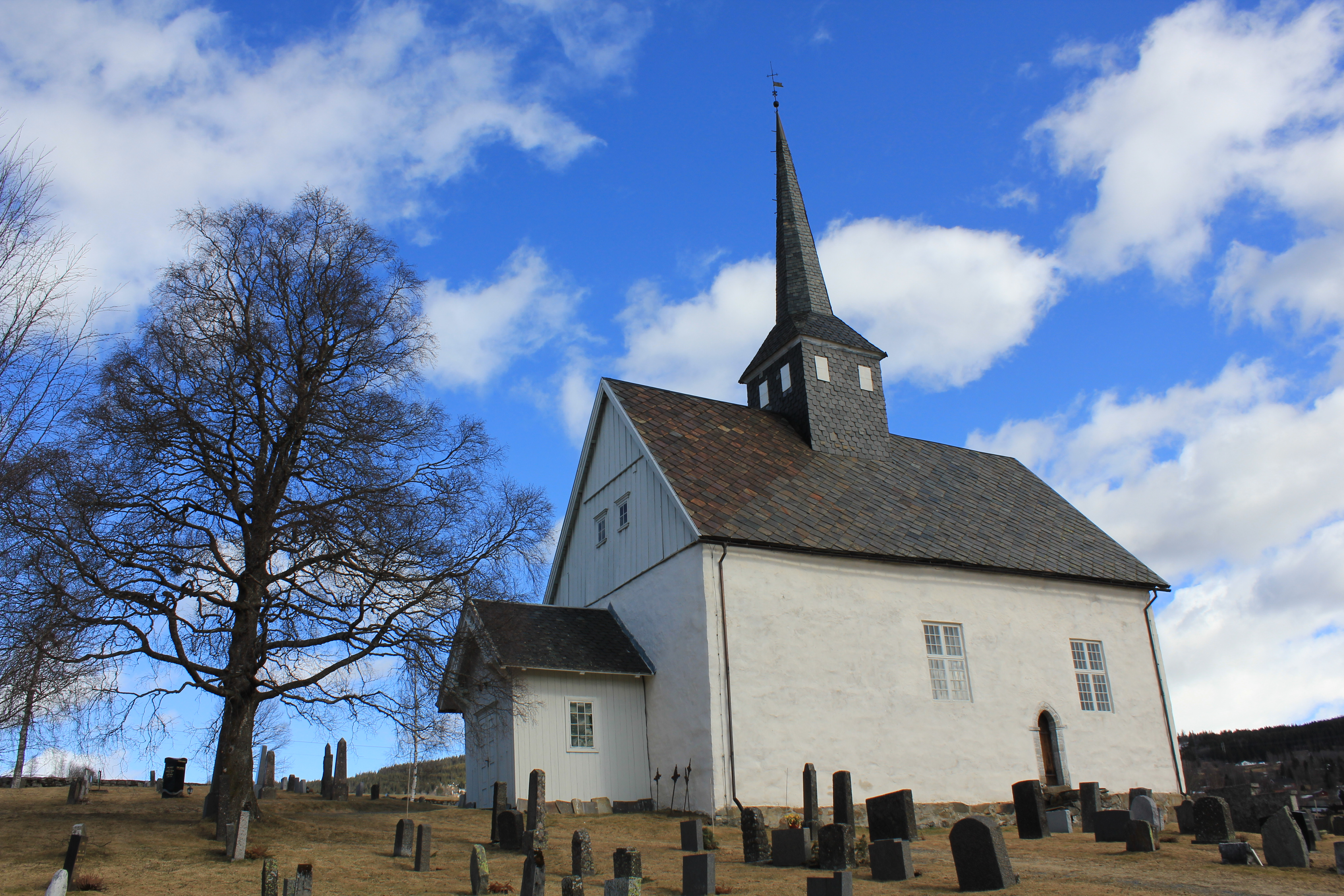
- View of the church
- Follebu Church
- 61°13′34″N 10°16′04″E
- Location: Gausdal Municipality, Innlandet
- Country: Norway
- Denomination: Church of Norway
- Previous denomination: Catholic Church
- Churchmanship: Evangelical Lutheran

History
- Status: Parish church
- Founded: 1260
- Consecrated: 1260

Architecture
- Functional status: Active
- Architectural type: Long church
- Completed: 1260 (766 years ago)

Specifications
- Capacity: 140
- Materials: Stone

Administration
- Diocese: Hamar bispedømme
- Deanery: Sør-Gudbrandsdal prosti
- Parish: Follebu
- Norwegian Cultural Heritage Site
- Type: Church
- Status: Automatically protected
- ID: 84178

Follebu Church (Norwegian: Follebu kirke) is a parish church of the Church of Norway in Gausdal Municipality in Innlandet county, Norway. It is located in the village of Follebu. It is the church for the Follebu parish which is part of the Sør-Gudbrandsdal prosti (deanery) in the Diocese of Hamar. The white, stone church was built in a long church design in 1260 using plans drawn up by an unknown architect. The church seats about 140 people.

The church can be reached via Norwegian County Road 2550 and Norwegian County Road 2530.

== History ==
The earliest existing historical records of the church date back to the year 1341, but the church was not new that year. The church in Follebu is a stone church that was built from 1260 to 1300. It is a rectangular Gothic structure. Stone churches in the Oppland region were quite rare in the middle ages, but Gausdal had two stone churches built in the 13th century and both have survived to this day. The church is not huge, but the walls are very thick: 1.75 metres (5 ft 9 in) in the west wall and approximately 1.55 metres (5 ft 1 in) in the other walls. This gives an interior floor area of about 14 by 7.65 metres (45.9 ft × 25.1 ft). The internal height along the wall is about 6.4 metres (21 ft). The altar and the pulpit have rich acanthus ornamentation created by Eistein Kjørn. There is a cemetery around the church. In 1686, a small sacristy was built just off the choir. In 1868, the old sacristy was torn down and a new, larger sacristy was built to replace it. In 1872, a church porch was built as the main entrance to the building.

== Media gallery ==
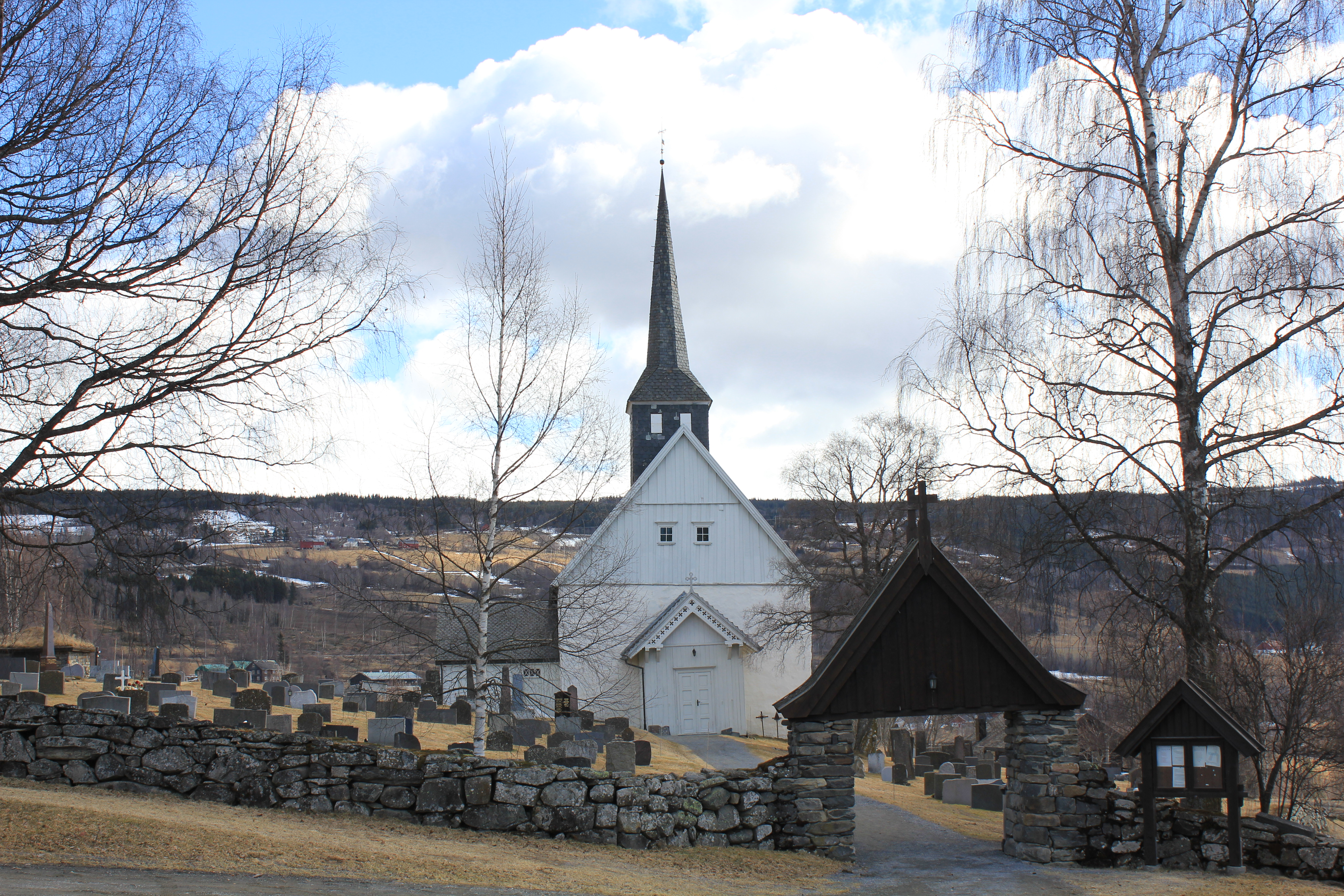

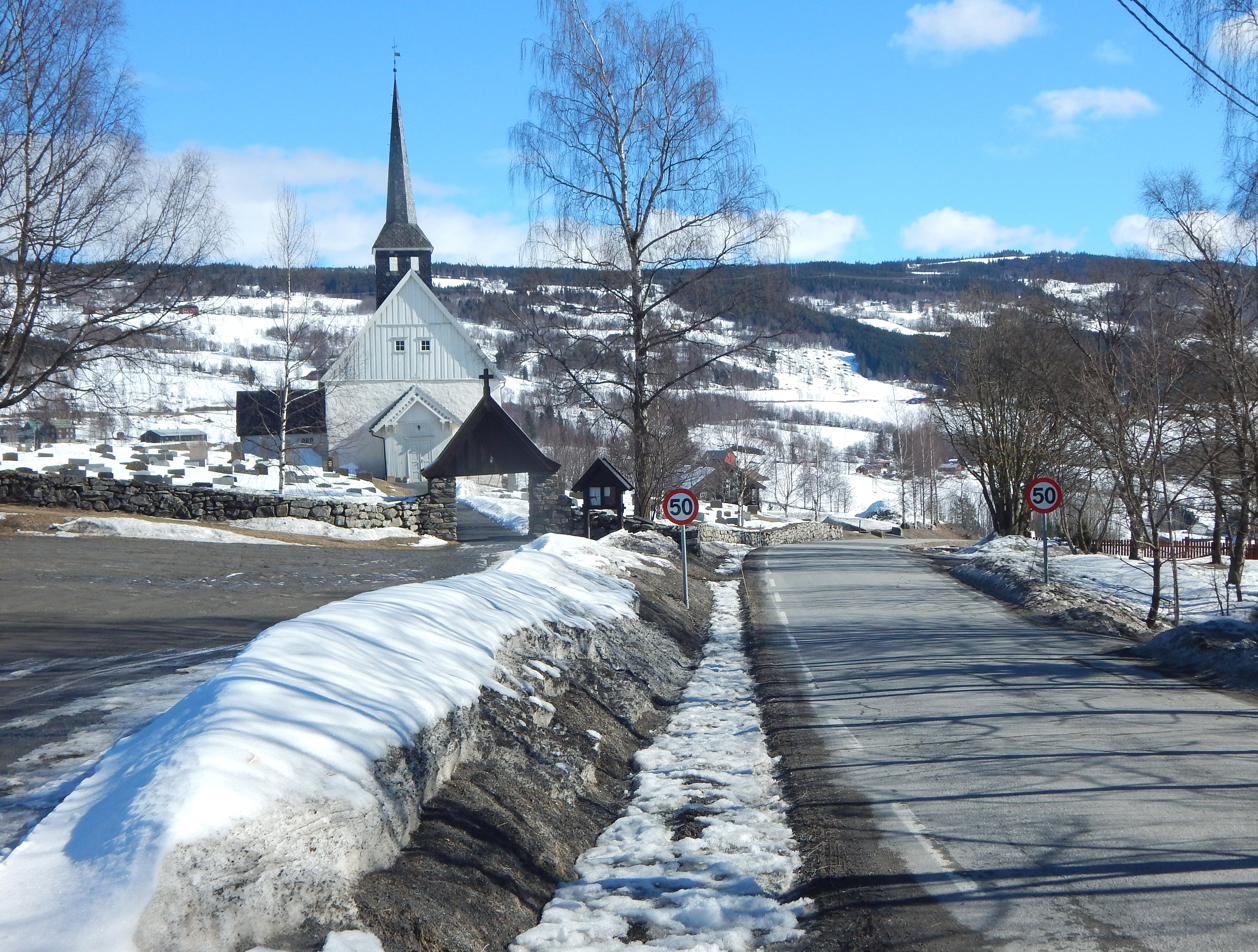

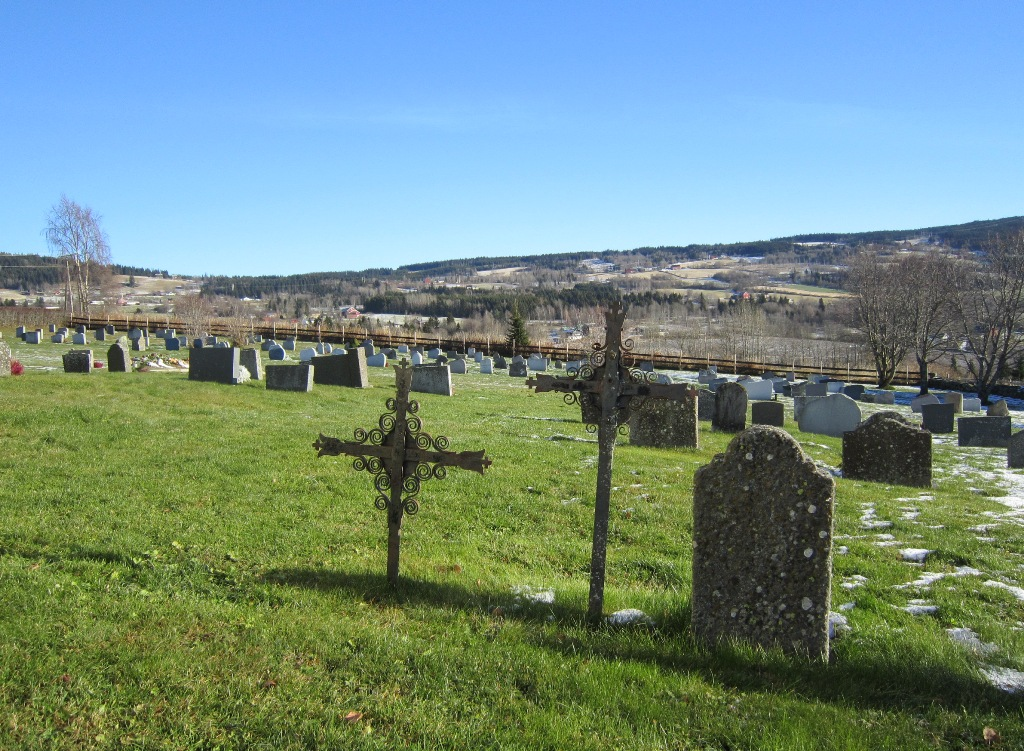

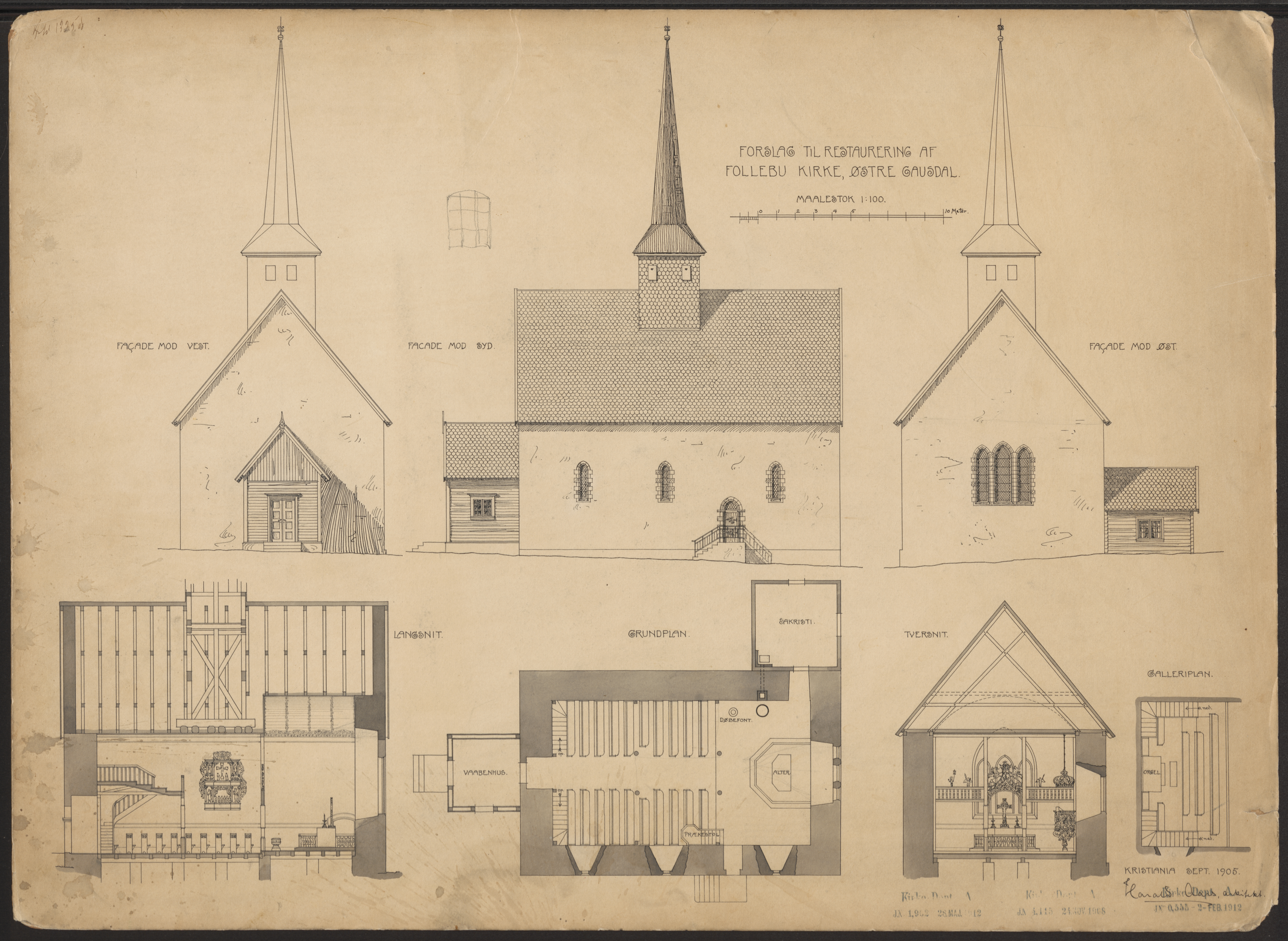

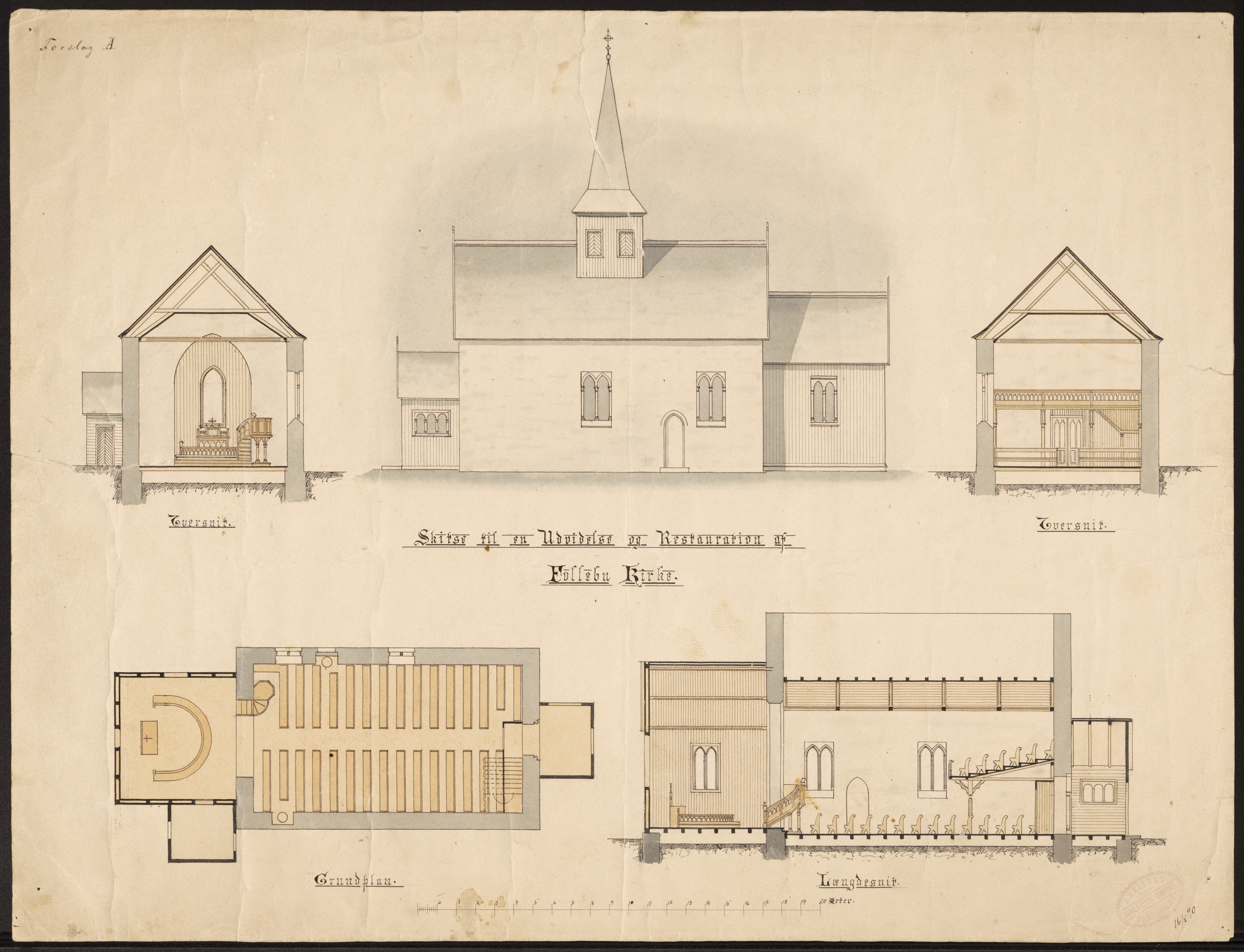

== Parish ==
The Follebu parish was incorporated into Gausdal Municipality on 1 January 1838 after the Formannskapsdistrikt law went into effect. Gausdal was divided into the separate Vestre Gausdal Municipality and Østre Gausdal Municipality in 1879, but they were reunited into one municipality in 1962. The database for Norske Gaardnavne Vol IV published in 1900 contains Gårdsnummer 1-32 for Follebu Parish in Østre Gausdal Municipality. The Matrikkelutkastet av 1950 lists Gårdsnummer 119-150 for Gausdal municipality because all of the Gårdsnummer in Østre Gausdal Municipality were increased by 118 to eliminate duplication with the Vestre Gausdal Gårdsnummer when the two municipalities were reunited.

The parish records start in 1693 for Gausdal Prestegjeld and in 1846 for Østre Gausdal Prestegjeld at Digitalarkivet. The attached KML file shows the church location and the farm locations in Gnr/Bnr format.

== See also ==
- List of churches in Hamar
