= Østre Gausdal Church =

Church in Innlandet, Norway

- Østre Gausdal kirke
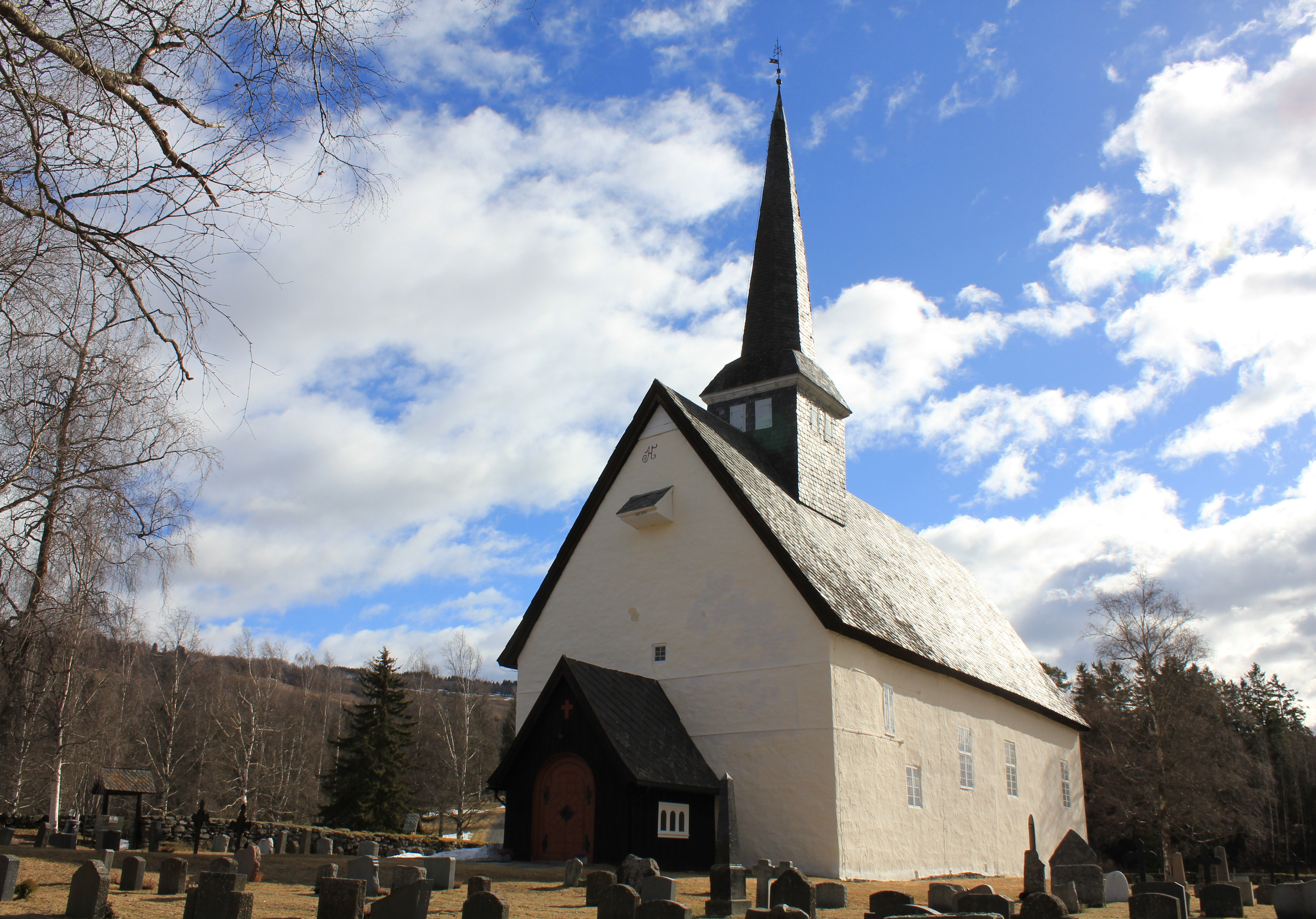
- View of the church
- Østre Gausdal Church
- 61°15′27″N 10°09′19″E
- Location: Gausdal Municipality, Innlandet
- Country: Norway
- Denomination: Church of Norway
- Previous denomination: Catholic Church
- Churchmanship: Evangelical Lutheran

History
- Status: Parish church
- Founded: c. 1250
- Consecrated: c. 1250

Architecture
- Functional status: Active
- Architectural type: Long church
- Completed: c. 1250 (776 years ago)

Specifications
- Capacity: 280
- Materials: Stone

Administration
- Diocese: Hamar bispedømme
- Deanery: Sør-Gudbrandsdal prosti
- Parish: Østre Gausdal
- Norwegian Cultural Heritage Site
- Type: Church
- Status: Automatically protected
- ID: 85919

Østre Gausdal Church (Norwegian: Østre Gausdal kirke) is a parish church of the Church of Norway in Gausdal Municipality in Innlandet county, Norway. It is located in Prestgarden, about 5 kilometres (3.1 mi) northwest of the village of Segalstad bru. It is the church for the Østre Gausdal parish which is part of the Sør-Gudbrandsdal prosti (deanery) in the Diocese of Hamar. The white, stone church was built in a long church design around the year 1250 using plans drawn up by an unknown architect. The church seats about 280 people.

== History ==
The earliest existing historical records of the church date back to the year 1333, but the church was not built that year. The church in Østre Gausdal was built on the Reidvoll farm around the year 1250. Originally, it was called Gausdal Church (later the word "Østre" or "Eastern" was added to distinguish it from the new Vestre Gausdal Church). It was originally a long church with a rectangular nave (about half as long as the present nave) and a narrower choir with a lower roof line and a sacristy on the north side of the choir. The church was built out of stone which was quite uncommon in Oppland at that time (only three medieval stone churches were built in that region, compared with many built in other parts of Norway during that time). For centuries, this church was the church for the prestegjeld (parish) of Gausdal.

During the Northern Seven Years' War in 1567, the church was taken by the Swedish army and for a time, the building was used as a stable, and then it was later burned. Some of the interior furnishings were saved (possibly they were removed before the Swedes took the church. After the fire, the church was partially restored. Retaining walls were needed to support some of the walls and the burn marks on the walls remained obvious. Before the year 1629, a tower was built above the central part of the nave.

In 1715, the church underwent a major renovation and restoration. The old choir was torn down and the old nave was extended to the east, nearly doubling the size. A new choir and sacristy was built on the east end of the newly enlarged nave. New doors and windows were added to the walls. The roof and tower were rebuilt. In 1723, the church was sold at the Norwegian church auction, and it was purchased by Maurids Lie on behalf of the common people in Gausdal.

In 1814, this church served as an election church (Norwegian: valgkirke). Together with more than 300 other parish churches across Norway, it was a polling station for elections to the 1814 Norwegian Constituent Assembly which wrote the Constitution of Norway. This was Norway's first national elections. Each church parish was a constituency that elected people called "electors" who later met together in each county to elect the representatives for the assembly that was to meet at Eidsvoll Manor later that year.

== Media gallery ==
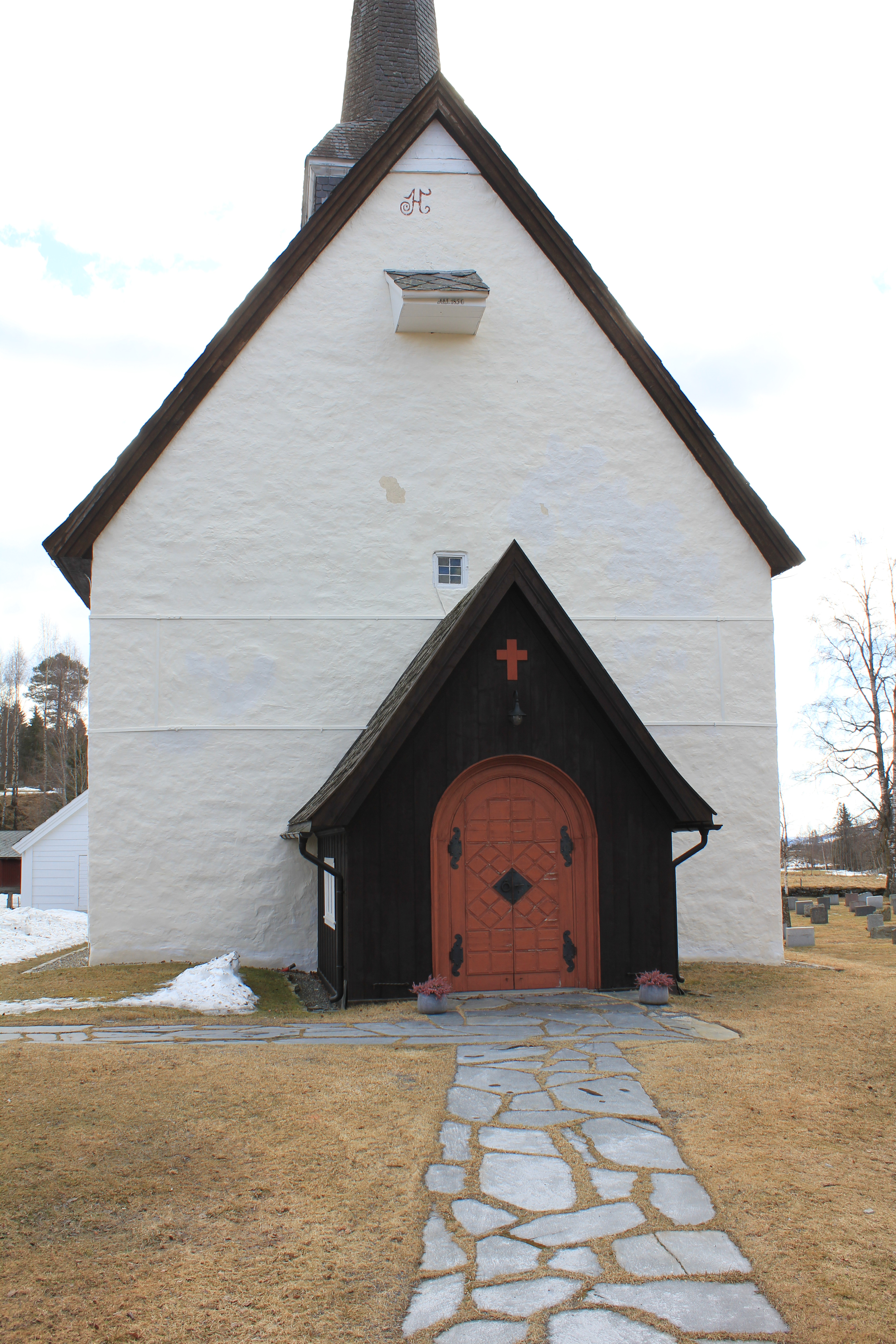

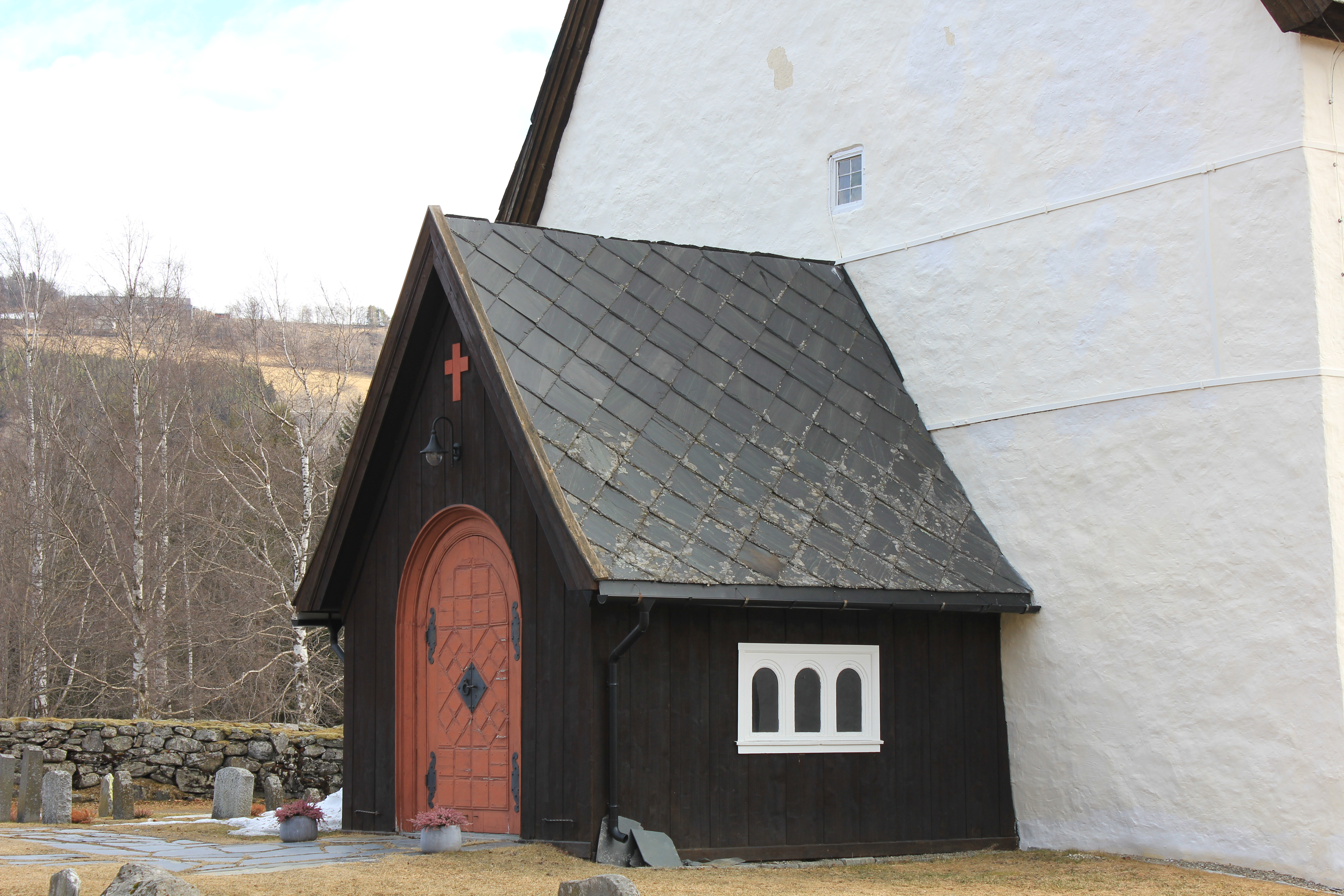

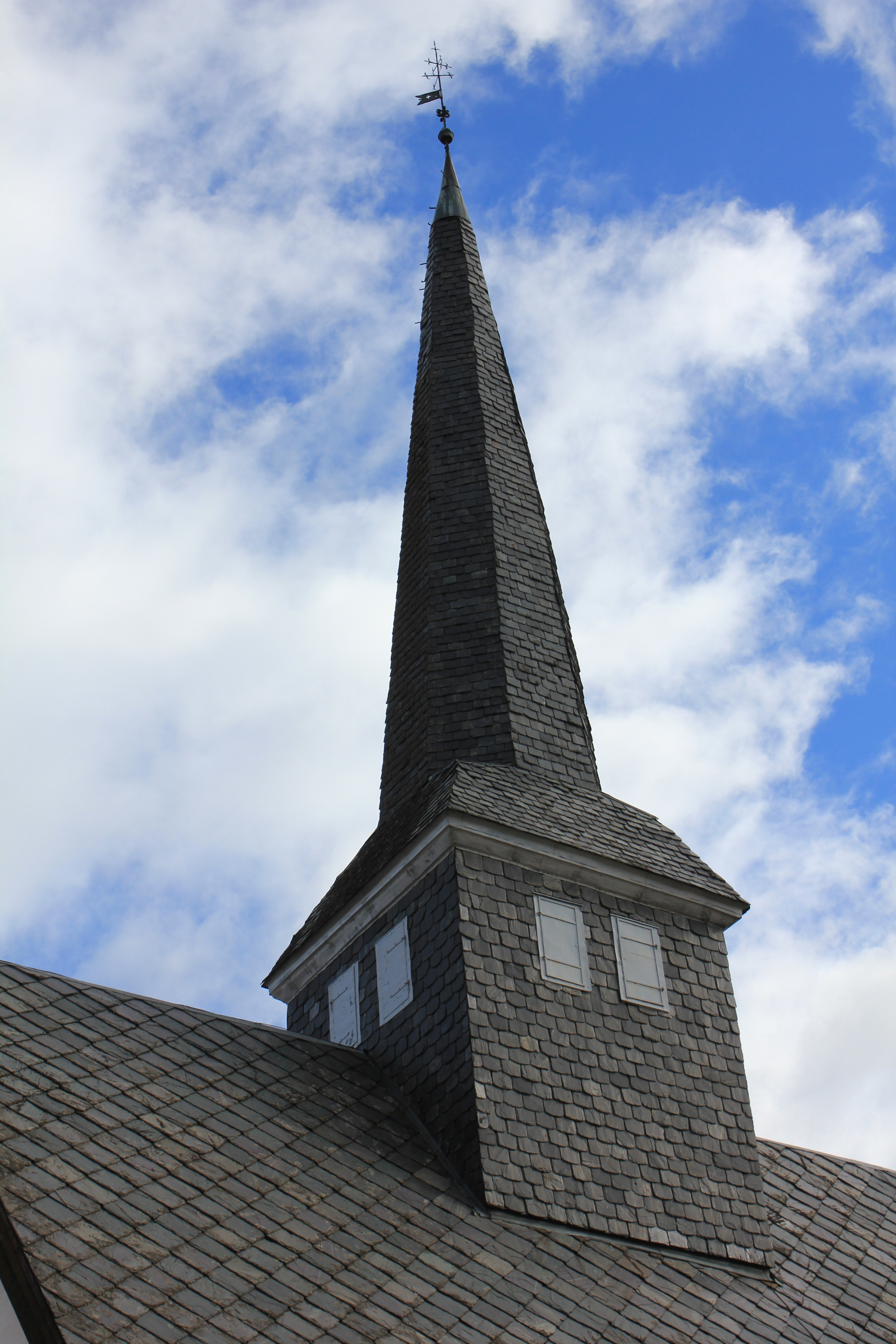

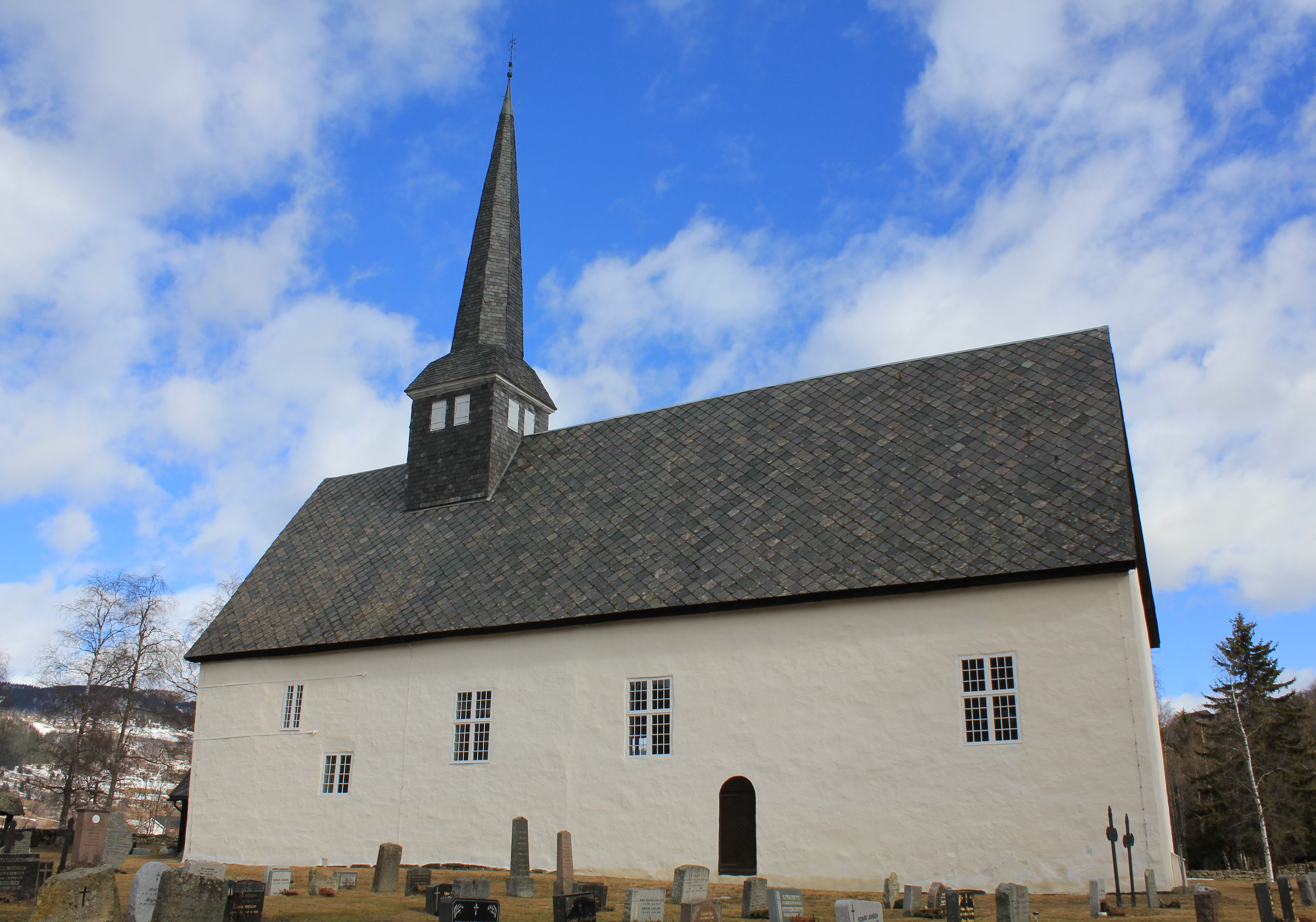

== See also ==
- List of churches in Hamar
