= Simen Fougner =

Norwegian farmer and poet (1701–1783)

Simen Fougner (1701–1783) was a Norwegian farmer, poet and non-fiction writer.

Simen Amundsen Fougner was born at Fougner in Follebu parish of Gausdal district (Fougner søndre, Follebu, Østre Gausdal) in Oppland, Norway. He was the son of farmer Amund Olsen Fougner (1652–1723). He was married to Thore Ellefsdatter Fykse (ca. 1704–1792). Fougner was an industrious and creative farmer who made good use of his land.

He is best remembered as one of the earliest Norwegian authors from a rural background. A selection of his poetry was published posthumously in 1920, and his topographical description of Gausdal was published in 1921.
