= Skeikampen =

Mountain in Innlandet, Norway

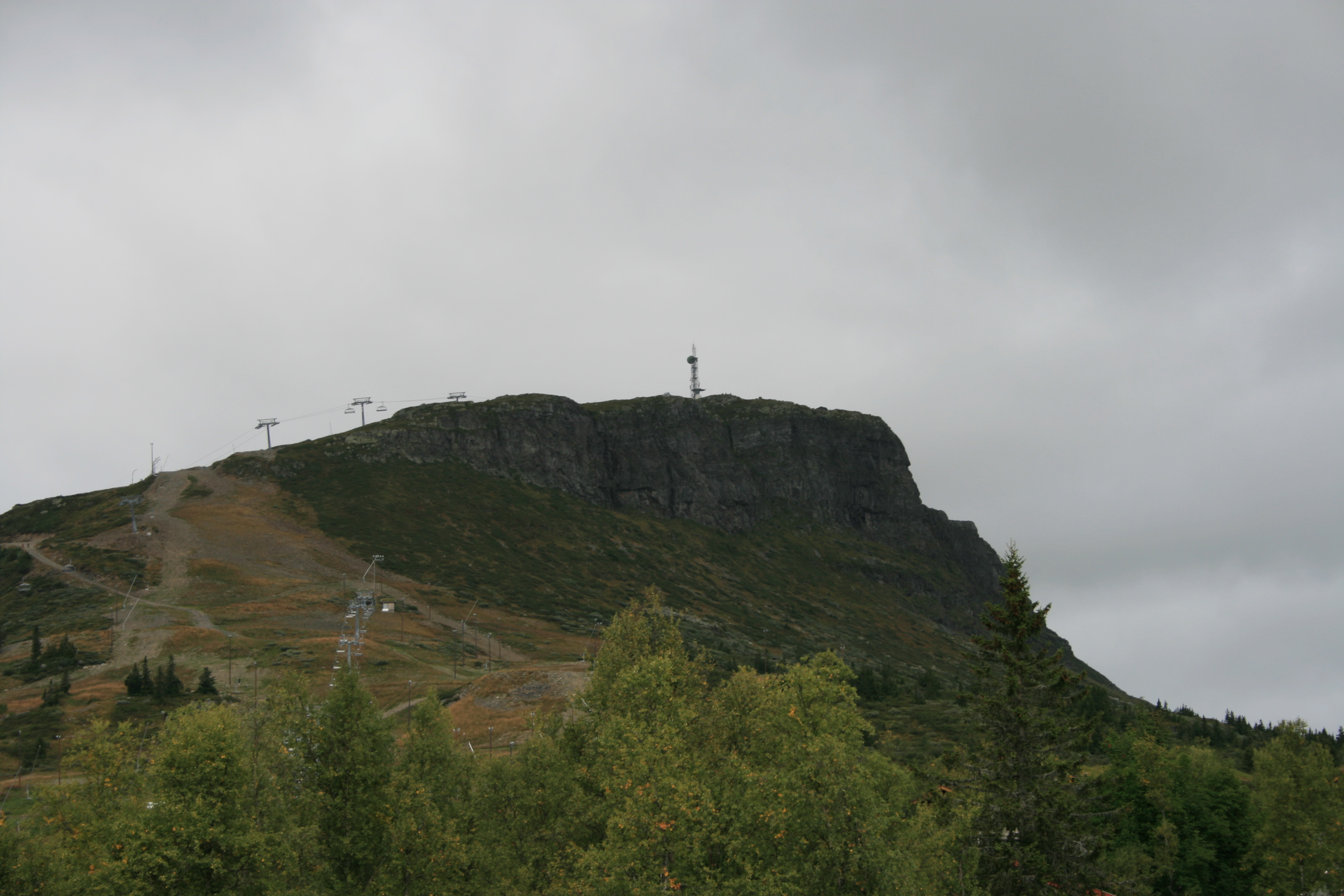
- View of the mountain

Highest point
- Elevation: 1,124 m (3,688 ft)
- Prominence: 75 m (246 ft)
- Parent peak: Prestkampen
- Isolation: 4 km (2.5 mi)
- Coordinates: 61°21′03″N 10°05′17″E

Geography
- Interactive map of the mountain
- Location: Innlandet, Norway
- Topo map: 1817 IV Fåvang

Skeikampen is a mountain located in Gausdal Municipality in Innlandet county, Norway. The 1,124-metre (3,688 ft) tall mountain is located about 9 kilometres (5.6 mi) to the northwest of the village of Svingvoll. The area is heavily dependent on recreation which is dominated by the Skeikampen Alpine Centre plus hundreds of holiday cottages.

== Attractions ==
The Skeikampen Alpine Centre is located on the mountain and it offers both ski lifts and pistes. The first cross-country tourists arrived in 1895 and the first ski lift was built in 1959. The centre is now one of Norway's largest skiing facilities. The area also has an 18-hole golf course. Tourists travel to Lillehammer, the regional transportation hub, before taking local transportation to Skeikampen. Local buses offer several daily bus departures to Skeikampen.

== Etymology ==
The first element of the name is the Old Norse word skeið meaning "race course" suggesting that there may have been such a race track here in medieval times. The last element is the finite form of kamp which means "mountain".

== See also ==
- List of mountains of Norway by height
