= Østre Gausdal Municipality =

Former municipality in Oppland, Norway

Østre Gausdal Municipality Østre Gausdal herred
- Former municipality
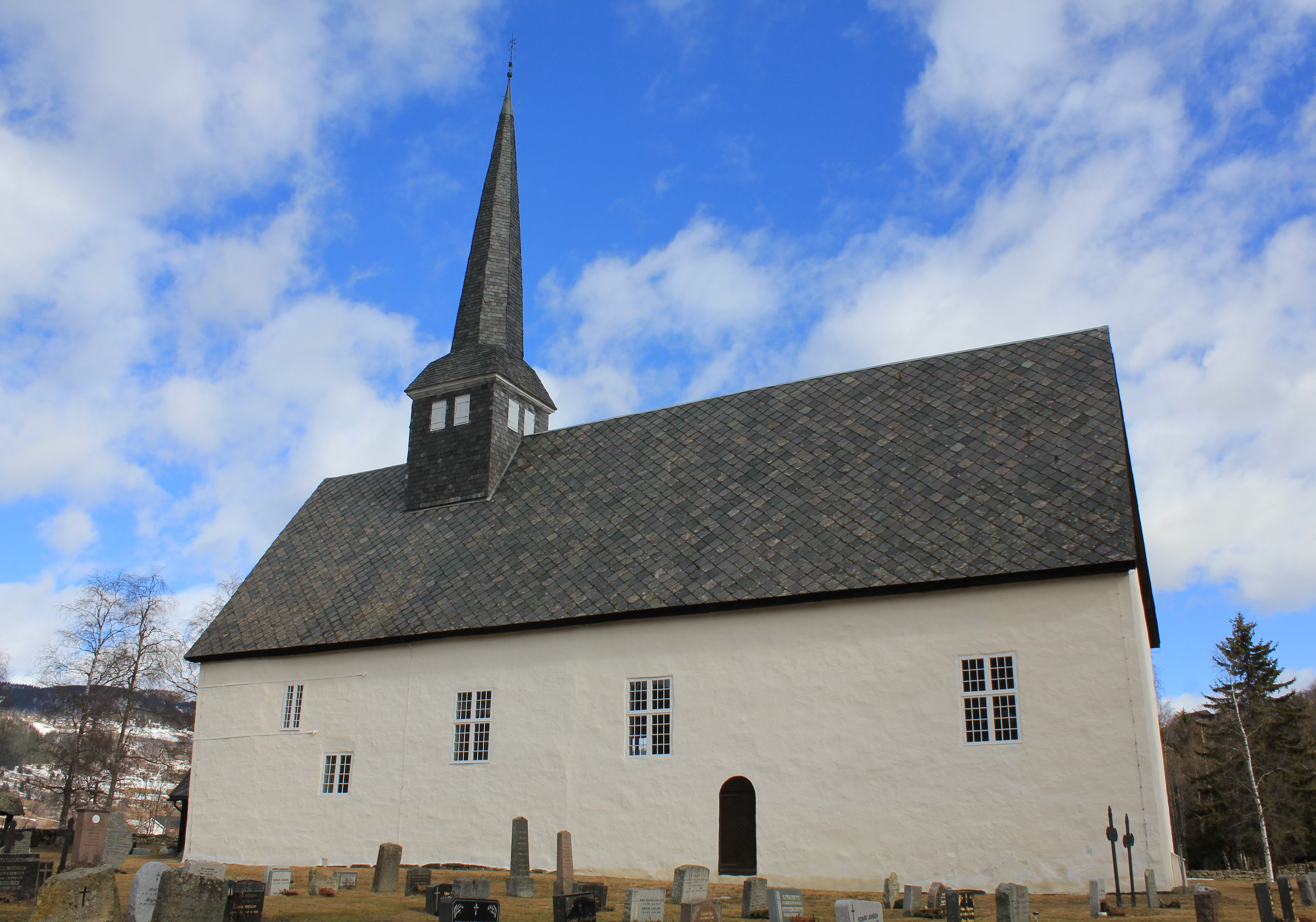
- View of the Østre Gausdal Church

- Oppland within Norway

- Østre Gausdal within Oppland
- Coordinates: 61°15′N 10°09′E
- Country: Norway
- County: Oppland
- District: Gudbrandsdal
- Established: 1879
  - Preceded by: Gausdal Municipality
- Disestablished: 1 Jan 1962
  - Succeeded by: Gausdal Municipality
- Administrative centre: Segalstad bru

Government
  - Mayor (1946-1961): Reidar Engjom (Ap)

Area (upon dissolution)
  - Total: 226.9 km^{2} (87.6 sq mi)
  - Rank: #352 in Norway
- Highest elevation: 1,446 m (4,744 ft)

Population (1961)
  - Total: 3,977
  - Rank: #214 in Norway
  - Density: 17.5/km^{2} (45/sq mi)
  - Change (10 years): ▲ +1.2%
- Demonym: Gausdøl

Official language
  - Norwegian form: Nynorsk
- Time zone: UTC+01:00 (CET)
  - Summer (DST): UTC+02:00 (CEST)
- ISO 3166 code: NO-0522

Østre Gausdal is a former municipality in the old Oppland county, Norway. The 227-square-kilometre (88 sq mi) municipality existed from 1879 until its dissolution in 1962. The area is now part of Gausdal Municipality in the traditional district of Gudbrandsdal. The administrative centre was the village of Segalstad bru.

Prior to its dissolution in 1962, the 226.9-square-kilometre (87.6 sq mi) municipality was the 352nd largest by area out of the 731 municipalities in Norway. Østre Gausdal Municipality was the 214th most populous municipality in Norway with a population of about 3,977. The municipality's population density was 17.5 inhabitants per square kilometre (45/sq mi) and its population had increased by 1.2% over the previous 10-year period.

The main church for the municipality was Østre Gausdal Church, a brick, Romanesque church built during the period 1250–1300. The church was renovated and enlarged in the 1700s.

== General information ==
In 1879, the large Gausdal Municipality was divided into two separate municipalities: Vestre Gausdal Municipality (population: 2,362) and Østre Gausdal Municipality (population: 5,911). Vestre Gausdal Municipality included the larger, more rural parts of the old municipality and Østre Gausdal Municipality was much smaller and more densely populated and it was located in the southwestern part of the old municipality. The border between the two municipalities was the river Jøra.

During the 1960s, there were many municipal mergers across Norway due to the work of the Schei Committee. On 1 January 1962, Vestre Gausdal Municipality (population: 2,590) and Østre Gausdal Municipality (population: 3,942) were reunited as Gausdal Municipality once again (with almost the same boundaries as the old Gausdal Municipality).

=== Name ===
When the large Gausdal Municipality was divided into two new municipalities in 1879, the eastern part was given the prefix østre which means "eastern". The municipality is named after the Gausdalen valley (Old Norse: Gausdalr) since the municipality is located in the valley. The first element is named after the river Gausa which flows through the valley. The river name comes from the verb gjósa which means to "gush", "burst out", or "stream forcefully". The last element is dalr which means "valley" or "dale".

=== Churches ===
The Church of Norway had two parishes (sokn) within Østre Gausdal Municipality. At the time of the municipal dissolution, it was part of the Østre Gausdal prestegjeld and the Sør-Gudbrandsdal prosti (deanery) in the Diocese of Hamar.

Churches in Østre Gausdal Municipality
| Parish (sokn) | Church name | Location of the church | Year built |
|---|---|---|---|
| Østre Gausdal | Østre Gausdal Church | Prestgarden (north of Segalstad bru) | 1250 |
| Follebu | Follebu Church | Follebu | 1260 |

== Geography ==
The municipality was located in the Gausdalen valley and east of the Jøra river. Sør-Fron Municipality was to the northwest, Ringebu Municipality was to the north, Øyer Municipality was to the east, Fåberg Municipality was to the south, and Vestre Gausdal Municipality was to the west. The highest point in the municipality was the 1,446-metre (4,744 ft) tall mountain Storhøa, on the border with Sør-Fron Municipality.

== Government ==
While it existed, Østre Gausdal Municipality was responsible for primary education (through 10th grade), outpatient health services, senior citizen services, welfare and other social services, zoning, economic development, and municipal roads and utilities. The municipality was governed by a municipal council of directly elected representatives. The mayor was indirectly elected by a vote of the municipal council. The municipality was under the jurisdiction of the Eidsivating Court of Appeal.

=== Municipal council ===
The municipal council (Herredsstyre) of Østre Gausdal Municipality was made up of representatives that were elected to four year terms. The tables below show the historical composition of the council by political party.

Østre Gausdal herredsstyre 1959–1961
| Party name (in Norwegian) | Number of representatives |
|---|---|
| Labour Party (Arbeiderpartiet) | 12 |
| Centre Party (Senterpartiet) | 5 |
| Liberal Party (Venstre) | 2 |
| Local List(s) (Lokale lister) | 2 |
| Total number of members: | 21 |

Østre Gausdal herredsstyre 1955–1959
| Party name (in Norwegian) | Number of representatives |
|---|---|
| Labour Party (Arbeiderpartiet) | 11 |
| Farmers' Party (Bondepartiet) | 6 |
| Liberal Party (Venstre) | 4 |
| Total number of members: | 21 |

Østre Gausdal herredsstyre 1951–1955
| Party name (in Norwegian) | Number of representatives |
|---|---|
| Labour Party (Arbeiderpartiet) | 11 |
| Farmers' Party (Bondepartiet) | 6 |
| Liberal Party (Venstre) | 3 |
| Total number of members: | 20 |

Østre Gausdal herredsstyre 1947–1951
| Party name (in Norwegian) | Number of representatives |
|---|---|
| Labour Party (Arbeiderpartiet) | 10 |
| Farmers' Party (Bondepartiet) | 6 |
| Joint list of the Liberal Party (Venstre) and the Radical People's Party (Radikale Folkepartiet) | 4 |
| Total number of members: | 20 |

Østre Gausdal herredsstyre 1945–1947
| Party name (in Norwegian) | Number of representatives |
|---|---|
| Labour Party (Arbeiderpartiet) | 11 |
| Farmers' Party (Bondepartiet) | 5 |
| Joint list of the Liberal Party (Venstre) and the Radical People's Party (Radikale Folkepartiet) | 4 |
| Total number of members: | 20 |

Østre Gausdal herredsstyre 1937–1941*
| Party name (in Norwegian) | Number of representatives |
|---|---|
| Labour Party (Arbeiderpartiet) | 8 |
| Radical People's Party (Radikale Folkepartiet) | 5 |
| Farmers' Party (Bondepartiet) | 7 |
| Total number of members: | 20 |
Note: Due to the German occupation of Norway during World War II, no elections were held for new municipal councils until after the war ended in 1945.

=== Mayors ===
The mayor (Norwegian: ordfører) of Østre Gausdal Municipality was the political leader of the municipality and the chairperson of the municipal council. The following people have held this position:

- 1879–1879: John Svendsen Waalen
- 1879–1883: Christian Gundersen Fougner
- 1884–1888: Even Hage
- 1888–1891: Erik Enge (V)
- 1891–1895: Simen Wold
- 1896–1901: Erik Enge (V)
- 1902–1911: Sjur Fedje (ArbDem)
- 1912–1913: Johan Ferdinand Bøhmer
- 1913–1919: Kristian Lien (ArbDem)
- 1919–1940: Ivar Bjørge (ArbDem/RF)
- 1941–1945: Simen Thallaug (NS)
- 1945–1945: Ivar Bjørge (RF)
- 1946–1961: Reidar Engjom (Ap)

== See also ==
- List of former municipalities of Norway
