= Segalstad bru =

Village in Gausdal Municipality, Norway

- Village
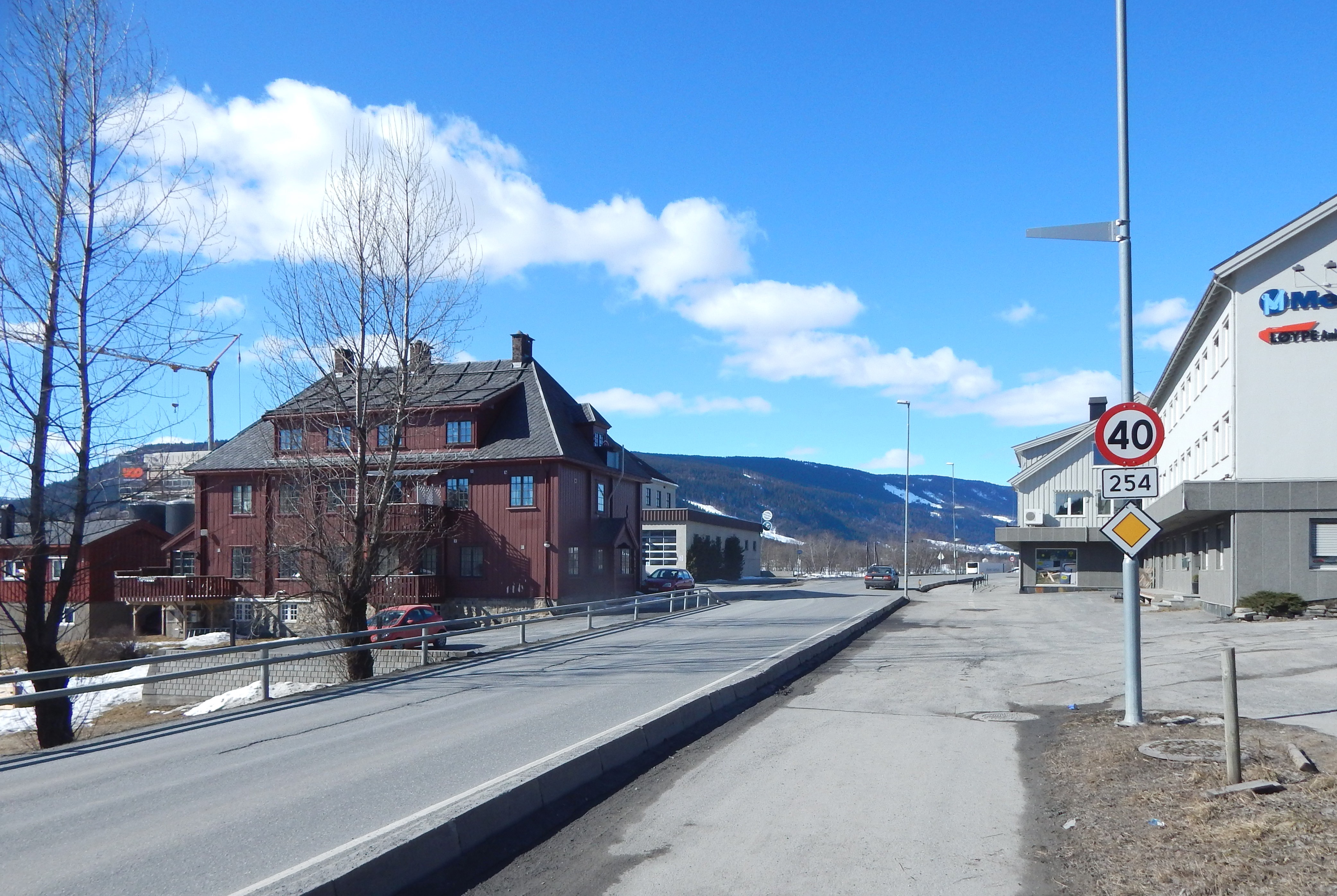
- View of the village
- Interactive map of Segalstad bru
- Location within Innlandet Location within Norway
- Coordinates: 61.2282°N 10.22261°E
- Country: Norway
- Region: Eastern Norway
- County: Innlandet
- District: Gudbrandsdal
- Municipality: Gausdal Municipality

Area
  - Total: 1.36 km^{2} (0.53 sq mi)
- Elevation: 232 m (761 ft)

Population (2024)
  - Total: 1,062
  - Density: 781/km^{2} (2,020/sq mi)
- Time zone: UTC+01:00 (CET)
  - Summer (DST): UTC+02:00 (CEST)
- Post Code: 2651 Østre Gausdal

Segalstad bru (lit. 'Segalstad bridge') is the administrative centre of Gausdal Municipality in Innlandet county, Norway. The village sits along the north side of the river Jøra, about 3 kilometres (1.9 mi) to the northwest of the village of Follebu and about 5 kilometres (3.1 mi) to the northeast of the village of Forset.

The 1.36-square-kilometre (340-acre) village has a population (2024) of 1,062 and a population density of 781 inhabitants per square kilometre (2,020/sq mi).

The village is located at the crossroads between the old Østre Gausdal Municipality and Vestre Gausdal Municipality. The village is named Segalstad bru which literally translates to Segalstad bridge. The village got its name from the actual bridge which links the two parts of the municipality on either side of the river.

== Economy ==
A number of business and shops are located at Segalstad bru, the most significant of which is the timber company, Gausdal Bruk. Moreover, Segalstad bru is home to Fjerndum primary school, Gausdal Secondary school, the municipal administration building, and some sports facilities.

There is a large dairy just outside of Segalstad bru which is one of Norway's biggest producers of brunost, a type of Norwegian goat cheese. The dairy is part of the Q-Meieriene company in 2000.

== History ==
On 26–27 April 1940, during Operation Weserübung during World War II, Segalstad bru was the site of a major battle in which several men lost their lives.
