= Sigurd Fougner =

Norwegian judge

- Born: 10 September 1879; Østre Gausdal Municipality, Norway
- Died: 20 February 1959 (aged 79)
- Occupation: Judge
- Relatives: Arthur Collett (brother-in-law)

Sigurd Fougner (10 September 1879 – 20 February 1959) was a Norwegian judge.

He was born in Østre Gausdal Municipality to Frits Hansen and Ingeborg Marie Heftye, and was married to Dagny Collett, a sister of physician Arthur Collett. He graduated as cand.jur. in 1901, and was named as a Supreme Court Justice from 1938.
