= Vestre Gausdal Municipality =

Former municipality in Oppland, Norway

Vestre Gausdal Municipality Vestre Gausdal herred
- Former municipality
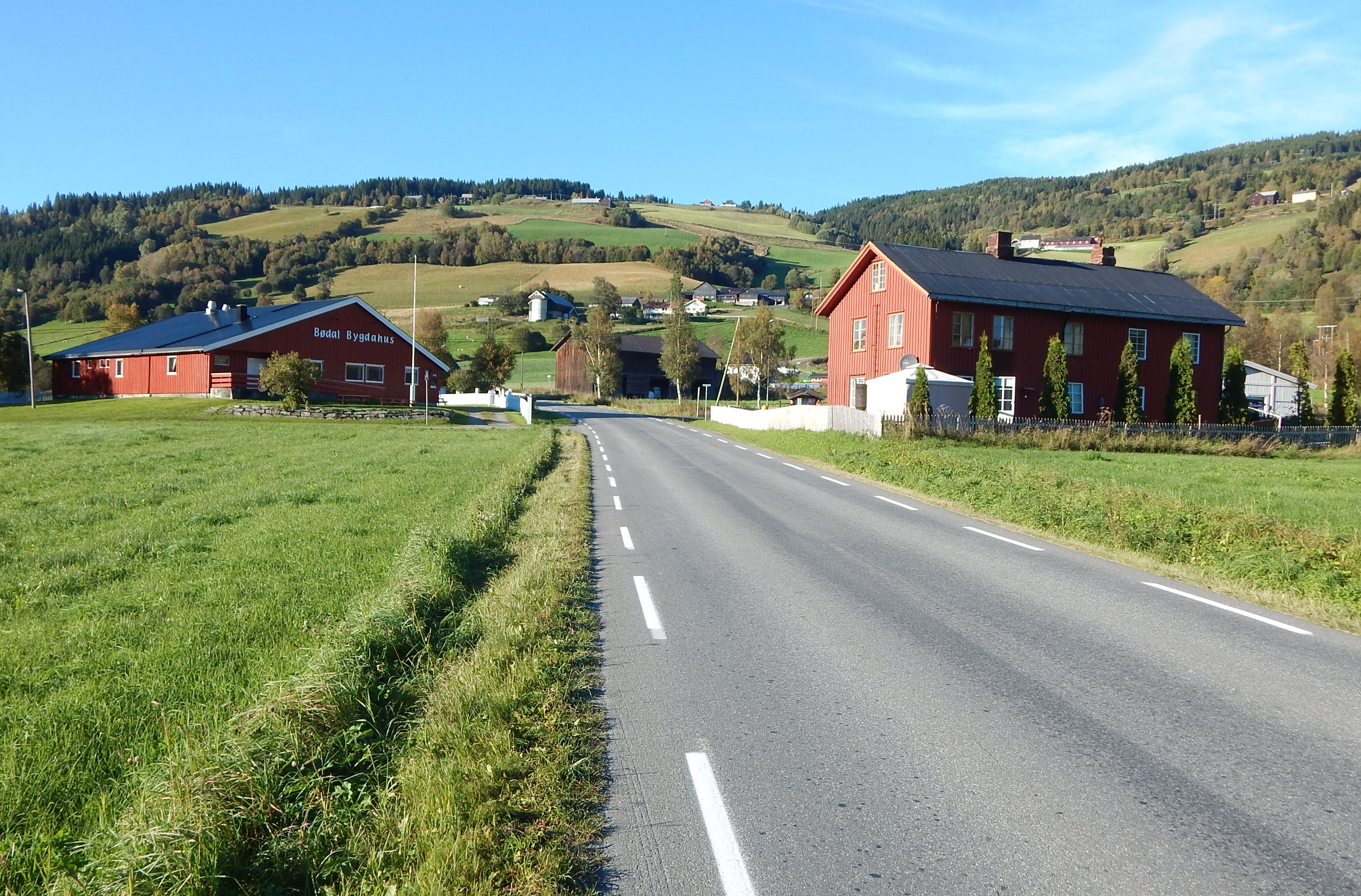
- View of the Bødalen area in Vestre Gausdal

- Oppland within Norway

- Vestre Gausdal within Oppland
- Coordinates: 61°12′N 10°09′E
- Country: Norway
- County: Oppland
- District: Gudbrandsdal
- Established: 1879
  - Preceded by: Gausdal Municipality
- Disestablished: 1 Jan 1962
  - Succeeded by: Gausdal Municipality
- Administrative centre: Forset

Government
  - Mayor (1960-1961): Jørgen Johansen (Ap)

Area (upon dissolution)
  - Total: 955.8 km^{2} (369.0 sq mi)
  - Rank: #90 in Norway
- Highest elevation: 1,552.51 m (5,093.5 ft)

Population (1961)
  - Total: 2,630
  - Rank: #351 in Norway
  - Density: 2.8/km^{2} (7.3/sq mi)
  - Change (10 years): ▼ −6.7%
- Demonym: Gausdøl

Official language
  - Norwegian form: Neutral
- Time zone: UTC+01:00 (CET)
  - Summer (DST): UTC+02:00 (CEST)
- ISO 3166 code: NO-0523

Vestre Gausdal is a former municipality in the old Oppland county, Norway. The 956-square-kilometre (369 sq mi) municipality existed from 1879 until its dissolution in 1962. The area is now part of Gausdal Municipality in the traditional district of Gudbrandsdal. The administrative centre was the village of Forset.

Prior to its dissolution in 1962, the 955.8-square-kilometre (369.0 sq mi) municipality was the 90th largest by area out of the 731 municipalities in Norway. Vestre Gausdal Municipality was the 351st most populous municipality in Norway with a population of about 2,630. The municipality's population density was 2.8 inhabitants per square kilometre (7.3/sq mi) and its population had decreased by 6.7% over the previous 10-year period.

== General information ==
In 1879, the large Gausdal Municipality was divided into two separate municipalities: Vestre Gausdal Municipality (population: 2,362) and Østre Gausdal Municipality (population: 5,911). Vestre Gausdal Municipality included the larger, more rural parts of the old municipality and Østre Gausdal was much smaller and more densely populated and it was located in the southwestern part of the old municipality. The border between the two municipalities was the river Jøra.

During the 1950s, there was a boundary dispute between the neighboring Vestre Gausdal Municipality and Sør-Fron Municipality. On 27 July 1956, a land court determined the final boundary between the two municipalities and a small part of Vestre Gausdal Municipality (population: 7) was transferred to the neighboring Sør-Fron Municipality.

During the 1960s, there were many municipal mergers across Norway due to the work of the Schei Committee. On 1 January 1962, Vestre Gausdal Municipality (population: 2,590) and Østre Gausdal Municipality (population: 3,942) were reunited as Gausdal Municipality once again (with almost the same boundaries as the old Gausdal Municipality).

=== Name ===
When the large Gausdal Municipality was divided into two new municipalities in 1879, the western part was given the prefix vestre which means "western". The municipality is named after the Gausdalen valley (Old Norse: Gausdalr) since the municipality is located in the valley. The first element is named after the river Gausa which flows through the valley. The river name comes from the verb gjósa which means to "gush", "burst out", or "stream forcefully". The last element is dalr which means "valley" or "dale".

=== Churches ===
The Church of Norway had two parishes (sokn) within Vestre Gausdal Municipality. At the time of the municipal dissolution, it was part of the Vestre Gausdal prestegjeld and the Sør-Gudbrandsdal prosti (deanery) in the Diocese of Hamar.

Churches in Vestre Gausdal Municipality
Parish (sokn)	Church name	Location of the church	Year built
Vestre Gausdal	Vestre Gausdal Church	Forset	1784
Vestre Gausdal	Aulstad Chapel	Aulstad	1864
Svatsum	Svatsum Church	Svatsum	1860

== Geography ==
The municipality was located in the Gausdalen valley and east of the Jøra river. Sør-Fron Municipality was to the north, Østre Gausdal Municipality was to the east, Fåberg Municipality was to the southeast, Torpa Municipality was to the south, Nord-Aurdal Municipality was to the southwest, and Øystre Slidre Municipality was to the west. The highest point in the municipality was the 1,552.51-metre (5,093.5 ft) tall mountain Nordre Langsua on the northern border with Sør-Fron Municipality.

== Government ==
While it existed, Vestre Gausdal Municipality was responsible for primary education (through 10th grade), outpatient health services, senior citizen services, welfare and other social services, zoning, economic development, and municipal roads and utilities. The municipality was governed by a municipal council of directly elected representatives. The mayor was indirectly elected by a vote of the municipal council. The municipality was under the jurisdiction of the Eidsivating Court of Appeal.

=== Municipal council ===
The municipal council (Heradsstyre) of Vestre Gausdal Municipality was made up of representatives that were elected to four year terms. The tables below show the historical composition of the council by political party.

Vestre Gausdal heradsstyre 1959–1961
Party name (in Nynorsk)	Number of representatives
Labour Party (Arbeidarpartiet)	12
Centre Party (Senterpartiet)	7
Liberal Party (Venstre)	2
Total number of members:	21

Vestre Gausdal heradsstyre 1955–1959
Party name (in Nynorsk)	Number of representatives
Labour Party (Arbeidarpartiet)	10
Farmers' Party (Bondepartiet)	6
Liberal Party (Venstre)	5
Total number of members:	21

Vestre Gausdal heradsstyre 1951–1955
Party name (in Nynorsk)	Number of representatives
Labour Party (Arbeidarpartiet)	15
Farmers' Party (Bondepartiet)	8
Liberal Party (Venstre)	1
Total number of members:	24

Vestre Gausdal heradsstyre 1947–1951
Party name (in Nynorsk)	Number of representatives
Labour Party (Arbeidarpartiet)	15
Farmers' Party (Bondepartiet)	9
Total number of members:	24

Vestre Gausdal heradsstyre 1945–1947
Party name (in Nynorsk)	Number of representatives
Labour Party (Arbeidarpartiet)	15
Farmers' Party (Bondepartiet)	7
Joint list of the Liberal Party (Venstre) and the Radical People's Party (Radikale Folkepartiet)	2
Total number of members:	24

Vestre Gausdal heradsstyre 1937–1941*
Party name (in Nynorsk)	Number of representatives
Labour Party (Arbeidarpartiet)	13
Radical People's Party (Radikale Folkepartiet)	1
Farmers' Party (Bondepartiet)	8
Local List(s) (Lokale lister)	2
Total number of members:	24
Note: Due to the German occupation of Norway during World War II, no elections were held for new municipal councils until after the war ended in 1945.

=== Mayors ===
The mayor (Nynorsk: ordførar) of Vestre Gausdal Municipality was the political leader of the municipality and the chairperson of the municipal council. The following people have held this position:

- 1879–1881: Rev. John Christian Bergan
- 1882–1891: Sven Kalstad
- 1892–1895: Simen Kalstad
- 1896–1897: Peter Kraabøl
- 1898–1901: Simen Kalstad
- 1902–1904: Peter Kraabøl(H)
- 1905–1910: Martin Kraabøl
- 1911–1913: Peter Kraabøl (H)
- 1914–1916: Johannes Galaasen
- 1917–1919: Hans N. Bø
- 1920–1922: Einar Galåsen (ArbDem)
- 1923–1925: Arne Kalstad (Bp)
- 1923–1931: Einar Galåsen (RF)
- 1931–1934: Olav Kirkebø (Bp)
- 1934–1937: Einar Galåsen (RF)
- 1937–1940: Hans Høistad (Ap)
- 1941–1941: Olav Kirkebø (Bp)
- 1941–1945: Thoralf Helleberg (NS)
- 1945–1956: Hans Høistad (Ap)
- 1956–1957: Hans Krag Sandberg (RF)
- 1958–1959: Magnus Saghaugen (Ap)
- 1960–1961: Jørgen Johansen (Ap)

== See also ==
- List of former municipalities of Norway
