= Vestre Gausdal Church =

Church in Innlandet, Norway

- Vestre Gausdal kirke
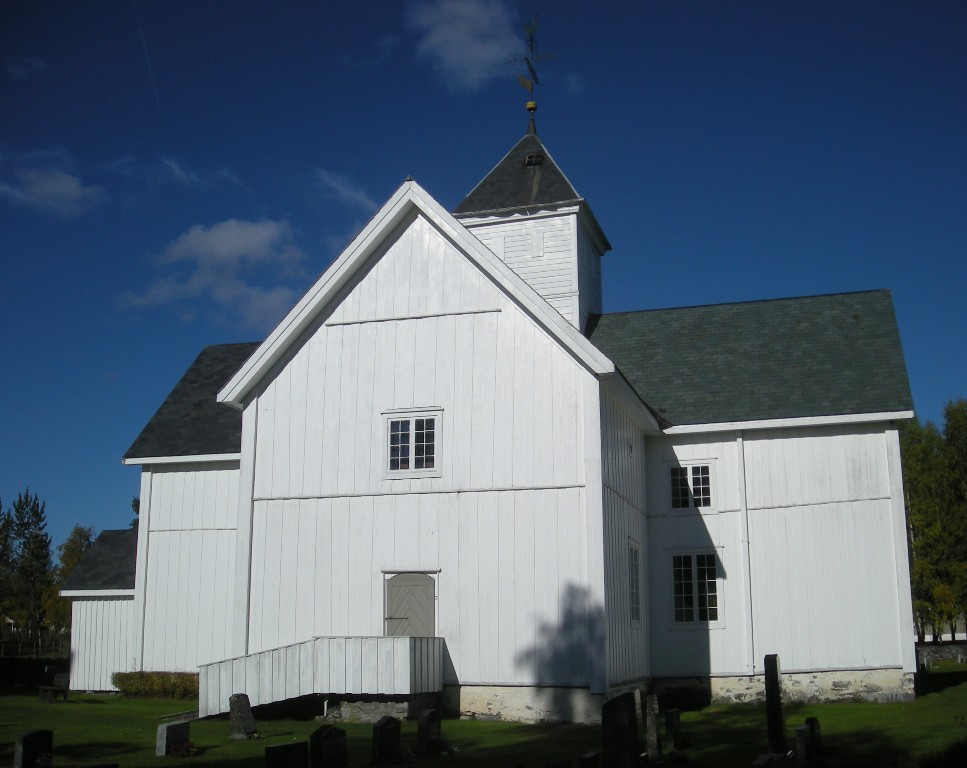
- View of the church
- Vestre Gausdal Church
- 61°12′01″N 10°08′51″E
- Location: Gausdal Municipality, Innlandet
- Country: Norway
- Denomination: Church of Norway
- Previous denomination: Catholic Church
- Churchmanship: Evangelical Lutheran

History
- Status: Parish church
- Founded: 12th century
- Consecrated: 27 October 1784

Architecture
- Functional status: Active
- Architect: Per Korpberget
- Architectural type: Cruciform
- Completed: 1781 (245 years ago)

Specifications
- Capacity: 400
- Materials: Wood

Administration
- Diocese: Hamar bispedømme
- Deanery: Sør-Gudbrandsdal prosti
- Parish: Vestre Gausdal
- Norwegian Cultural Heritage Site
- Type: Church
- Status: Automatically protected
- ID: 85817

Vestre Gausdal Church (Norwegian: Vestre Gausdal kirke or Nykirken) is a parish church of the Church of Norway in Gausdal Municipality in Innlandet county, Norway. It is located in the village of Forset. It is the church for the Vestre Gausdal parish which is part of the Sør-Gudbrandsdal prosti (deanery) in the Diocese of Hamar. The white, wooden church was built in a cruciform design in 1784 using plans drawn up by the architect Per Korpberget. The church seats about 400 people.

== History ==
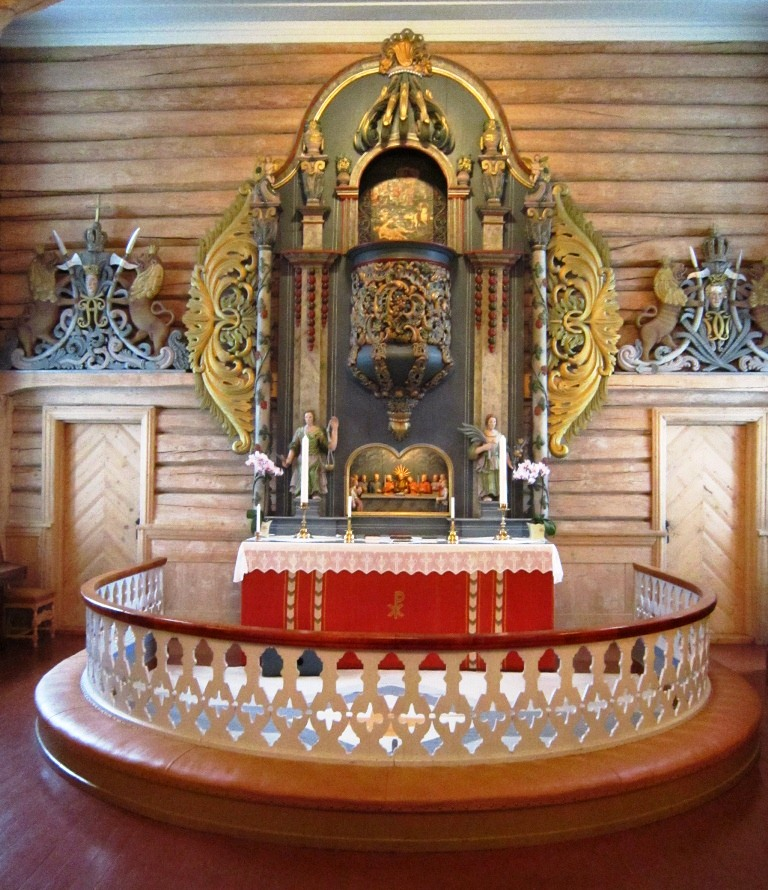
View of the interior

The first church for Vestre Gausdal was a wooden stave church that was likely built during the 12th century. This church was built in Bødalen, about 6.5 kilometres (4.0 mi) northwest of the present church site. The Nordic Museum in Stockholm have two carved boards from the old stave church that have been dated to the early 12th century, likely the date the church was first constructed. This church was usually referred to as the Bødalen Stave Church. In 1665, the old church was renovated and repaired.

In 1781, a new church was constructed at Forset, about 6.5 kilometres (4.0 mi) to the southeast of the old church site. The church was designed and built by Per Korpberget. The new church was mostly built in 1781, but due to a lack of funds, much of the interior work and furnishings took longer. The church was not formally consecrated until 27 October 1784. When the church was completed, it was often referred to as the "new church" (Norwegian: Nykirken) because it was the new church in Gausdal while the others were all quite old. In the church there are a couple of old figures: a Madonna with children from around the year 1300 and a bishop from around the year 1350. Both were moved to the present church from the medieval church. After the new church was completed, the old church was closed, however, it does not appear to have been demolished immediately. According to local traditions, the old church in Bødalen must have been used, among other things, as a meeting place for about one hundred years afterwards. In 1846, exterior siding was added to the church and then in 1854, the interior of the church was painted.

== See also ==
- List of churches in Hamar
