= Follebu =

Village in Gausdal Municipality, Norway

- Village
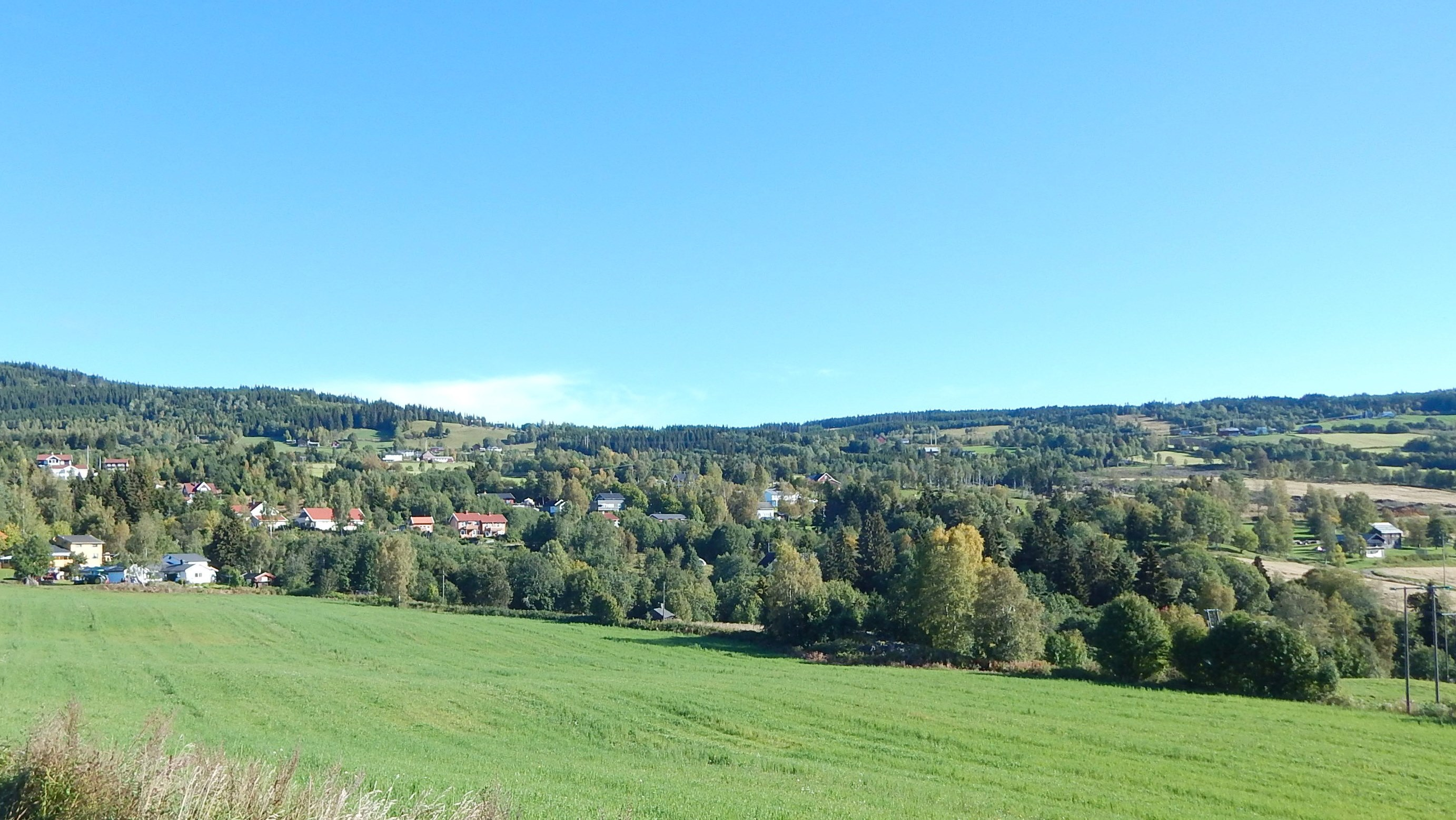
- View of the village area
- Interactive map of Follebu
- Location within Innlandet Location within Norway
- Coordinates: 61.21581°N 10.28498°E
- Country: Norway
- Region: Eastern Norway
- County: Innlandet
- District: Gudbrandsdalen
- Municipality: Gausdal Municipality

Area
  - Total: 1.14 km^{2} (0.44 sq mi)
- Elevation: 257 m (843 ft)

Population (2024)
  - Total: 1,245
  - Density: 1,092/km^{2} (2,830/sq mi)
- Time zone: UTC+01:00 (CET)
  - Summer (DST): UTC+02:00 (CEST)
- Post Code: 2656 Follebu

Follebu is a village in Gausdal Municipality in Innlandet county, Norway. The village is located along the river Gausa, about 3 kilometres (1.9 mi) to the southeast of the village of Segalstad bru. The town of Lillehammer lies about 15 kilometres (9.3 mi) to the southeast of Follebu.

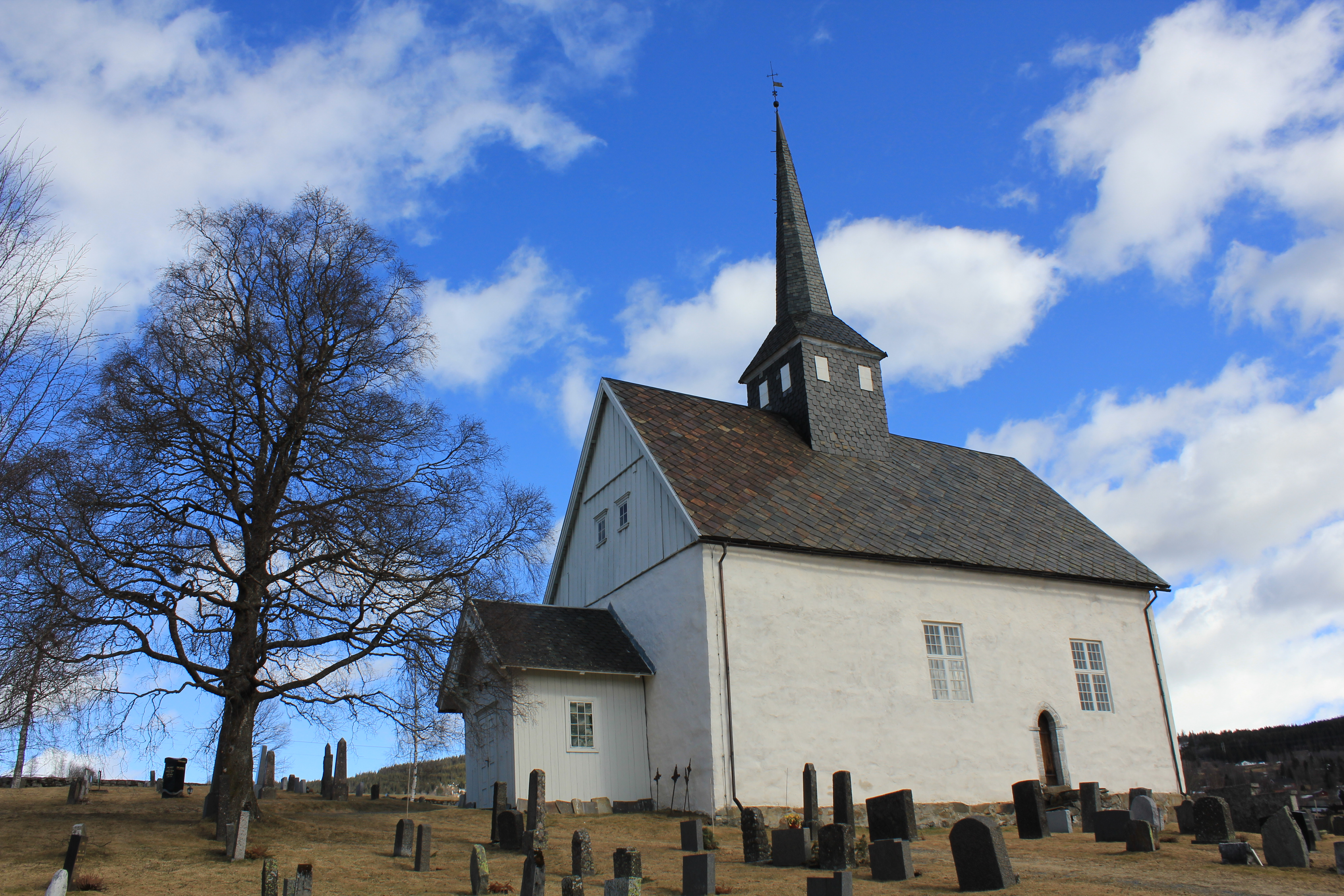
Follebu Church

Follebu Church (Norwegian: Follebu kirke) is located just to the northwest of the village. It was built in a Gothic style of stone and brick between the years 1260 and 1300.

The 1.14-square-kilometre (280-acre) village has a population (2024) of 1,245 and a population density of 1,092 inhabitants per square kilometre (2,830/sq mi).

== Name ==
The Old Norse form of the name was Foldabu. The first element is probably the genitive plural of fold which means "meadow", "plain", or "open and flat land". The last element of the name is bú which means "rural district". The area is quite flat and open, especially when it is compared to the surrounding areas.
