= Sjodalen =

Valley in Innlandet, Norway

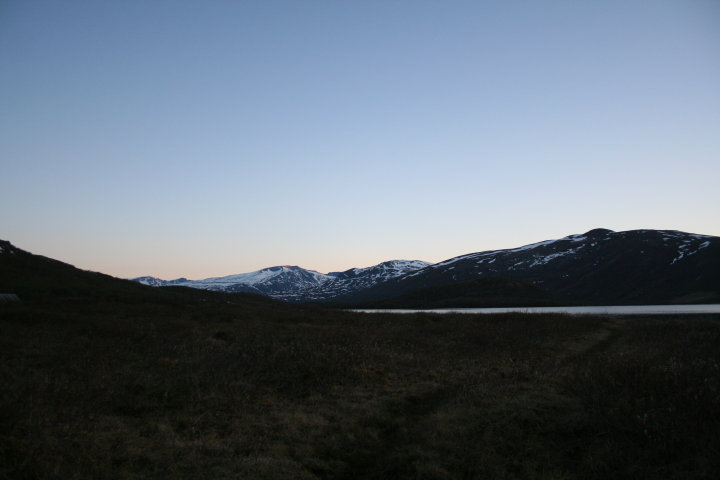
- View of the valley from Øvre Sjodalsvann

Geology
- Type: River valley

Geography
- Location: Innlandet, Norway
- Coordinates: 61.6018°N 8.97006°E

Location
- Interactive map of the valley

Sjodalen is a wide, gently sloping valley in Vågå Municipality in Innlandet county, Norway. The valley follows the river Sjoa as it drains the eastern parts of the Jotunheimen mountains. Sjodalen is generally accepted to start at the outlet from the deep mountain-lake Gjende. The valley is very narrow with high mountains on its sides. The valley heads north and ends as it opens up into the less-defined, much more open Heidal valley to the east of Randsverk. The two valleys are technically one large valley, but the narrow northbound valley is named Sjodalen in Vågå Municipality and once the valley opens up in Sel Municipality it is called Heidal.

== History ==
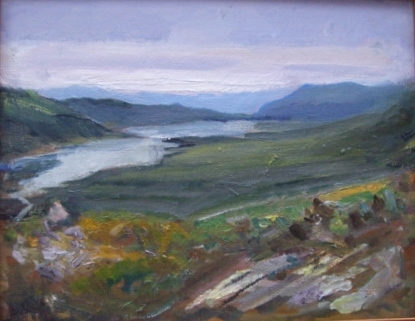
Scene From Sjodalen Roald Tvedt (2008)

The valley was traditionally used for summer farming. What is particular for the valley is the size and state of these summer farms (sæter in Norwegian). This is partly caused by the very rare tradition of winter-farming in this region. Rather than bringing the summer harvest down into the village and main farm, the farmers took the animals back up into the mountains during winter. This could be done due to the limited snow-fall in this continental climate regime.

In Sjodalen is Ridderspranget (meaning "The Knight's Leap"), a narrow gorge associated with a local legend. In the version of the legend collected by historian Ivar Kleiven, a knight named Sigvat abducts a woman named Skårvangssolen from Ivar Gjesling, and escaped his pursuers by jumping across the feature on horseback.

== Geography ==
In the valley-floor and low valley sides the landscape is dominated by pine, the highest pine-forest of Norway. Above the pine-forest and 150 m wide birch-zone before the alpine bush-vegetations leads into the higher mountains. The western side of Sjodalen is defined by the Jotun nappe, the escarpment that define the Jotunheimen National Park and these mountains reach above 2000 m above sea level.

The river Sjoa feeds two lakes on its progress down the valley: Øvre Sjodalsvatnet and Nedre Sjodalsvatnet. The Sjoa river is a popular place for fishing, rafting, and kayaking. Sjoa river is protected, as is the landscape surrounding the river. Restrictions are therefore set on camping near the river. Several traditional places to spend the night exists, including Randsverk camping, Hindsæter, Bessheim, Maurvangen and Gjendesheim.
