= Øvre Sjodalsvatnet =

Lake in Innlandet, Norway

- Øvre Sjodalsvatn
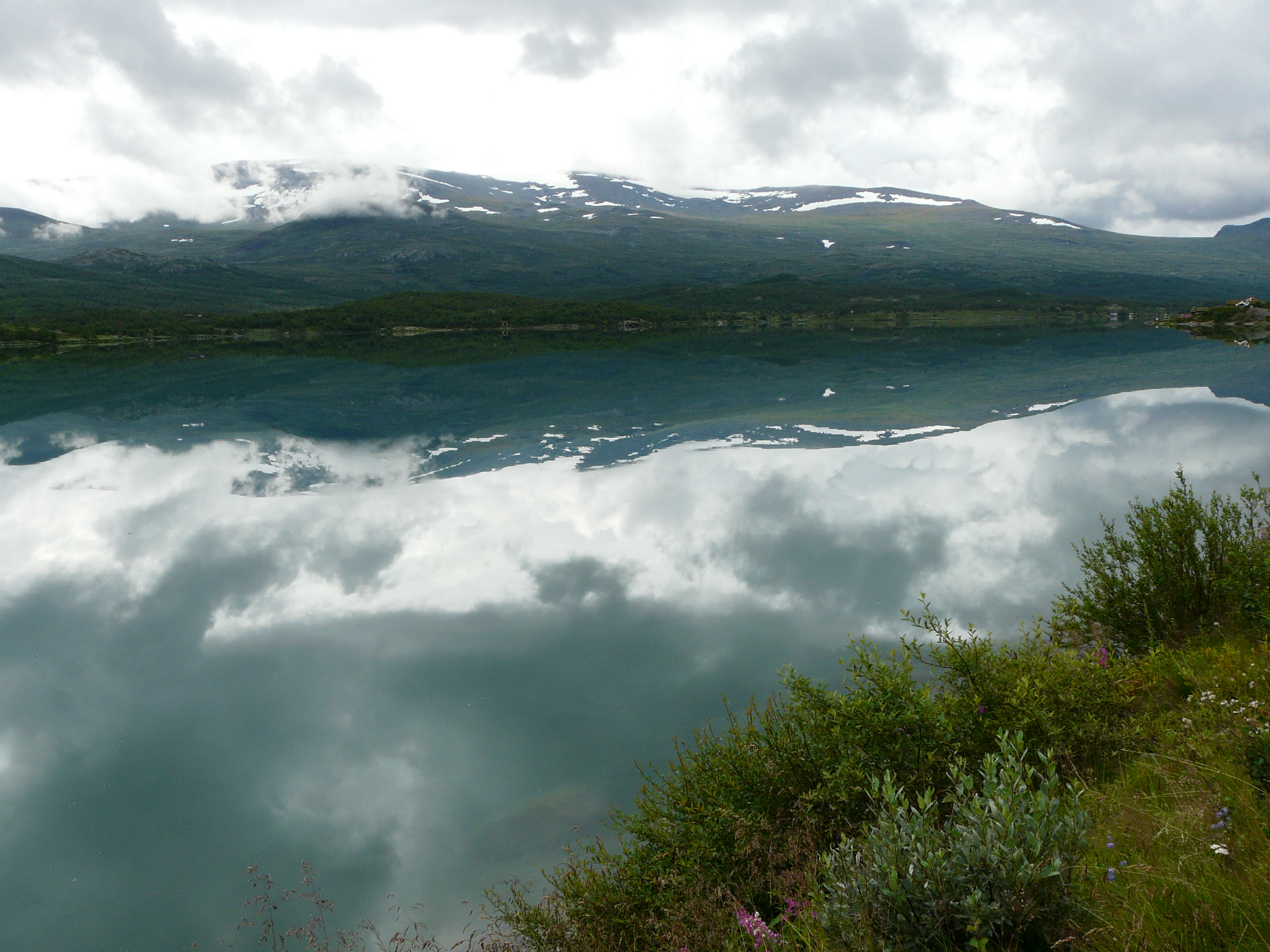
- Interactive map of the lake
- Location: Vågå Municipality, Innlandet
- Coordinates: 61°31′42″N 8°53′17″E
- Basin countries: Norway
- Max. length: 6.2 kilometres (3.9 mi)
- Max. width: 1.3 kilometres (0.81 mi)
- Surface area: 4.83 km^{2} (1.86 sq mi)
- Max. depth: 28 metres (92 ft)
- Shore length^{1}: 20 kilometres (12 mi)
- Surface elevation: 953 metres (3,127 ft)
- References: NVE
- ^{1} Shore length is not a well-defined measure.

Øvre Sjodalsvatnet is a lake in Vågå Municipality in Innlandet county, Norway. It is located in the Jotunheimen mountain range. The lake is located on the river Sjoa, just outside the boundary of Jotunheimen National Park. The Maurvangen campground and Bessheim mountain lodge are located near the southwestern shore of the lake.

The river Sjoa flows from the lake Gjende by Gjendesheim through the lakes Øvre Sjodalsvatnet and Nedre Sjodalsvatnet and all the way to the village of Sjoa in the Gudbrandsdalen valley where the river empties into the large river Gudbrandsdalslågen.

The Sjoa river is a popular site for rafting and kayak trips. The river is also known for the tourist attraction Ridderspranget.

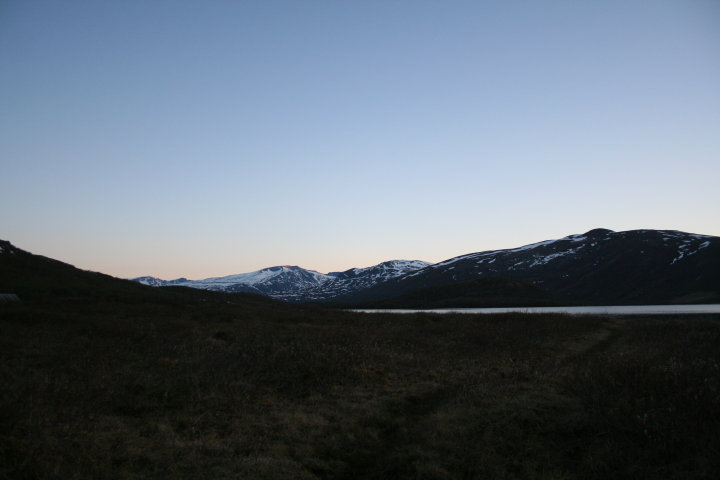
Øvre Sjodalsvaten at night, Jotunheimen in the background

== See also ==
- List of lakes in Norway
