= Veslfjellet =

Mountain in Innlandet, Norway

- Veslfjell / Veslefjell
- Interactive map of the mountain

Highest point
- Elevation: 1,743 m (5,719 ft)
- Prominence: 370 m (1,210 ft)
- Isolation: 2.5 km (1.6 mi) to Besshøe
- Coordinates: 61°30′19″N 8°45′10″E

Geography
- Location: Innlandet, Norway
- Parent range: Jotunheimen

Veslfjellet is a mountain in Vågå Municipality in Innlandet county, Norway. The 1,743-metre (5,719 ft) tall mountain is located in the Jotunheimen mountains within Jotunheimen National Park. The mountain sits about 44 kilometres (27 mi) southwest of the village of Vågåmo and about 30 kilometres (19 mi) northwest of the village of Beitostølen. The mountain is surrounded by several other notable mountains including Kollhøin and Besshøe to the northwest, Besseggen and Gloptinden to the west, Bukkehåmåren to the southwest, and Heimdalshøe to the southeast. The lake Bessvatnet lies just north of the mountain.

== See also ==
- List of mountains of Norway by height
