= Memurubu =

Building in Lom, Oppland, Norway

Coordinates: 61°29′18″N 8°37′52″E

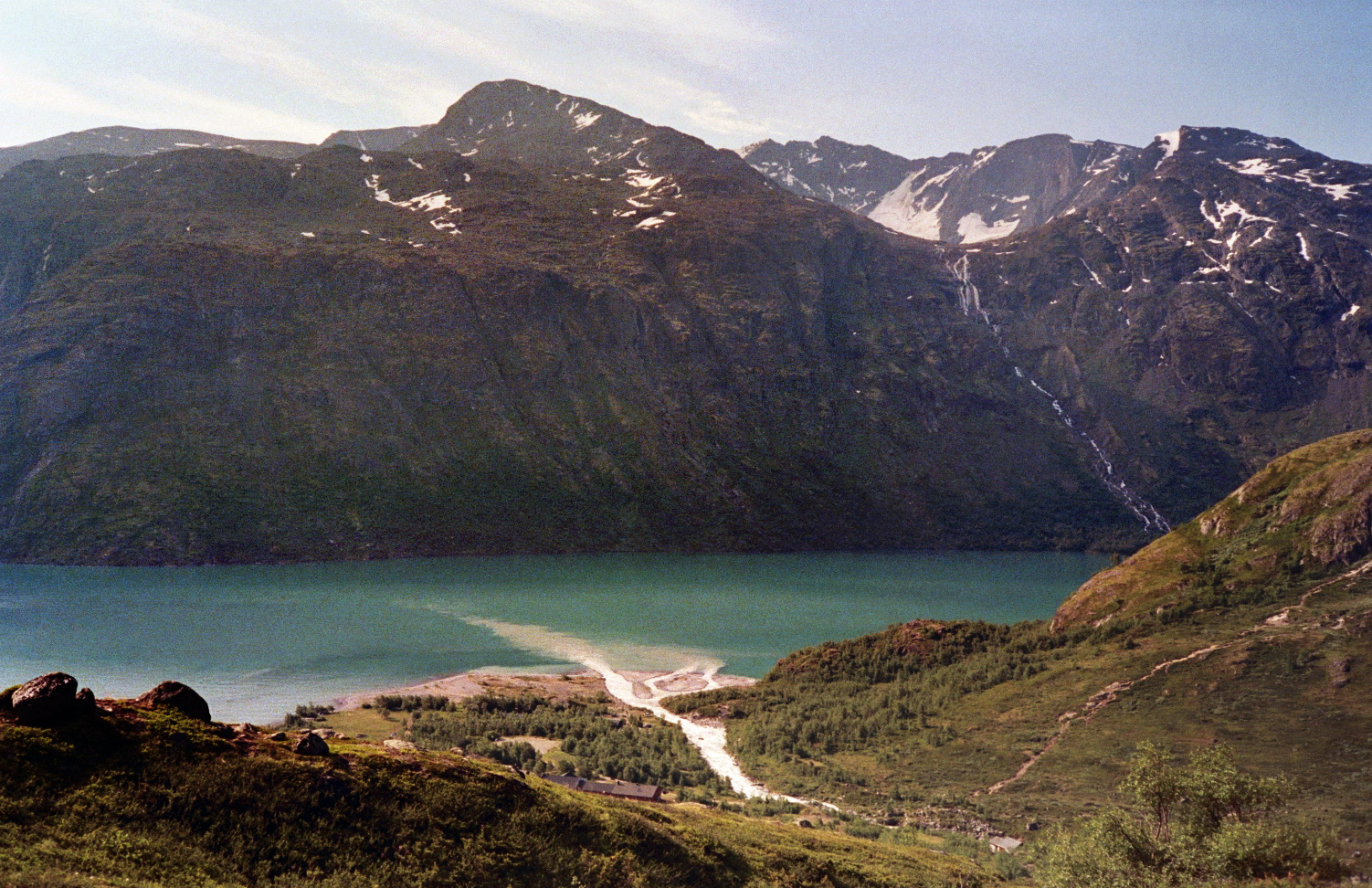
The mouth of the river Muru emptying into Gjende lake next to Memurubu.

Memurubu is a tourist hut in Norway, at the end or start of the famous Besseggen hiking trail. Memurubu is originally an old mountain pasture dating back to 1872, but has had tourists just as long. Cows are still grazing around the tourist hut, which lies at the mouth of the river Muru in the valley Memurudalen. After a fire destroyed the original lodge in 1998 it was rebuilt. The new facility has a few family rooms with shower and bathrooms, although most of the 150 bunks are in double or quadruple occupancy rooms.

Memurubu was the fourth cabin in Norway set up by Norwegian Mountain Touring Association (DNT) but is now privately owned, though members of DNT obtain cheaper prices.

The lodge produces its own green power from its hydroelectric generator.

Hiking along the Besseggen trail, one ends at Gjendesheim at the eastern end of the lake Gjende. Hiking westwards along Gjende over Bukkelægret, one ends at Gjendebu at the western end of Gjende. From Memurubu, the mountain Surtningssue is also accessible through the valley Memurudalen

== Excursions ==
Memurubu is one of the starting points for excursions to the peaks of the Besseggen group, including Surtningssue (2 368 m) and Besshøe (2 258 m), passing through the Memurudalen valley. A westward-pointing trail also passes the Bukkelægret peak and ends at the Gjendebu refuge, at the western end of Lake Gjende.

It is also possible to walk along the northern shore of Lake Gjende to Gjendesheim, reachable in 3.5–4 hours.

The area is also renowned for fishing. The most common places for fishing are Gjende and Memurutunga, the latter being about 1.5 hours from Memurubu in the direction of Bukkelægret.
