= Kollhøin =

Mountain in Innlandet, Norway

- Interactive map of the mountain

Highest point
- Elevation: 1,925 m (6,316 ft)
- Prominence: 39 m (128 ft)
- Parent peak: Besshøe
- Isolation: 0.712 km (0.442 mi)
- Coordinates: 61°32′10″N 8°41′52″E

Geography
- Location: Innlandet, Norway
- Parent range: Jotunheimen
- Topo map: 1618 III Glittertinden

Kollhøin is a mountain in Vågå Municipality in Innlandet county, Norway. The 1,925-metre (6,316 ft) tall mountain is located in the Jotunheimen mountains within Jotunheimen National Park. The mountain sits about 43 kilometres (27 mi) southwest of the village of Vågåmo and about 35 kilometres (22 mi) northwest of the village of Beitostølen. The mountain is surrounded by several other notable mountains including Nautgardstinden to the northeast, Styggehøi to the northwest, Surtningssue to the west, Gloptinden to the southwest, Besshøe to the south, and Besseggen and Veslfjellet to the southeast.

== See also ==
- List of mountains of Norway by height
