= Besshøe =

Mountain in Innlandet, Norway

- Besshø (unofficial)
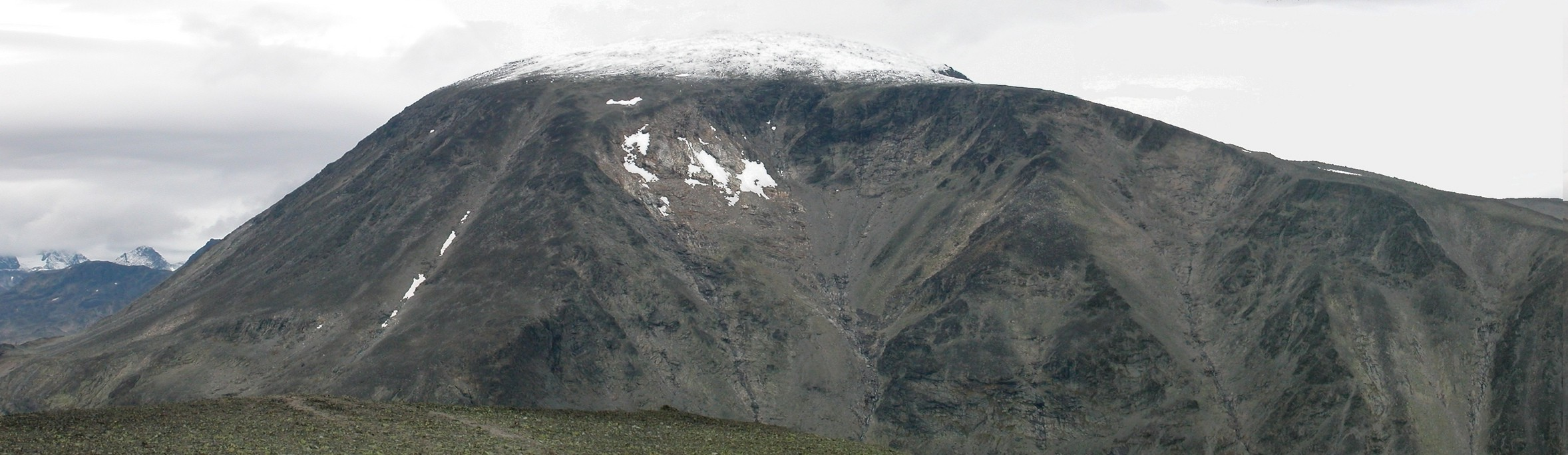
- Seen from Veslfjellet, the highest point on the Besseggen hiking trail

Highest point
- Elevation: 2,258 m (7,408 ft)
- Prominence: 850 m (2,790 ft)
- Isolation: 5.7 km (3.5 mi)
- Coordinates: 61°31′04″N 8°41′14″E

Geography
- Interactive map of the mountain
- Location: Innlandet, Norway
- Parent range: Jotunheimen
- Topo map: 1618 III Glittertinden

Besshøe is a mountain in Vågå Municipality in Innlandet county, Norway. The 2,258-metre (7,408 ft) tall mountain is located in the Jotunheimen mountains within Jotunheimen National Park. The mountain sits about 48 kilometres (30 mi) southwest of the village of Vågåmo and about 28 kilometres (17 mi) northwest of the village of Beitostølen. The mountain is surrounded by several other notable mountains including Kollhøin to the north, Veslfjellet and Besseggen to the southeast, Bukkehåmåren and Eggi to the south, and Gloptinden to the west.

The mountain lies right above the lake Bessvatnet, along the Besseggen hiking trail. On the mountain's north-eastern side is a small cirque glacier, and it is surrounded by a large ice-cored moraine, a relatively rare feature in Norway.

From Besseggen there is a nice view over the lakes Gjende and Bessvatnet. Gjende is about 400 m lower than Bessvatnet. While Bessvatnet has a blue colour common to lakes, Gjende has a green colour due to glacier runoff depositing clay into the lake (rock flour).

== Toponymy ==
The mountain is named after the lake Bessvatnet, the last element is the finite form of hø for "large and round mountain".

== See also ==
- List of mountains of Norway by height
