= Maurvangen =

Village and campground in Vågå Municipality, Norway

- Camping facility
- Interactive map of Maurvangen
- Location within Innlandet Location within Norway
- Coordinates: 61.48832°N 8.84286°E
- Country: Norway
- Region: Eastern Norway
- County: Innlandet
- District: Gudbrandsdal
- Municipality: Vågå Municipality
- Elevation: 971 m (3,186 ft)
- Time zone: UTC+01:00 (CET)
  - Summer (DST): UTC+02:00 (CEST)
- Post Code: 2683 Tessanden

Maurvangen is a small village area and campground in Vågå Municipality in Innlandet county, Norway. The area is located between the lakes Gjende and Øvre Sjodalsvatnet and a short distance from Gjendesheim.

== Campground ==
There are 26 cabins as well as camping spots for tents and caravans. A service building contains toilets, shower rooms, sauna, and a washing machine. It is located about 1,000 meters above sea level and lies next to the river Sjoa which is a popular fishing area.

Maurvangen has a small shop that sells food, hunting and fishing licenses, and a small restaurant that serves local homemade food. Maurvangen is owned and operated by the family Moen who are originally from Vågå Municipality.
