= Gjendebu =

Building in Norway

Coordinates: 61°27′07.07″N 8°29′18.61″E

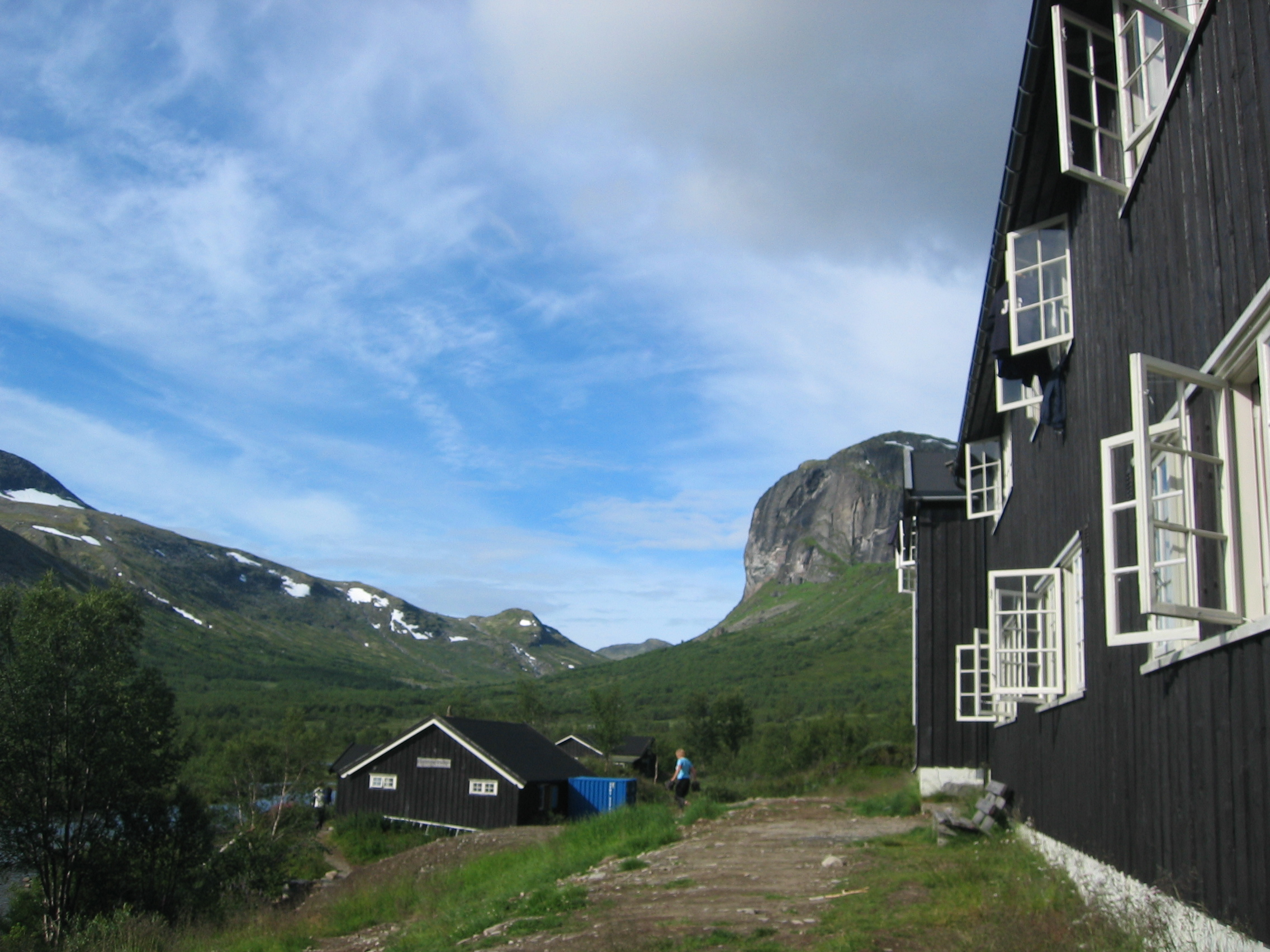
Gjendebu

Gjendebu is the oldest cabin of the Norwegian Mountain Touring Association (DNT). The cabin lies 995 metres above sea level, by the western end of the lake Gjende, central in Jotunheimen. It is accessible by hiking along marked trails, or by boat over Gjende from Gjendesheim. The cabin was built in 1871 and was at that time 45 m² and with 12 beds, today there are 119 beds.

Neighbouring cabins are Gjendesheim, Memurubu, Fondsbu, Olavsbu, Leirvassbu and Spiterstulen.
