= Muru (Lom) =

River in Jotunheimen, Norway

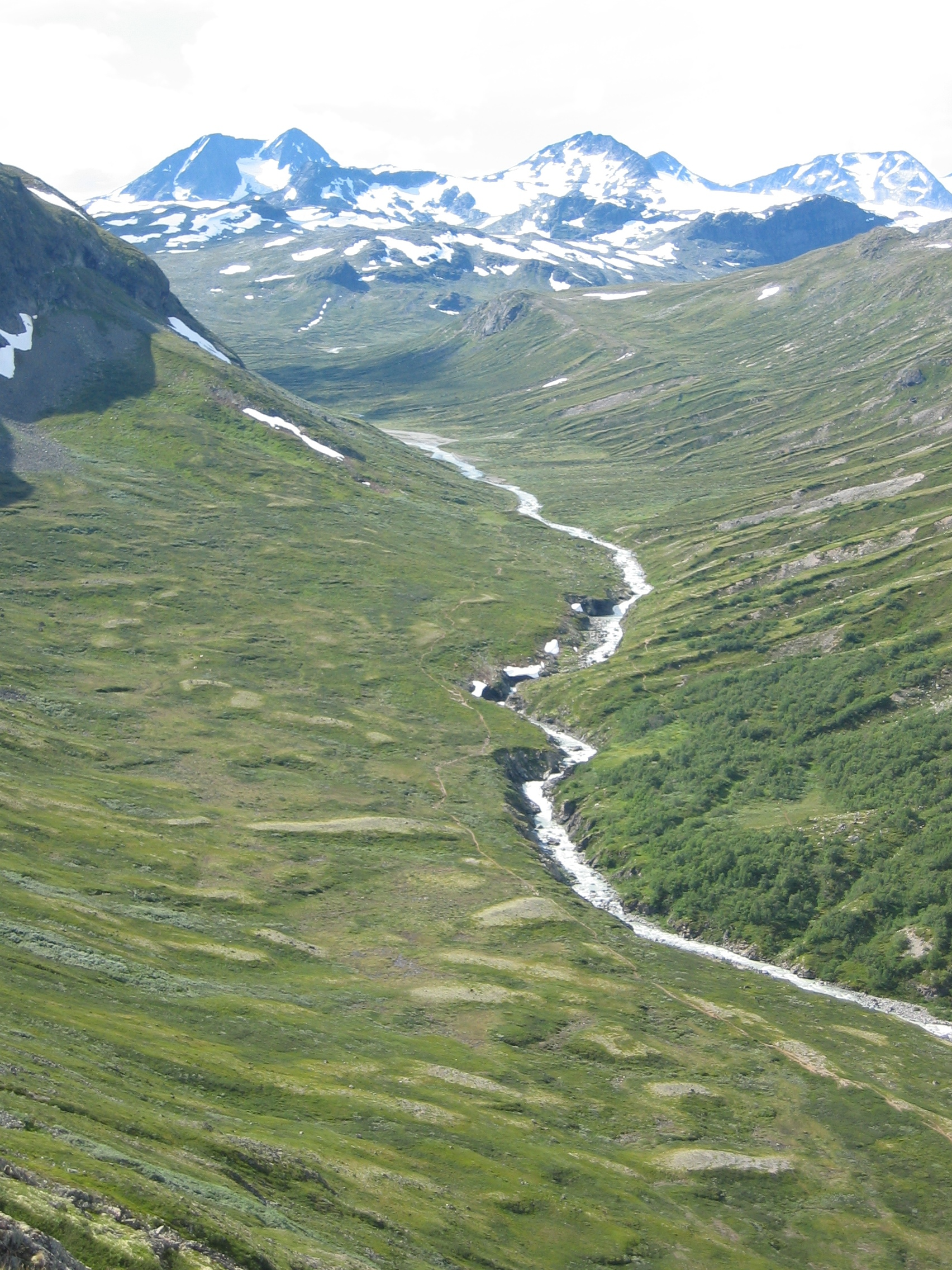
- Muru river flowing down Murudalen towards Memurubu

Location
- Country: Norway
- County: Innlandet
- Municipalities: Lom Municipality

Physical characteristics
- Source: Austre Memurubrean glacier
  - location: Lom Municipality, Norway
  - coordinates: 61.54386641°N 8.51174354°E
  - elevation: 1,680 metres (5,510 ft)
- Mouth: Lake Gjende
  - location: Memurubu, Lom Municipality, Norway
  - coordinates: 61°29′15″N 8°37′50″E
  - elevation: 984 metres (3,228 ft)
- Length: 13.1 km (8.1 mi)
- Basin size: 77.43 km^{2} (29.90 sq mi)
- Discharge
  - average: 3 m^{3}/s (110 cu ft/s)

Muru is a river in Lom Municipality in Innlandet county, Norway. The 13.1-kilometre (8.1 mi) long river runs through the Memurudalen valley in the Jotunheimen mountains. It originates on the mountain Memurutinden at the glacier Austre Memurubrean, runs through Memurudalen valley, and finally empties into the lake Gjende besides Memurubu. The river is the primary source for the lake.

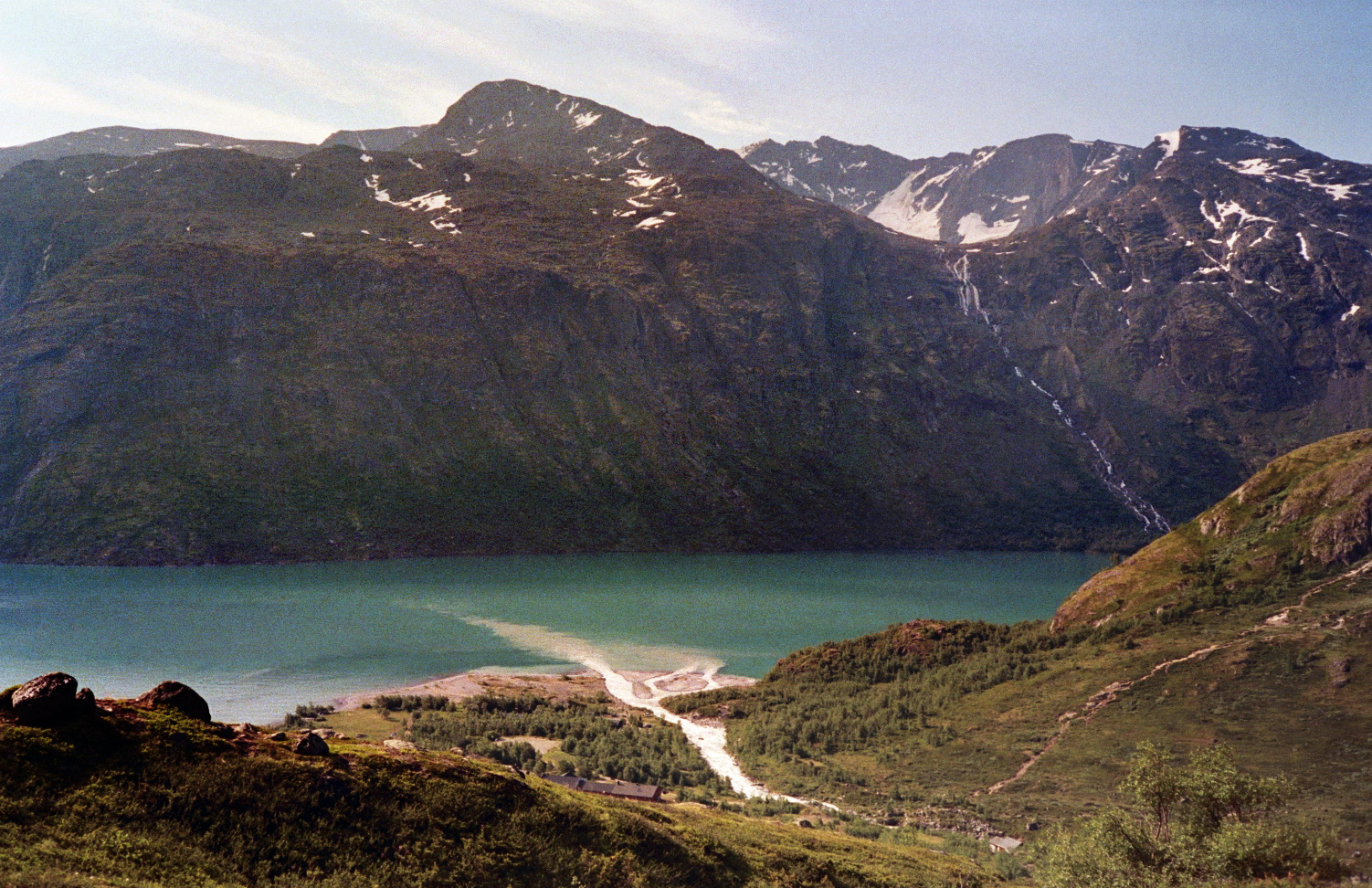
The river Muru empties into Gjende lake next to Memurubu.

A unique aspect lake Gjende is its distinctive green color, a result of glacial runoff containing clay (rock flour). Looking down towards Memurubu one can even see the river Muru coloring the water.

The river is often used for recreational kayaking. There being no road access, however, boaters must carry their kayaks up to the river. Memurubu itself is a popular starting point for hikers wishing to travel across Besseggen.

== See also ==
- List of rivers in Norway
