= Julius Hensel =

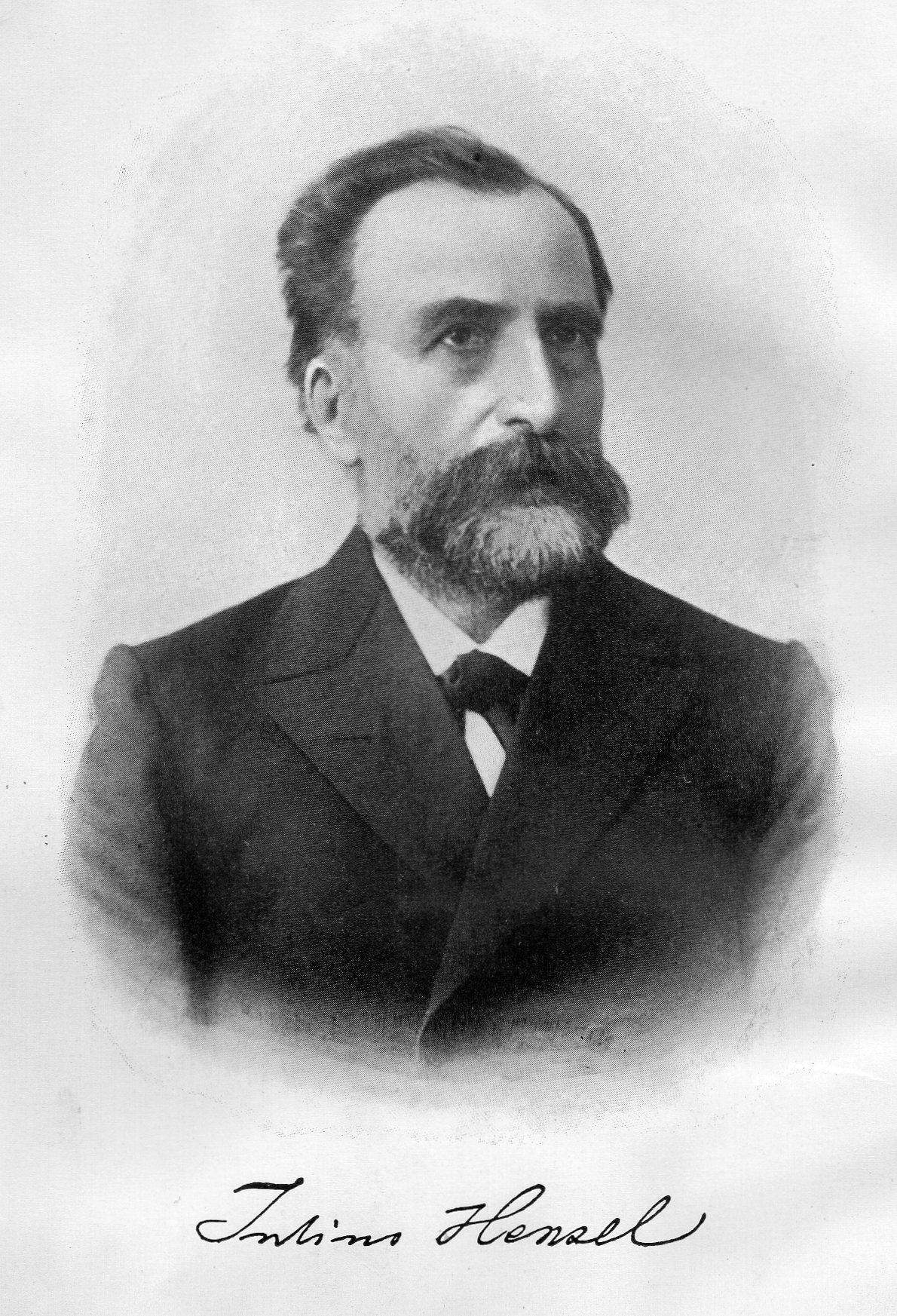
Julius Hensel

Julius Hensel (born 11 July 1833 in Küstrin; died probably 1903 in Berlin ) was a German agricultural and physiological chemist or pharmacist, who later qualified as a doctor of medicine. Hensel was the inventor of "stone meal" manure.

== Biography ==
Hensel created a mineral field fertilization with rock flour. He invented the "stone meal" manure from grinding stones in his garden. He stated that his technique could create bread from the stones and unlock "inexhaustible nutritive forces [...] stored up in the rocks, the air and the water."

He published Macrobiotic in 1882; he suggested that the underlying cause of all disease is a lack of mineral substances which are essential to the functioning of the body's cells. As he travelled he studied the minerals of the country and recorded any health problems more common in the area. His widely-read work Macrobiotic rejected the germ theory of disease and promoted the view that poor chemical composition of the blood causes disease.

A contemporary of Wilhelm Heinrich Schüßler (sometimes written Schuessler), Hensel also proposed tritrated mineral substances to treat illness, but not diluted to the extent proposed by Hahnemann's homeopathy and made a large number of enemies in opposing many aspects of both established medical opinion of the day and some of the newer ideas, from vaccination to homeopathy.

== Selected publications ==
- 1881 "Über causalmechanische Entstehung von Organismen" (under the pseudonym "pilgrim").
- 1885 "Life - its foundations, and the means of its conservation“. ISBN 978-1-4461-3277-7
- 1892 Macrobiotic; Or, Our Diseases and Our Remedies ISBN 978-1-4457-7900-3
- 1894 Bread from Stones ISBN 978-3-86858-343-4
- 1894 Physiological Bread
- 1967 Life: Its Foundation and the Means for Its Preservation

== Literature ==
- Sampson Morgan: Clean Culture: The new soil science. Tri-State-Press. 1996. ISBN 978-0787310059
