= Rock butter =

Soft mineral substance

Rock butter (also known as stone butter) is a soft mineral substance found oozing from alum slates.

It consists of native alum mixed with clay and oxide of iron, usually in soft masses of a yellowish white colour with translucent edges, occurring in cavities and fissures in argillaceous slate.

This substance hardens when exposed to air, but softens if the air is humid enough. The texture is sometimes described as "greasy".

It was referred to as "rock butter" in English as early as 1816.

It has been recorded in various locations around the world, including Hurley and Paisley in Scotland; Bornholm, Denmark; Bad Muskau, Germany; and along the Yenisey in Siberia. An 1837 article noted that at the "Kiffhäusen" stone quarries in Germany, the workmen called it steinbutter and ate it spread on bread.

There have been reports of people eating rock butter in various parts of the world, including Siberia, Germany, and Austria.

== See also ==
- Rock flour
