= Bessheim =

Mountain lodge in Innlandet, Norway

Coordinates: 61°30′53″N 8°51′12″E

Bessheim is a mountain lodge in Sjodalen in Vågå Municipality, Innlandet county, Norway. It is situated 964 metres (3,163 ft) above sea level, right next to the lake Øvre Sjodalsvatnet on the mountain passage between Valdres and Gudbrandsdalen (Riksveg 51 over Valdresflya). Bessheim consists of 30 buildings and has 150 beds and its own power generator. In addition to the lodge, which has 65 beds and a dining hall with room for 130 guests, there are cabins, apartments, and a campground.

== History ==
Originally Bessheim was a seter (summer farm) for the farm Nordigard Storvik and started receiving tourists at the end of the 1800s. The original seter house is still part of the lodge.

Kari Lund and Ragnhild Sjurgard are the current hosts at Bessheim and took over the management of the lodge in November 2004 from their grandparents Kari and Knut Lund who ran the lodge for 50 years. The mountain lodge has been in the family since its inception and has run the lodge without interruption over five generations.
