= Besseggen =

Mountain ridge in Innlandet, Norway

- Besseggi (unofficial)
- Interactive map of the mountain

Highest point
- Elevation: 1,634 m (5,361 ft)
- Coordinates: 61°30′15″N 8°43′55″E

Geography
- Location: Innlandet, Norway
- Parent range: Jotunheimen
- Topo map: 1618 III Glittertinden

Besseggen is a mountain ridge in Vågå Municipality in Innlandet county, Norway. The 1,634-metre (5,361 ft) tall mountain ridge is located in the Jotunheimen mountains within Jotunheimen National Park. The mountain sits about 46 kilometres (29 mi) southwest of the village of Vågåmo and about 30 kilometres (19 mi) northwest of the village of Beitostølen. The mountain ridge is surrounded by several other notable mountains including Veslfjellet to the east and Besshøe to the northwest. The ridge runs between the lakes Gjende and Bessvatnet.

The walk over Besseggen is one of the most popular mountain hikes in Norway. About 30,000 people walk this trip each year. The route over Besseggen starts at Gjendesheim, up to the trails highest point, Veslfjellet (at 1,743 metres (5,719 ft)), down Besseggen, further over the relatively flat area Bandet (at the foot of Besshøe), and ends at Memurubu, where one may take the regularly scheduled ferry route back to Gjendesheim. Many choose to do the hike in the other direction by starting at Memurubu after first taking the ferry there from Gjendesheim. The trip is estimated to take about 5–7 hours to walk without rest stops.

From Besseggen there is a great view over the lakes Gjende and Bessvatnet. One of the unique aspects of the view is that Gjende lies almost 400 metres (1,300 ft) lower than Bessvatnet, and while Bessvatnet has a blue color typical of other lakes, Gjende has a distinct green color. The green color is the result from glacier runoff containing clay (rock flour). Looking down towards Memurubu one can see the nearby river Muru coloring the water with a light colored runoff.

== Impact of tourism ==
The large number of hikers has led to serious erosion on the trails leading to Besseggen, both from Gjendesheim and Memurubu. In 2005 the Norwegian government authorized spending of 1.2 million kr towards the restoration of the trails. The project involves placing stone plates on the trail to limit additional damage and prevent further erosion. The stone plates were flown in by helicopter from Vågå since mass harvesting of stone from Jotunheimen is illegal. The technique used to pave the trail is modeled on the methods developed for the Snowdonia National Park in Wales.

== Media gallery ==
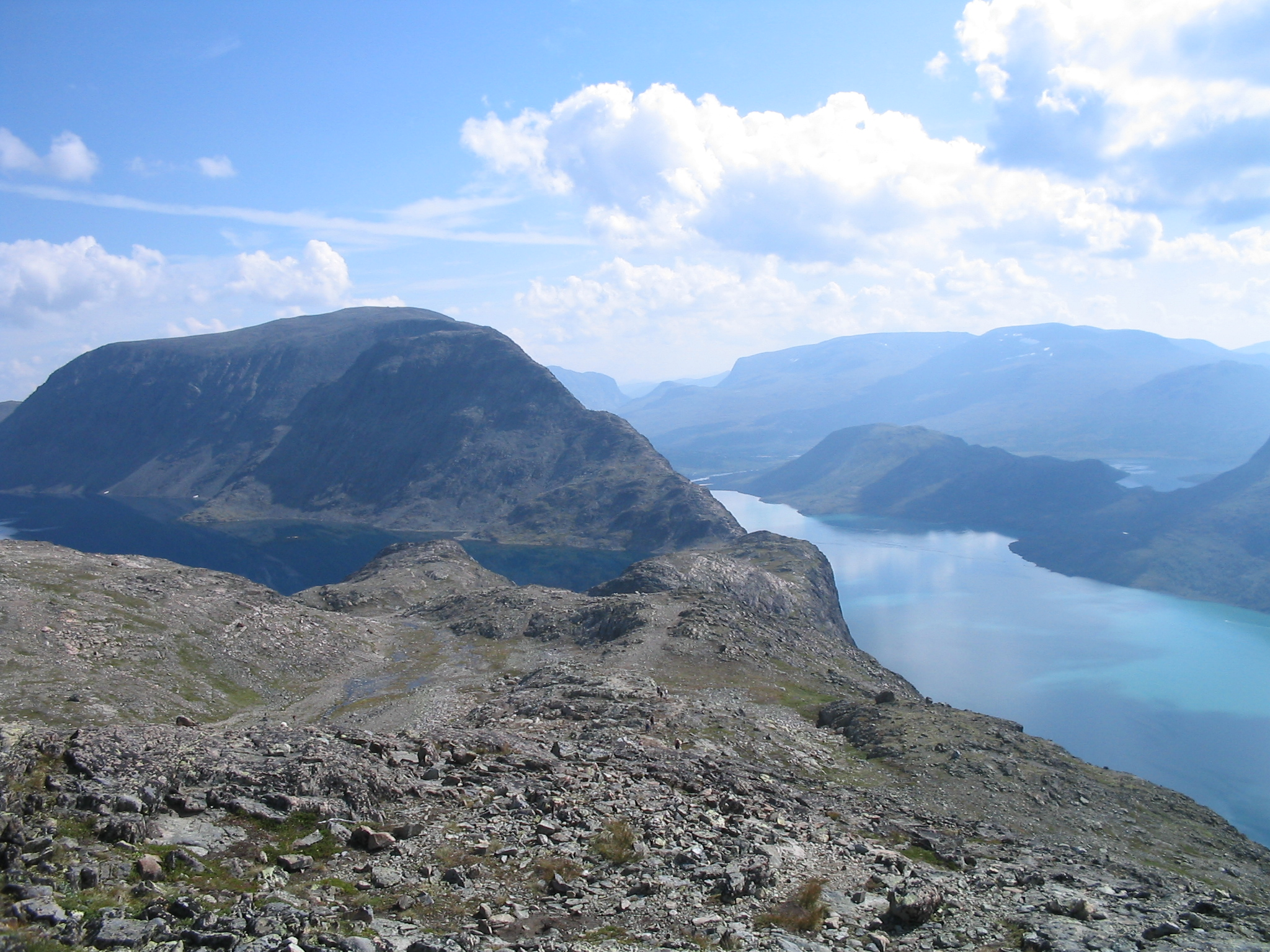
Besseggen seen towards east, with Bessvatnet on the left and Gjende on the right.

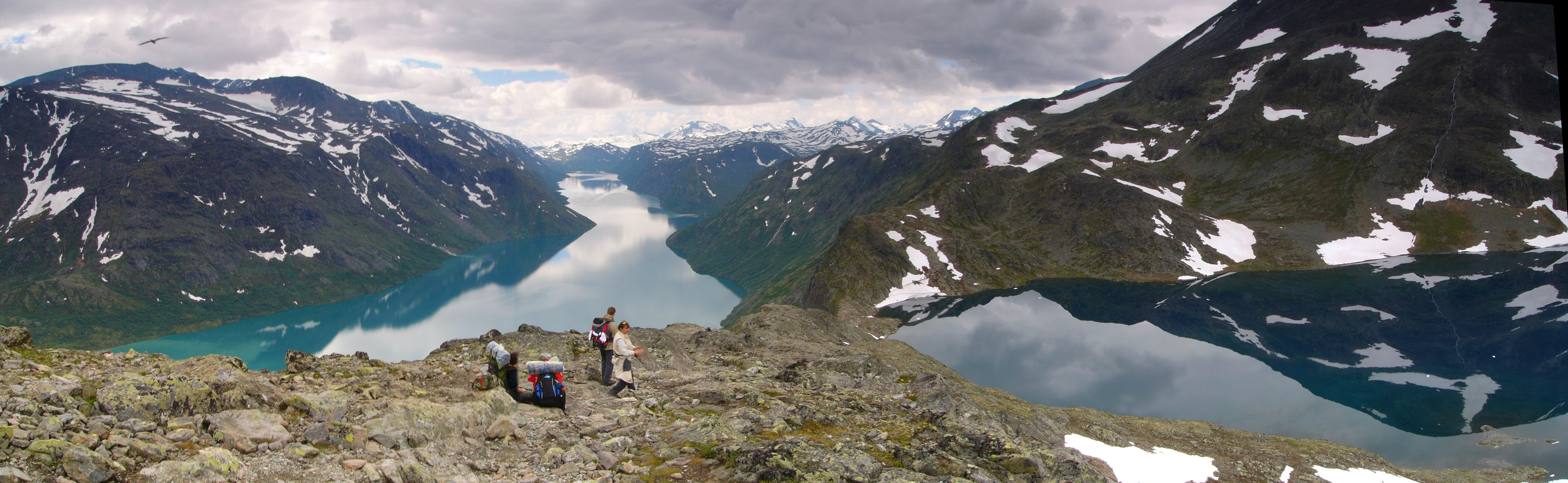
Besseggen ridge seen from east.

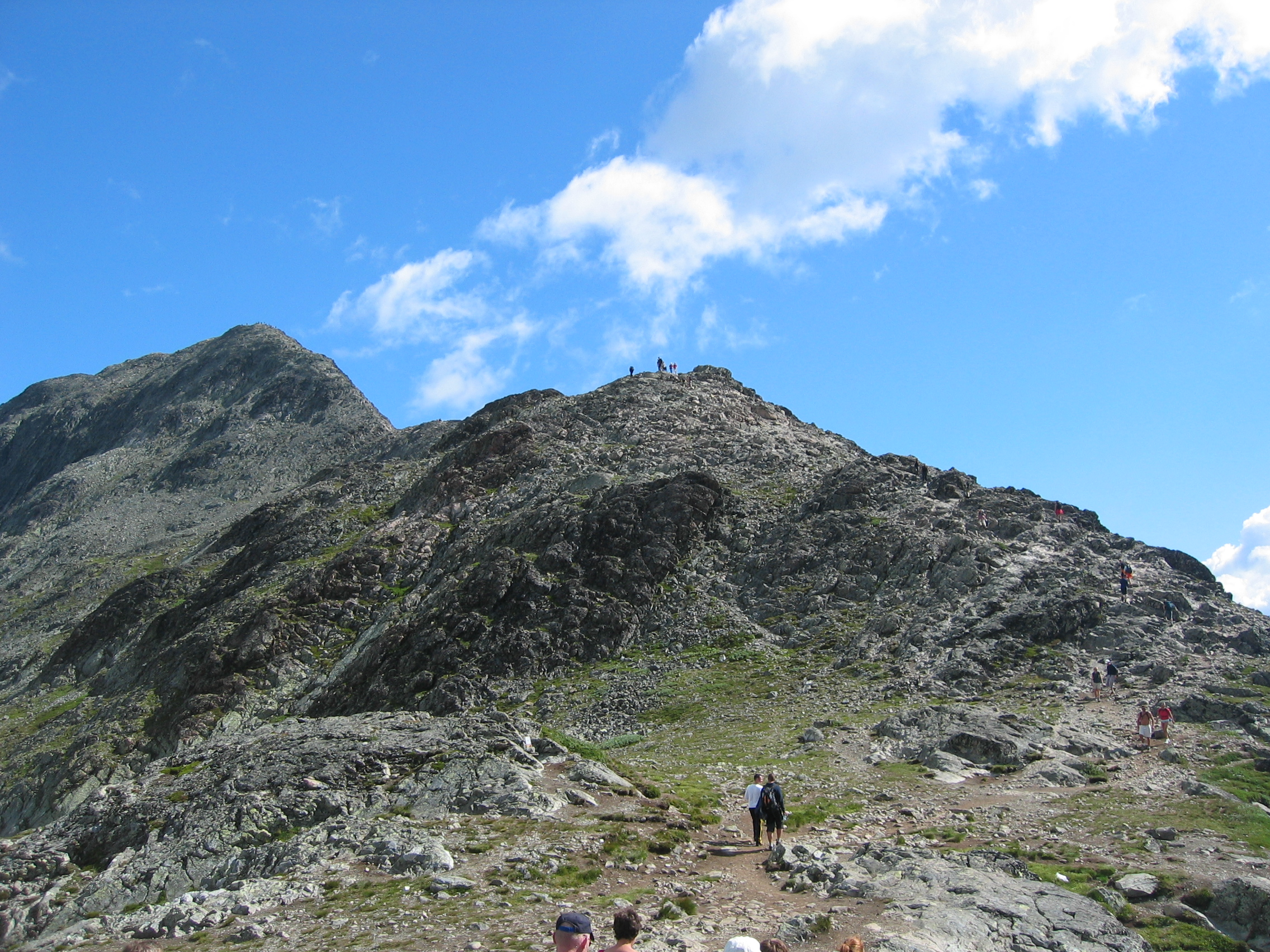
Besseggen seen towards east

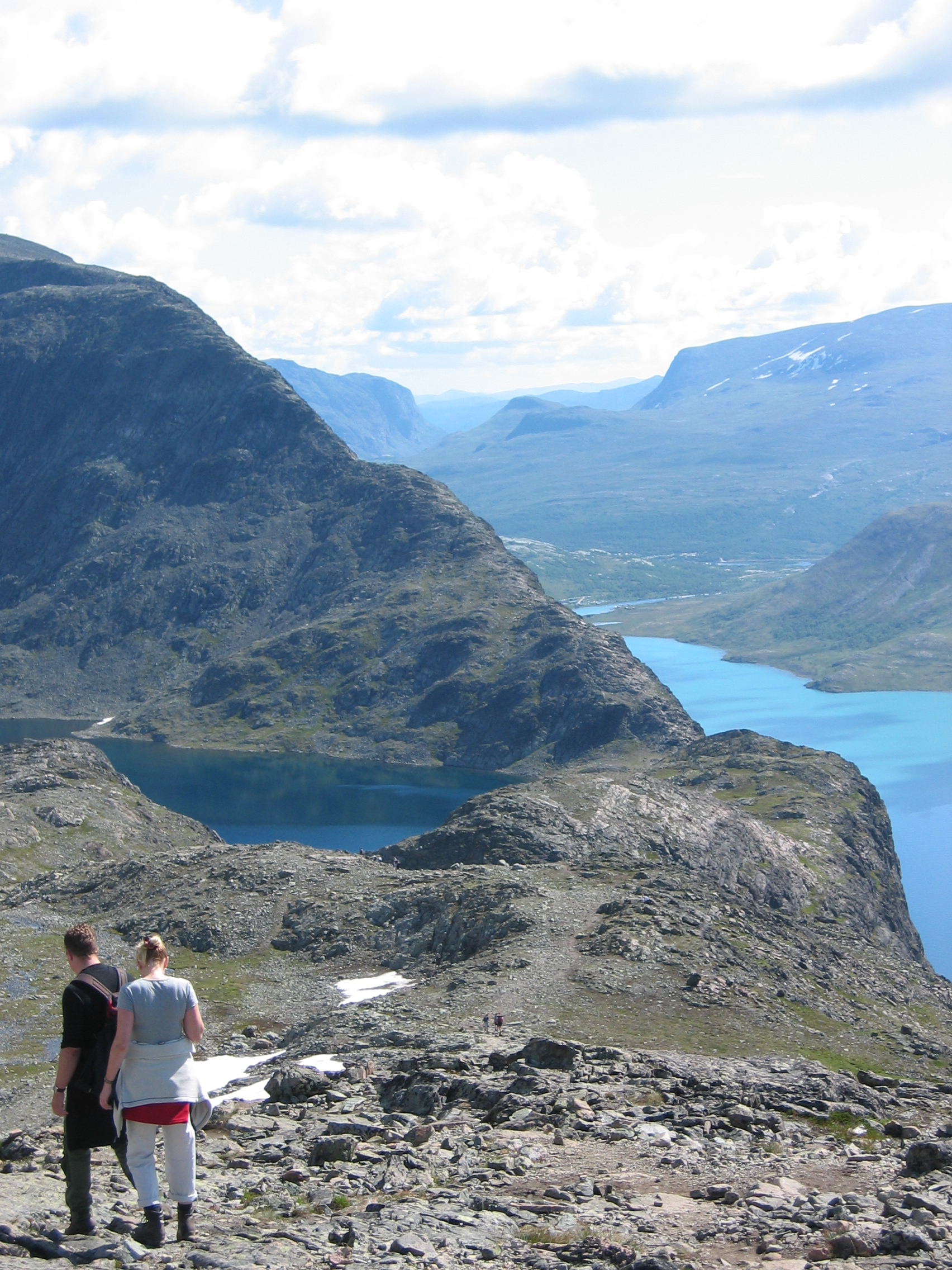
Hikers along Besseggen seen towards east, with Gjende on the right and Bessvatnet on the left

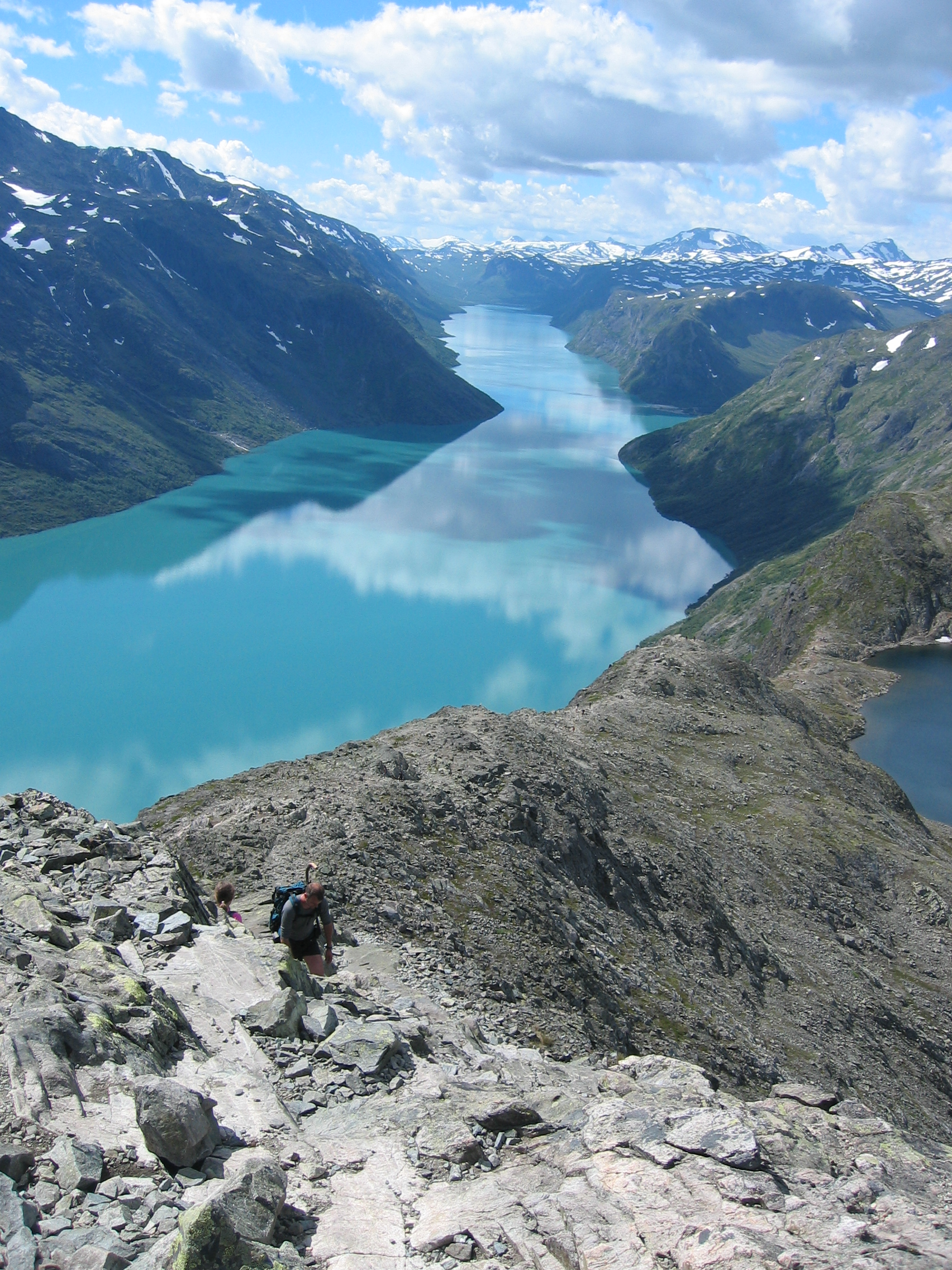
Besseggen seen towards west, with Gjende on the left and Bessvatnet on the right

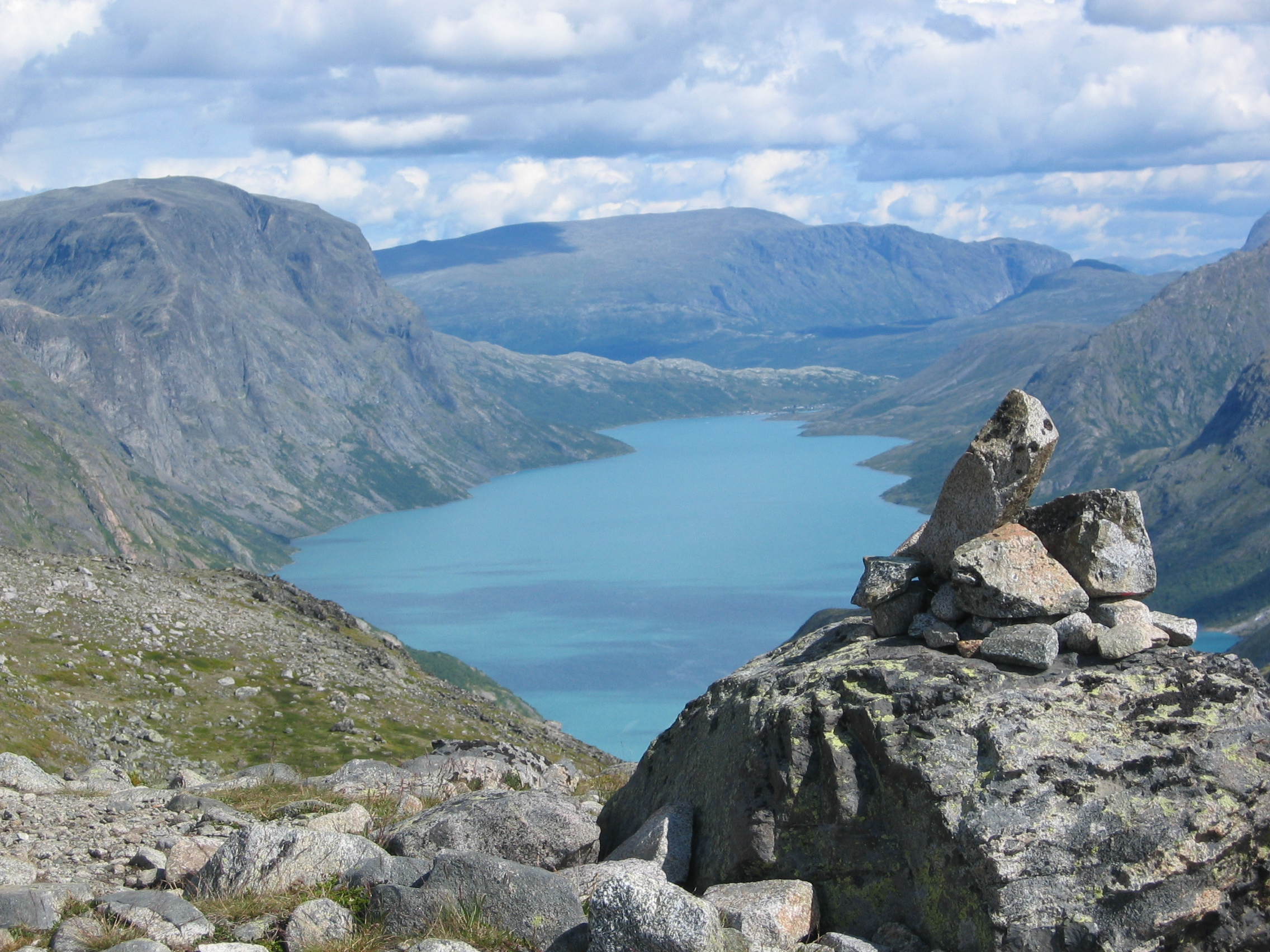
View over Gjende seen toward east, with Besseggen on the left

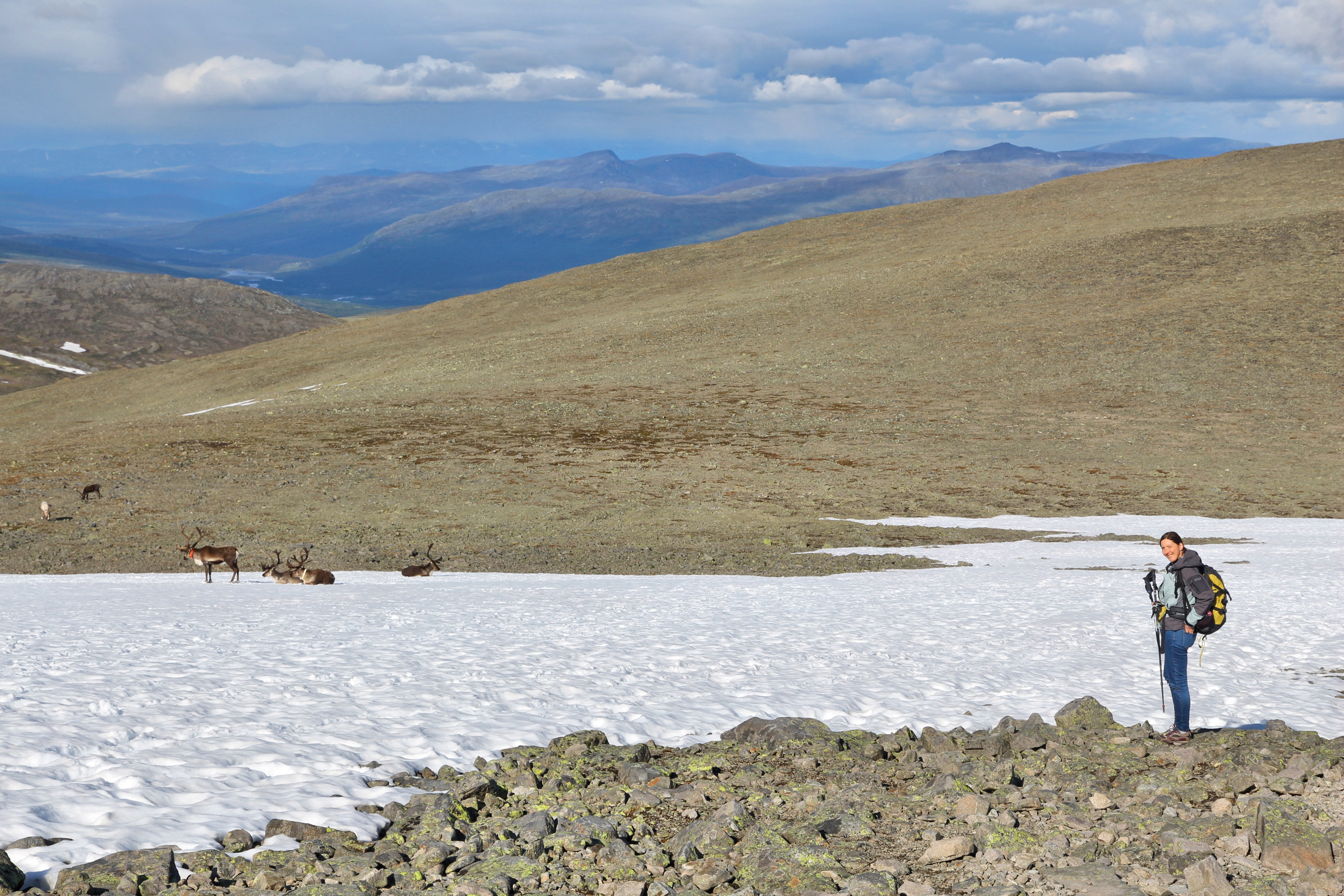
Tourist observes reindeer at Veslfjellet part of Besseggen trail.

== Competitions ==
In 1961, 1962, and 1963 a race across Besseggen called «Besseggløpet» was held during the summer. The race was organized by Norges Orienteringsforbund in cooperation with Den Norske Turistforening. The record time from 1963 is held by Reidar Andreassen who was almost four and a half minutes ahead of the next finisher. The record time of 1 hour 16 minutes and 48 seconds still holds today. The women's record, set in 1963, is held by Valborg Østberg from Gjøvik with a time of 1 hour 39 minutes and 47 seconds. She was a 32 year old housewife and mother of two kids and the Dagbladet newspaper said that she "ran like a goat over Besseggen".

== In literature ==
Besseggen is known from act 1, scene 1 of Henrik Ibsens play Peer Gynt. Peer tries to convince his mother, Åse, that he has ridden over Gjendineggen, now known as Besseggen, on a reindeer bull.

Have you ever Been upon the ridge of Gendin? Fully half a mile it stretches, At the top as sheer and narrow As a scythe-blade. Looking downward Past the slopes and past the glaciers, Past the grey ravines and gullies Either side you see the water Wrapped in dark and gloomy slumber Half a mile at least beneath you. Right along it he and I Clove our passage through the air. Never rode I such a steed! Far ahead the peaks were sparkling As we rushed along. Beneath us In the void the dusky eagles Fell away like motes in sunshine; You could see the ice-floes breaking On the banks, yet hear no murmur. But the sprites that turn us dizzy Danced and sang and circled round us I could hear and seemed to see them!

— Henrik Ibsen, Act 1 Scene 1, Peer Gynt (1867)

Besseggen is also described in the poem «Besseggen» by Ragnvald Skrede.

== Name ==
The mountain ridge is named after Bessvatnet, the last element is the finite form off egg which means 'edge'. In the local dialect, the form is Besseggje. The Bokmål written form of the name is Besseggen and the Nynorsk written form is Besseggi.

== See also ==
- List of mountains of Norway by height
