= Sjoa =

River in Innlandet, Norway

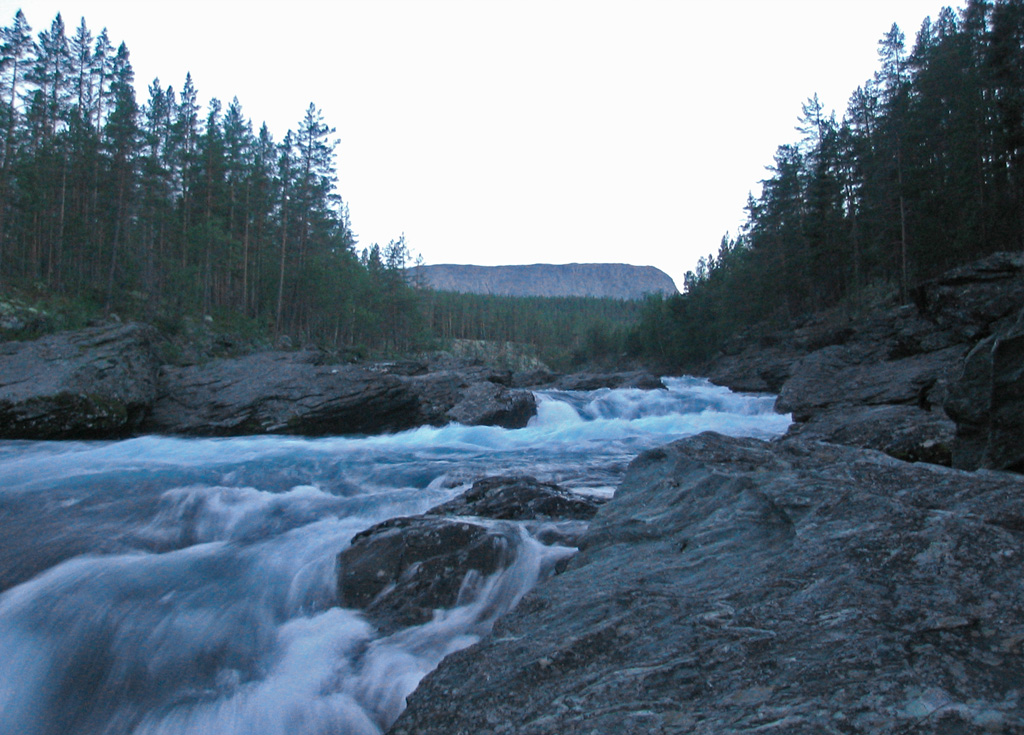
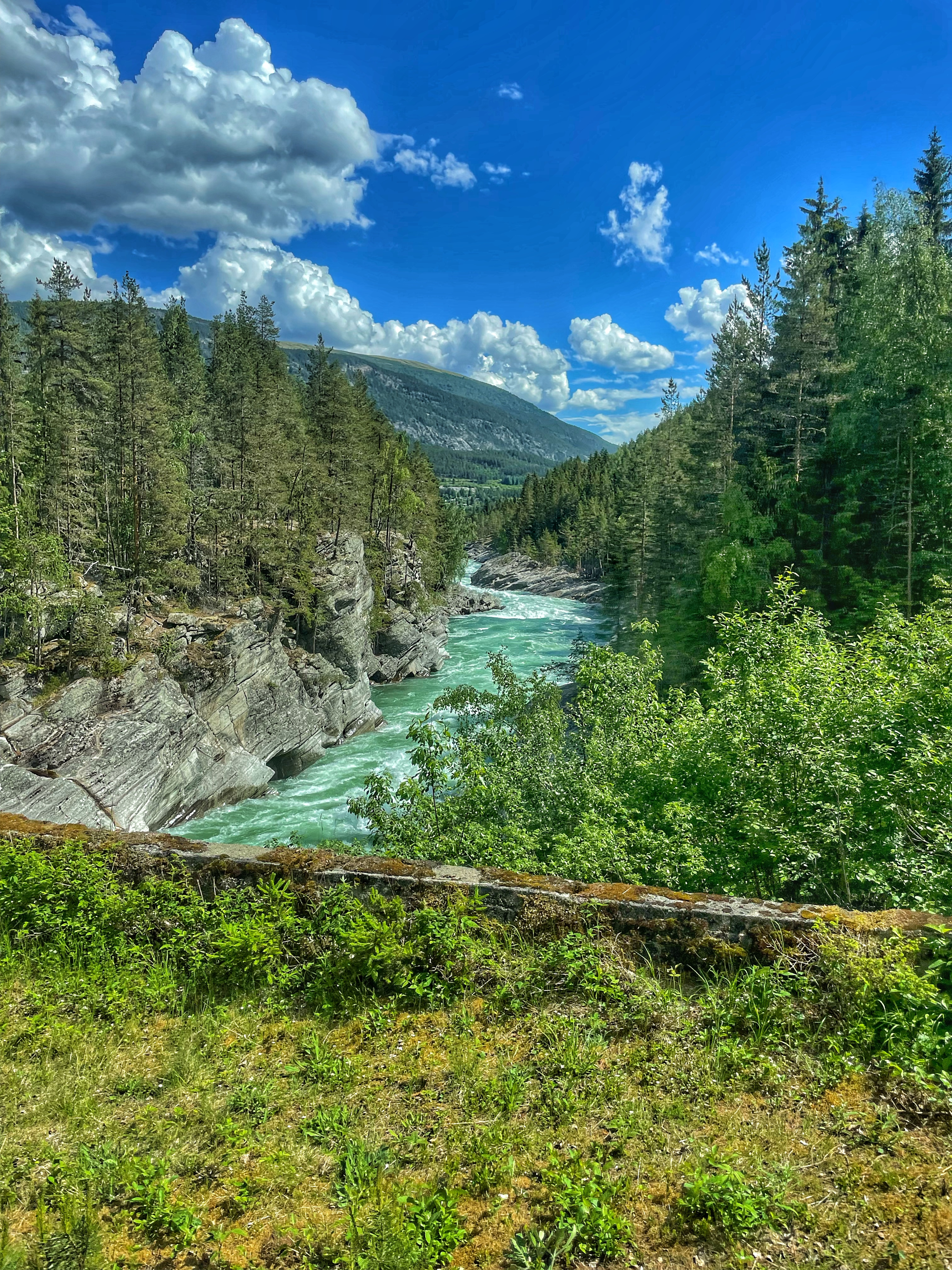
- View of the river (2005); Credit: TaHan The river during summer.

Location
- Country: Norway
- County: Innlandet
- Municipalities: Vågå Municipality and Sel Municipality

Physical characteristics
- Source: Gjende lake
  - location: Gjendesheim, Vågå Municipality
  - coordinates: 61.4949763°N 8.8080739°E
  - elevation: 985 metres (3,232 ft)
- Mouth: Gudbrandsdalslågen
  - location: Sjoa, Sel Municipality
  - coordinates: 61.67964345°N 9.53443765°E
  - elevation: 270 metres (890 ft)
- Length: 98 km (61 mi)
- Basin size: 1,527 km^{2} (590 sq mi)
- Discharge
  - average: 34.4 m^{3}/s (1,210 cu ft/s)

Sjoa is a river in Innlandet county, Norway. The 98-kilometre (61 mi) long river runs through Vågå Municipality and Sel Municipality and it provides the outlet from lake Gjende at Gjendesheim in the Jotunheimen mountains of Norway's Jotunheim National Park. The river flows eastward through the Sjodalen valley and Heidal valley into the Gudbrandsdalslågen river at the village of Sjoa.

South of the village of Randsverk, the river flows through Ridderspranget which is a ravine named after a Norwegian myth.

== Rafting, kayaking and fishing ==
The river is used for kayaking, rafting and fishing. Thirteen deaths have occurred in the river, from 1989 to 2010. This includes four deaths involving a group of tourists in various inflatable "catarafts", on 24 July 2010 (a national newspaper claimed that at that time the level of the river was 10 centimetres (4 in) above a safe level for rafting).

There are several companies offering rafting, kayaking, riverboarding and other activities in Sjoa and the surrounding area. Some parts of the river are impossible to raft. Some parts are blocked by large rocks which the river flows underneath. These areas are considered "death traps" by the local commercial rafting providers.
