= Gloptinden =

Mountain in Innlandet, Norway

- Interactive map of the mountain

Highest point
- Elevation: 1,678 m (5,505 ft)
- Prominence: 158 m (518 ft)
- Parent peak: Glittertinden
- Isolation: 1.2 km (0.75 mi)
- Coordinates: 61°31′22″N 8°38′27″E

Geography
- Location: Innlandet, Norway
- Parent range: Jotunheimen
- Topo map: 1618 III Glittertinden

Gloptinden is a mountain in Vågå Municipality in Innlandet county, Norway. The 1,678-metre (5,505 ft) tall mountain is located in the Jotunheimen mountains within Jotunheimen National Park. The mountain sits about 50 kilometres (31 mi) southwest of the village of Vågåmo and about 35 kilometres (22 mi) northwest of the village of Beitostølen. The mountain is surrounded by several other notable mountains including Kollhøin to the northeast, Besshø to the east, Surtningssue to the northwest, and Styggehøi to the north.

== See also ==
- List of mountains of Norway by height
