= Bessvatnet =

Lake in Innlandet, Norway

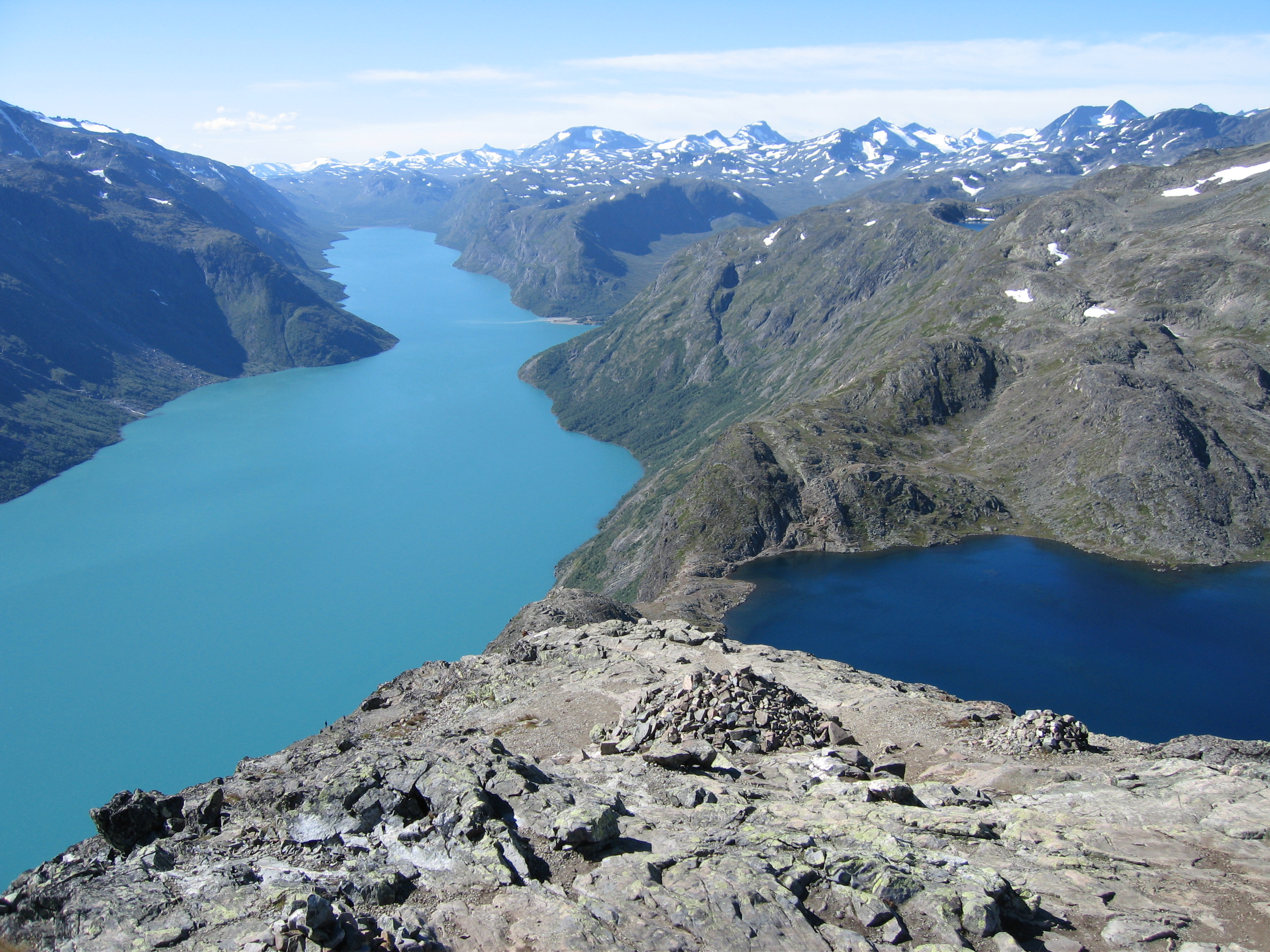
- Bessvatnet to the right. Gjende is the lake to the left. Seen from the Besseggen ridge.
- Interactive map of the lake
- Location: Vågå Municipality, Innlandet
- Coordinates: 61°31′23″N 8°46′32″E
- Basin countries: Norway
- Max. length: 6 kilometres (3.7 mi)
- Max. width: 1 kilometre (0.62 mi)
- Surface area: 4.6953 km^{2} (1.8129 sq mi)
- Max. depth: 102 metres (335 ft)
- Shore length^{1}: 13.31 kilometres (8.27 mi)
- Surface elevation: 1,373 metres (4,505 ft)
- References: NVE
- ^{1} Shore length is not a well-defined measure.

Bessvatnet is a glacial lake in Vågå Municipality in Innlandet county, Norway. The 4.7-square-kilometre (1.8 sq mi) lake is located in the Jotunheimen mountain range and also inside the Jotunheimen National Park. The lake lies just east of the mountain Besshø. The lake Bessvatnet is known to everyone that has hiked the Besseggen ridge, as the narrow mountain ridge runs between the southern end of the dark blue lake Bessvatnet on one side of the ridge and the green lake Gjende lies below the other side of the ridge.

== Name ==
Bessvatnet is named after the river Bessa. The name of the river is derived from Old Norse word bersi which means 'bear' thus the river name means 'Bear river'. The last element is the finite form of vatn which means 'water' or 'lake'.

== See also ==
- List of lakes in Norway
- Media related to Bessvatnet at Wikimedia Commons
