= Rock flour =

Glacier-generated sediment

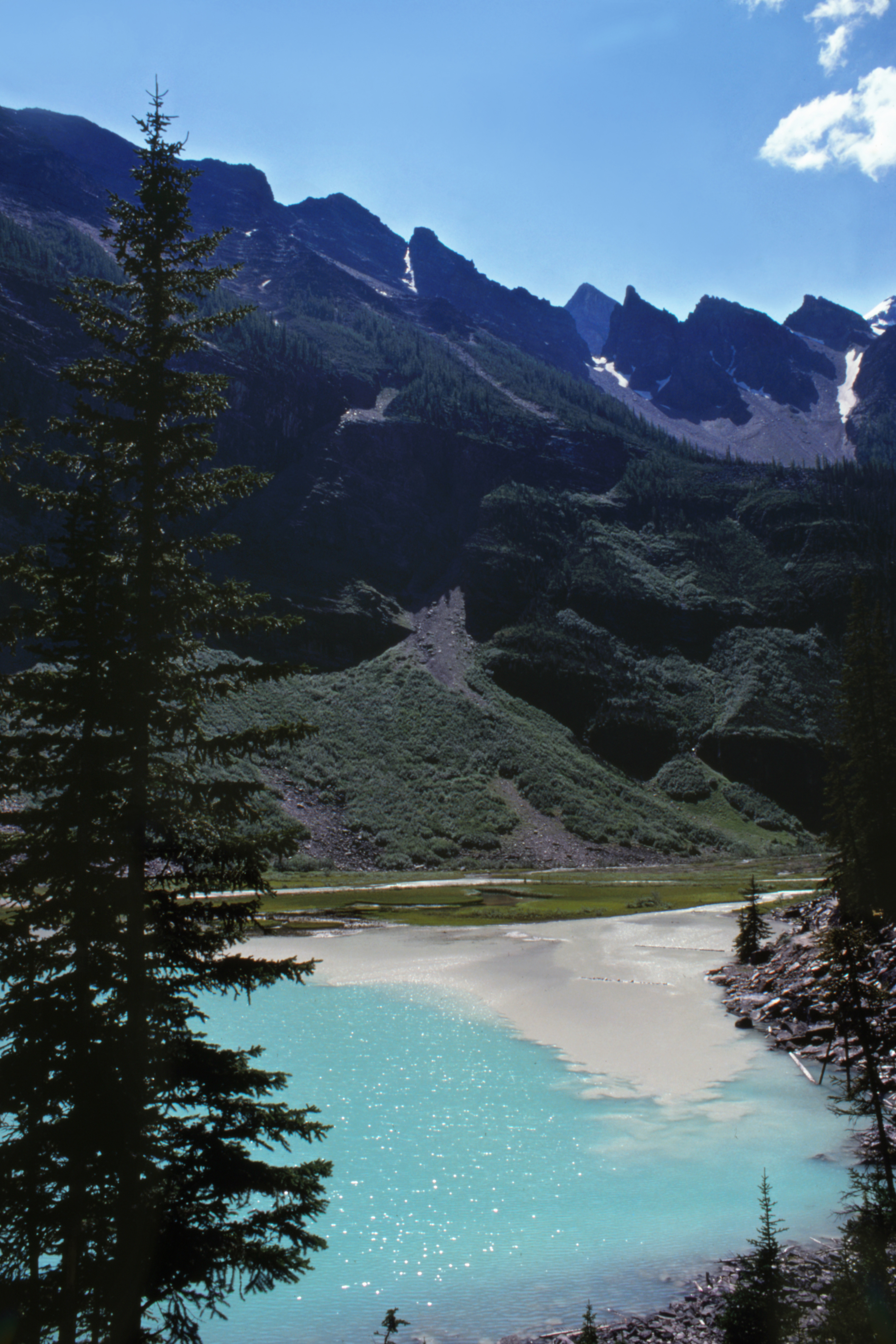
Rock flour from glacial melt enters Lake Louise, Canada

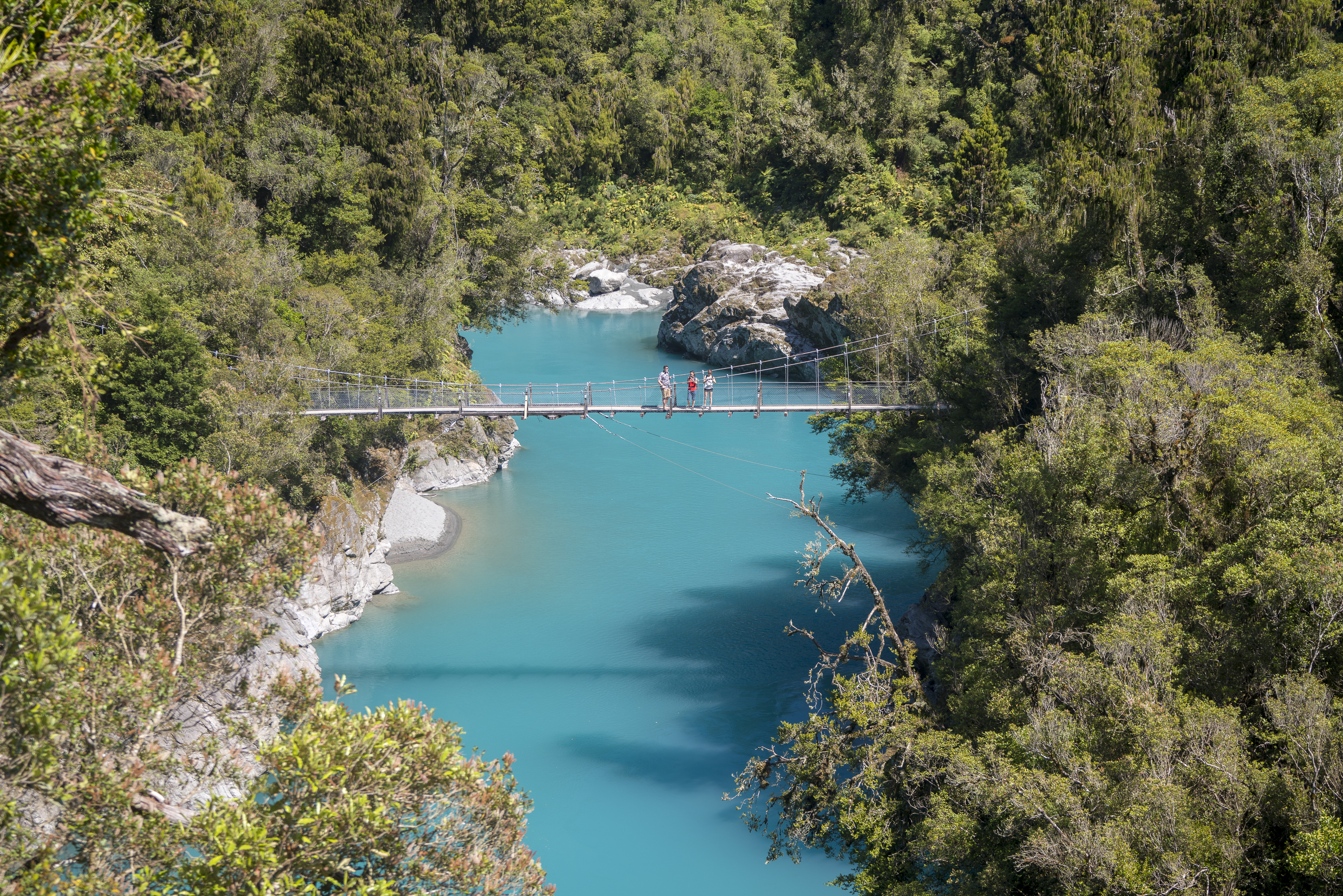
Rock flour intensifies the water's hue at Hokitika Gorge on the West Coast of New Zealand

Rock flour, or glacial flour, consists of fine-grained, silt-sized particles of rock, generated by mechanical grinding of bedrock by glacial erosion or by artificial grinding to a similar size. Because the material is very small, it becomes suspended in meltwater, clouding it, so that it is sometimes known as glacial milk.

When the sediments enter a river, they turn it grey, light brown, iridescent blue-green, or milky white. If the river flows into a glacial lake, the lake may appear turquoise in colour as a result. When appearing as any shade of blue, the colour is most commonly caused by the Tyndall effect, with the particular hue determined by suspended particle size.

When flows of the flour are extensive, a distinct layer of a different colour flows into the lake and begins to dissipate and settle as the flow extends from the increase in water flow from the glacier during snow melts and heavy rain periods. Examples of this phenomenon may be seen at Lake Pukaki and Lake Tekapo in New Zealand, Lake Louise, Moraine Lake, Emerald Lake, and Peyto Lake in Canada, Gjende lake in Norway, and several lakes (among others, Nordenskjöld and Pehoé) in Chile's Torres del Paine National Park, and many lakes in the Cascade Range of Washington State (including Diablo Lake, Gorge Lake, and Blanca Lake).

== Formation ==
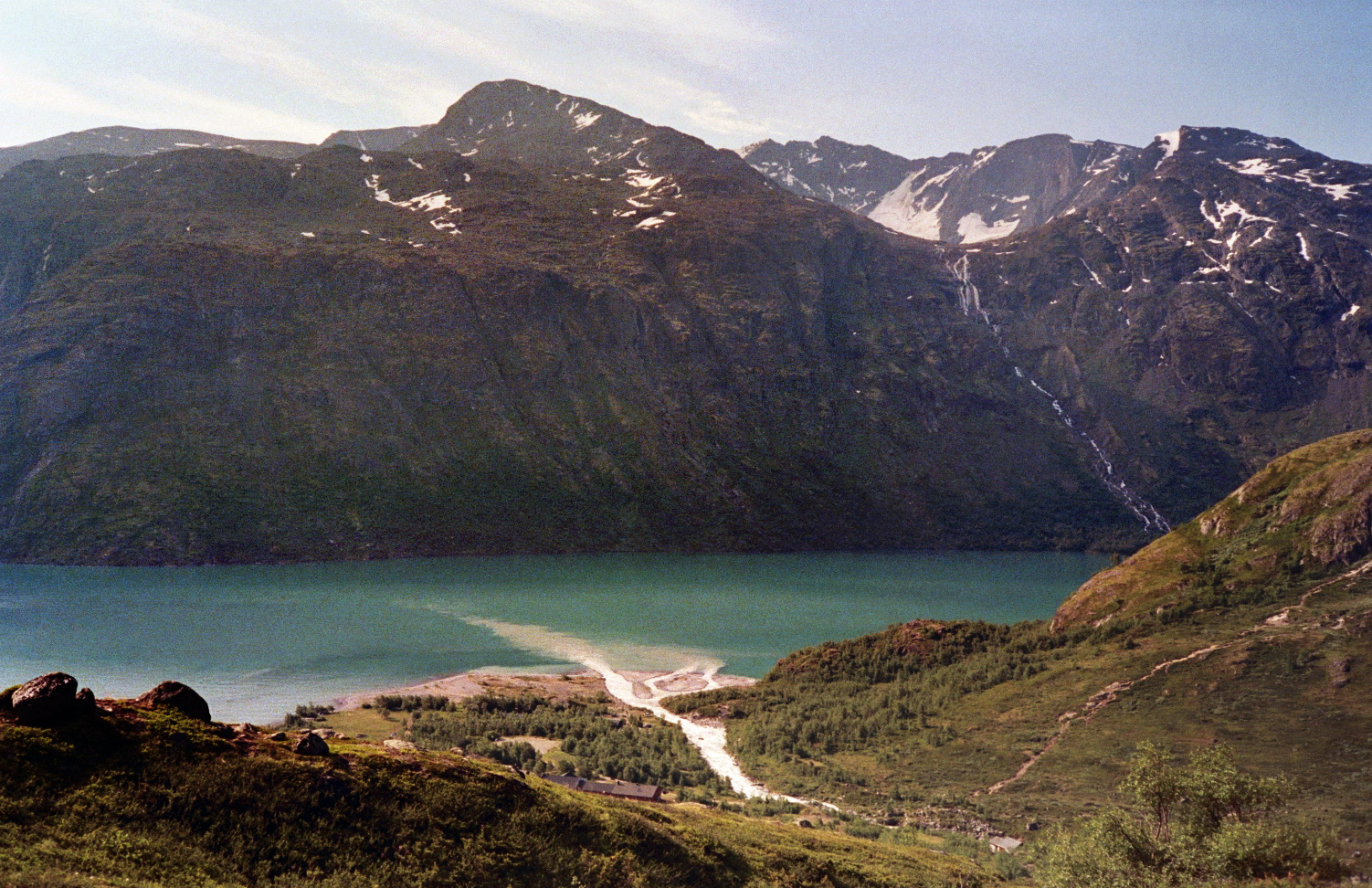
Muru river pours rock flour into Gjende lake, Norway

Typically, natural rock flour is formed during glacial migration, where the glacier grinds against the sides and bottom of the rock beneath it, but also is produced by freeze-and-thaw action, where the act of water freezing and expanding in cracks helps break up rock formations. Multiple cycles create a greater amount.

Although clay-sized, the flour particles are not clay minerals but typically ground-up quartz and feldspar. Rock flour is carried out from the system via meltwater streams, where the particles travel in suspension. Rock flour particles may travel great distances either suspended in water or carried by the wind, in the latter case forming deposits called loess.

== Agricultural and silvicultural use ==
Rock flour, artificial or natural, is a source of plant micronutrients (minerals trace elements) widely used in organic farming practices as a soil conditioner. Synonyms in this case include rock dust, rock powders, rock minerals, and mineral fines.

The igneous rocks basalt and granite often contain the highest mineral content, whereas limestone, considered inferior in this consideration, is often deficient in the majority of essential macro-compounds, trace elements, and micronutrients.

=== Background ===
Soil remineralization (in the sense of re-incorporating minerals, different from remineralisation in biogeochemistry) creates fertile soils by returning minerals to the soil which have been lost by erosion, leaching, and or over-farming. It functions the same way that the Earth does: during an Ice Age, glaciers crush rock onto the Earth's soil mantle, and winds blow the dust in the form of loess all over the globe. Volcanoes erupt, spewing forth minerals from deep within the Earth, and rushing rivers form mineral-rich alluvial deposits.

Rock dust is added to soil to improve fertility and has been tested since 1993 at the Sustainable Ecological Earth Regeneration Centre (SEER Centre) in Straloch, near Pitlochry, in Perth and Kinross, Scotland. Further testing has been undertaken by James Cook University, Townsville, Far North Queensland.

=== History ===
Thomas J. Goreau who wrote the book Geotherapy believed that mafic/ultra-mafic rock flour had a powerful effect in restoring trace minerals to soils, which increases the health and vigour of the Microorganism, Plantae, Animalia pathway and also sequesters carbon. An early experimenter was the German miller, Julius Hensel, author of Bread from Stones, who reported successful results with steinmehl (stonemeal) in the 1890s. His ideas were not taken up due to technical limitations and, according to proponents of his method, because of opposition from the champions of conventional fertilisers.

John D. Hamaker argued that widespread remineralization of soils with rock dust would be necessary to reverse soil depletion by current agriculture and forestry practice. While this originally was an alternative concept, increasing mainstream research has been devoted to soil amendment and other benefits of rock flour application: for instance, a pilot project on the use of glacial rock, granite and basaltic fines by the U.S. Department of Agriculture exists at the Henry A. Wallace Beltsville Agricultural Research Center. The SEER Centre in Scotland is a leading source of information on the use of rock dusts and mineral fines. The Soil Remineralization Forum was established with sponsorship from the Scottish Environment Protection Agency and has commissioned a portfolio of research into the benefits of using mineral fines. The Forum provides an interface among research, environmentalists, and industry.

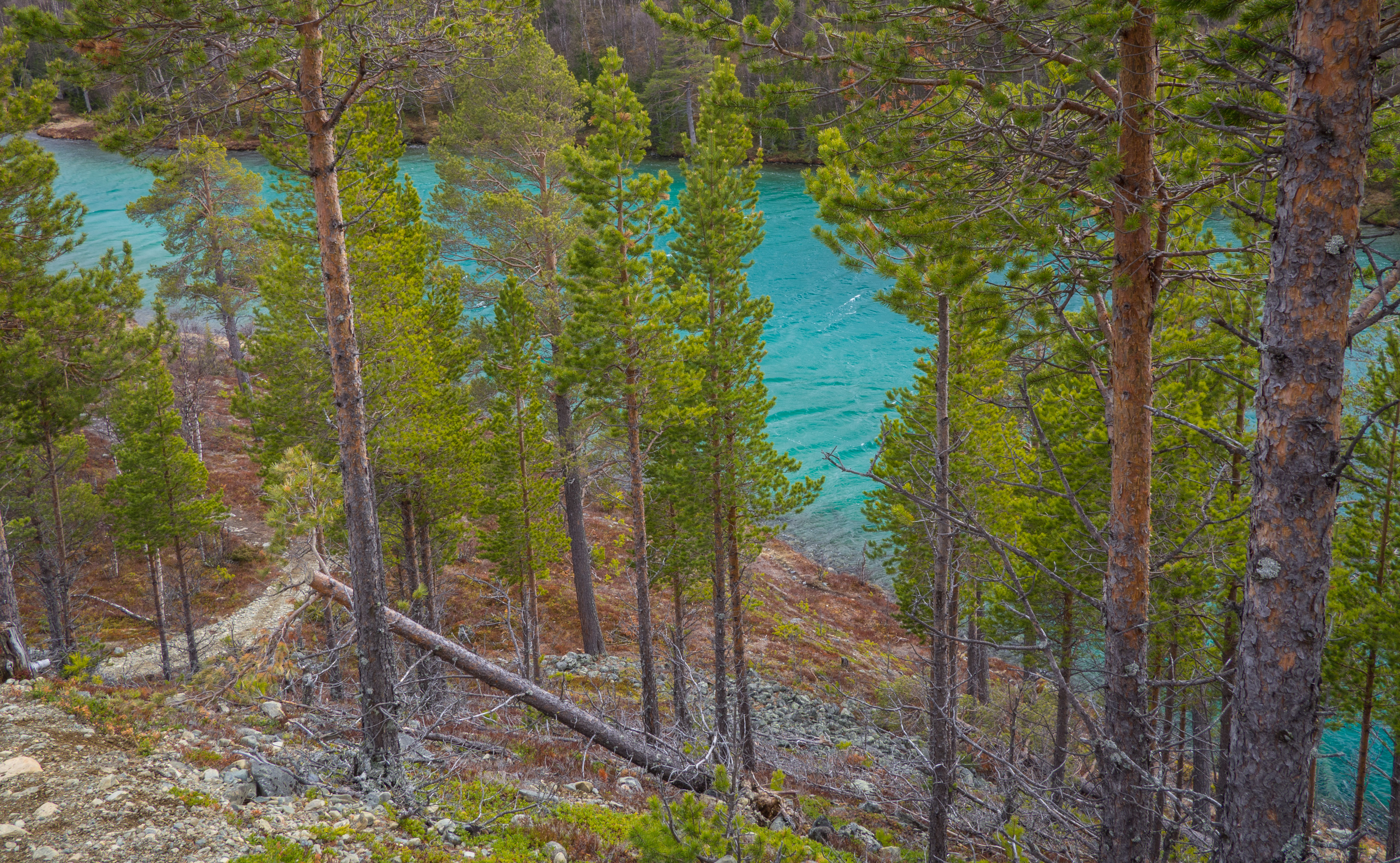
Östra Blanktjärn Lake in Vålådalen Nature Reserve, Sweden

=== Research ===
SEER's research claims that the benefits of adding rockdust to soil include increased moisture-holding properties in the soil, improved cation exchange capacity and better soil structure and drainage. Rockdust also provides calcium, iron, magnesium, phosphorus and potassium, plus trace elements and micronutrients. By replacing these leached minerals, soil health is increased and that this produces healthier plants.

A 2022 study found that basalt dust improved soil fertility and increased available phosphorus, potassium, calcium and magnesium levels compared to soil without the basalt dust in a period of several months.

Greenland rock flour increased yields from corn fields in Ghana and barley fields by 30–50%. Melting ice is depositing one billion tons of rock flour annually; one ton can direct air capture 250 kilograms (550 lb) of carbon.

In forestry, rock flour can gradually increase the pH and buffering status of soils via its slow-release liming properties and increase tree radial growth if nitrogen is not deficient, even up to 34 years after the application. Furthermore, rock flour amended in the planting pits of tree saplings can increase sapling survival and growth when reforesting acidified forest soils.

=== Composition ===
Element	Unit	
calcium	%w/w	6.44
iron	%w/w	10.5
magnesium	%w/w	6.54
sulfur	%w/w	0.21
potassium	%w/w	1.25
phosphorus	mg/kg	3030
cobalt	mg/kg	35
copper	mg/kg	43
manganese	mg/kg	790
molybdenum	mg/kg	<5
zinc	mg/kg	92
silicon	%w/w	21.6

Silicon is thought to be the major element effecting the strength of cell wall development. However it is the amount of available silica that has a dramatic effect on the plant strength and subsequent health. To highlight this, plants that are grown in very sandy soils, (being high in non available silica), often require a silica based fertiliser to provide available silicon. Silicon comes in silicon multi-oxide molecules (e.g. SiO_{2}, SiO_{4}, SiO_{6}, and SiO_{8}). Each molecule shape is thought to pack in different ways to allow different levels of availability.

Often phosphorus is locked in soils due to many years of application of traditional fertilisers. The use of micronutrient-rich fertiliser enables plants to access locked phosphorus.

The elements high in available 2+ valence electrons (particularly calcium, iron and magnesium) contribute to paramagnetism in soil which aids in cation exchange capacity.

The calcium and magnesium in high quality have the ability to neutralise pH in soils, in effect acting as a liming agent.

=== Application ===
Rock dust can be applied to soil by hand application, via broadcast spreader, helicopter or by fertigation. Where possible the rock dust can be worked into the ground either physically or by using water to wash in.

In some soils which display poor levels of nutrients, application rates of 10 up to 50 tonnes per hectare are required. In Australia, namely the Riverland, Riverina, Langhorne Creek, Barossa and McLaren Vale regions, rates are 3–5 tonnes per hectare. In a garden application, this might equate to 400 grams per square metre.

== See also ==
- Diatomaceous earth
- Greensand, used as a source of potassium
- Organic farming
- Organic fertilizer
- Phosphorite, also called rock phosphate
- Rock butter
- Soil conditioner
