= Gjendesheim =

Building in Vågå, Innlandet, Norway

Coordinates: 61°29′43.29″N 8°48′34.05″E

Gjendesheim Turisthytte has been a staffed lodge with Norwegian Mountain Touring Association (Norwegian: Den Norske Turistforening – DNT). It is located in the heart of the Norwegian mountains in Vågå Municipality in Innlandet county, Norway. DNT Oslo og Omegn has been the proprietor since 1878. The lodge can accommodate 170 guests in bedrooms with 1, 2, and 4 beds in four dormitories. The standard is simple; with bunks and bathroom facilities.

Gjendesheim is situated at the east end of Gjende lake, at an elevation of 1,000 metres (3,300 ft) above sea level. It is located about 2 kilometres (1.2 mi) from Maurvangen off Norwegian County Road 51.

Gjendesheim is a popular starting point for hiking over Besseggen. Hikers either take one of the ferry boats to Memurubu and hike back to Gejendesheim over Besseggen or alternatively start the hike at Gjendesheim and take the ferry boat back.

== History ==
Originally Gjendesheim was planned for construction near Leirungen which is located further up towards Valdresflya. When securing a lot proved impossible, Gjendesheim was constructed at its current location.

- 1868: The foundation of Norwegian Mountain Touring Association (DNT)
- 1873: DNTs first cairn marked path established from Memurudalen to Bessvatnet
- 1878: The opening of Gjendesheim
- 1890: The first development and restoration with new cuisine, several renovations in 1898, 1904–05, 1910–11, 1916 and 1925
- 1937: New main building and renovation of dormitories
- 1974: Installation of electricity
- 1976: New extensive renovation

=== Hosts at Gjendesheim ===
- 1878-1901: Anders Rusnes
- 1901-1920: Kari Rusnes
- 1920-1950: Ragnhild Repp
- 1950-1952: Bjørg Hult Nystrøm
- 1952-1958: Marit and Jens Skogstad
- 1959-1974: Åslaug and Nils Vole
- 1975-1977: Sonja and Olav Gaute Vole
- 1977-1980: Olav Gaute Vole
- 1980-2010: Bjørg Aaseng Vole and Olav Gaute Vole
- Since 2010: Marius Haugaløkken and Anne Katrin Taagvold
