= Gjende =

Lake in Innlandet, Norway

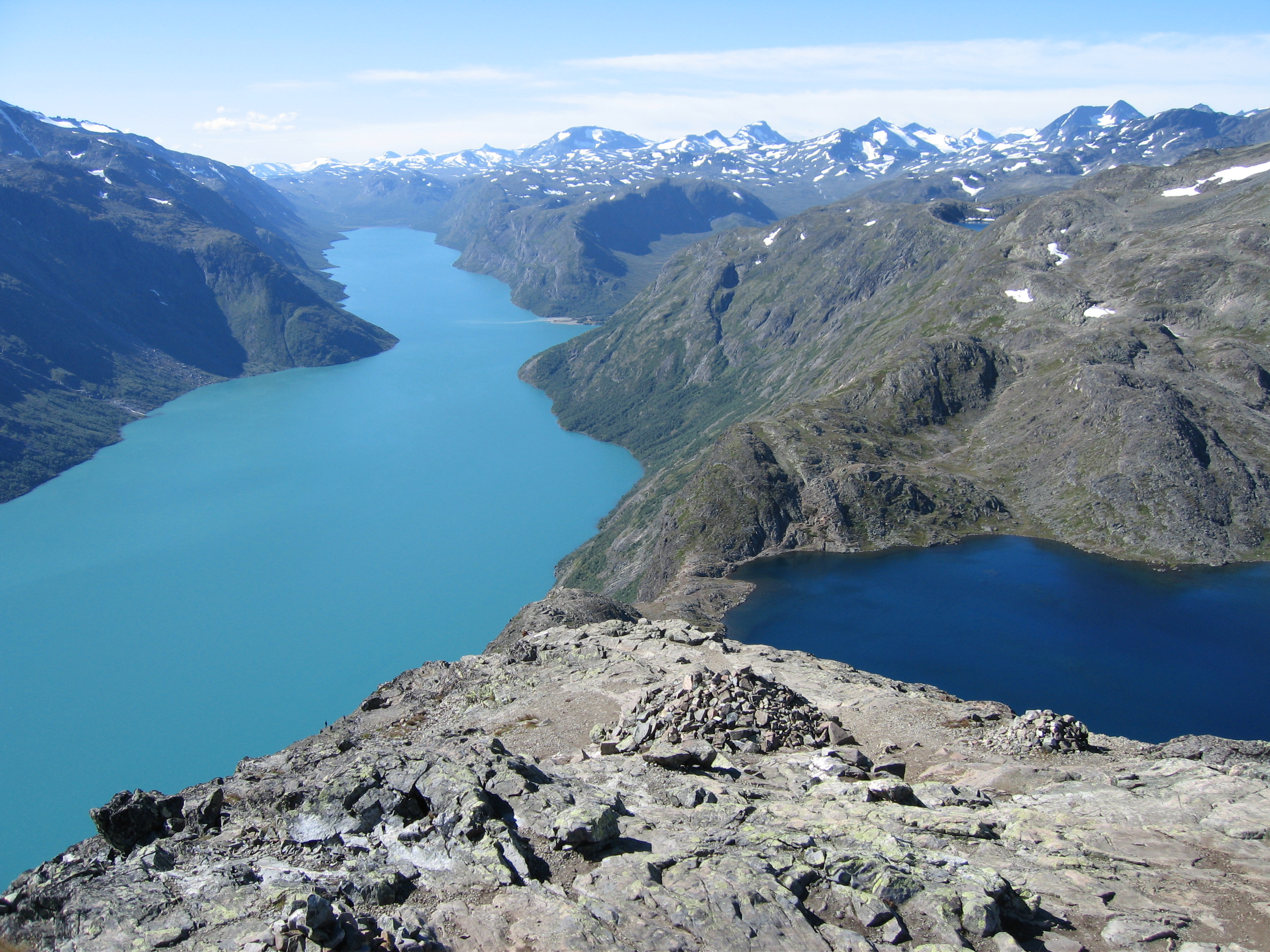
- Lake Gjende to the left, as seen from Besseggen, looking in the direction of Memurubu and Gjendebu. Lake Bessvatnet to the right.
- Interactive map of the lake
- Location: Vågå Municipality, Innlandet
- Coordinates: 61°29′22″N 08°40′48″E
- Type: glacier mountain lake
- Primary inflows: River Muru
- Primary outflows: River Sjoa
- Basin countries: Norway
- Max. length: 18 km (11 mi)
- Max. width: 1.5 km (0.93 mi)
- Surface area: 15.64 km^{2} (6.04 sq mi)
- Average depth: 64 m (210 ft)
- Max. depth: 149 m (489 ft)
- Water volume: 1 km^{3} (0.24 cu mi)
- Shore length^{1}: 40.32 km (25.05 mi)
- Surface elevation: 983.7 m (3,227 ft)
- References: NVE
- ^{1} Shore length is not a well-defined measure.

Gjende (Vang dialect form: Gjendin) is a lake in Vågå Municipality in Innlandet county, Norway. It is located in the Jotunheimen mountain range and also inside Jotunheimen National Park. The proglacial lake shows typical characteristics of glacial formation, being long and narrow, with steep walls. The lake is 18 kilometres (11 mi) in length and only 1.5 kilometres (0.93 mi) in width at the broadest point. Gjende has a characteristic light-green color resulting from the large quantity of rock flour which is discharged into the Gjende by the Muru river. The river Sjoa provides the outlet from Gjende at Gjendesheim, and flows eastward into the Gudbrandsdalslågen river.

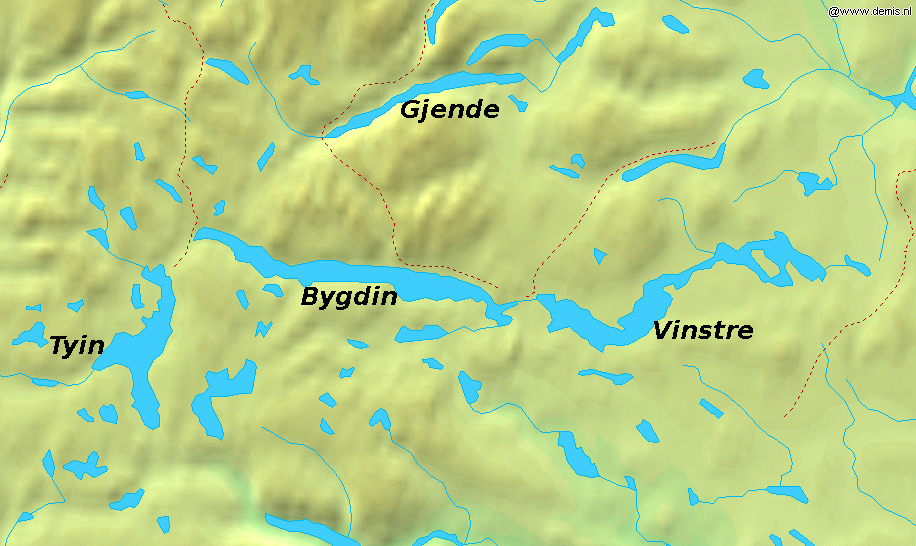
Gjende and other nearby lakes.

Gjende lies in the middle of Jotunheimen National Park and both to the north and south of the lake lie peaks with elevations reaching greater than 2,000 metres (6,600 ft). There are numerous staffed tourist cabins maintained by the Norwegian Mountain Touring Association (DNT); in the west end lies Gjendebu, on the north side lies Memurubu and on the east end lies Gjendesheim. In the summer boats provide transport between these locations.

== Name ==
The name (Old Norse: Gendir) is derived from the Old Norse word gandr which means 'staff' or 'stick'. This is referring to the form of the long and narrow lake.

The official name is Gjende which is taken from the Gudbrandsdal traditional district dialect used in Lom Municipality and Vågå Municipality. In the nearby Vang Municipality, the name of the lake is Gjendin in their dialect. Gjendin is the form you find in Henrik Ibsen's name for what is now called Besseggen, formerly Gjendineggen, or Gendineggen in the older orthography. The name Gjende is derived from the Old Norse word "gandr" that can be translated into "straight stick", whereas the lake to the south Bygdin can be translated as "bent stick", the two names thereby referring to the shape of the lakes.

The lake gave its name to a famous early outdoors man and free thinker, Jo Gjende (1794–1884), who had a cabin at Gjende.

== Cultural and literary references ==
Lake Gjende is found in literature and travel books from the 18th century. Together, the Jotunheimen lakes of Gjende and Bygdin play in many such descriptions. For example, Henrik Ibsen's Peer Gynt took his famous wild-reindeer ride along "the Gjendin Ridge", a reference to either the narrow Besseggen Ridge - or the Knutshø ridge on the other side of lake Gjende.

== Media gallery ==
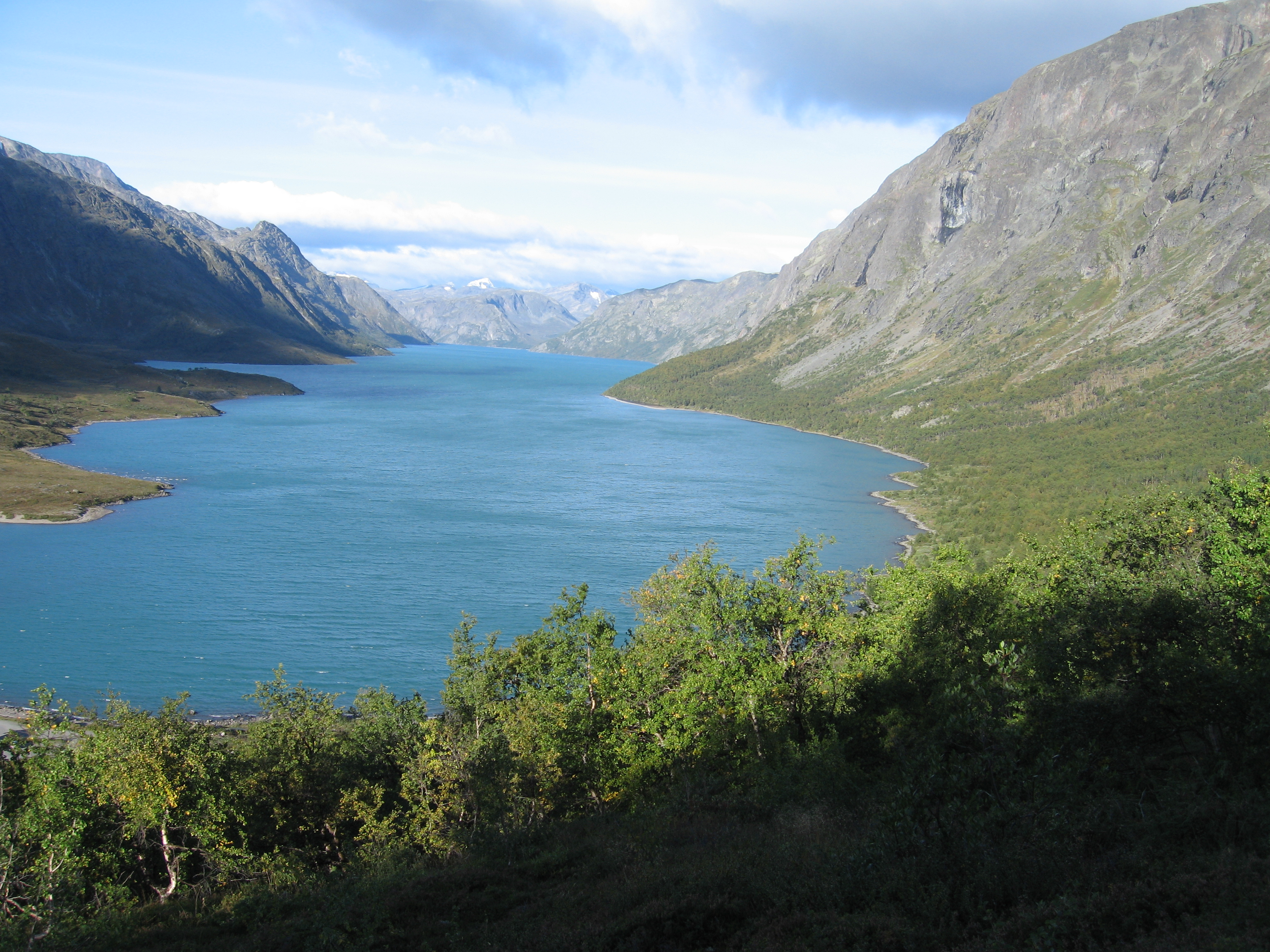
Lake Gjende as seen from Gjendesheim.

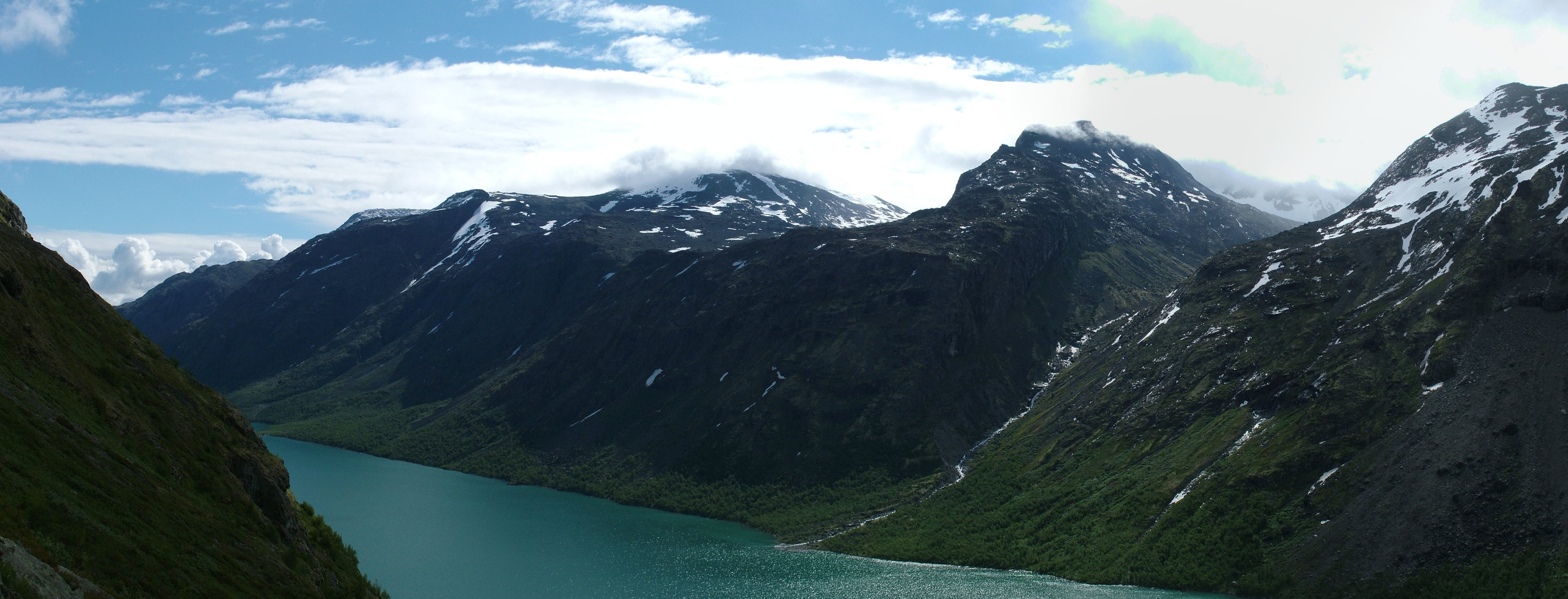
Panoramic view on the Gjende lake near Gjendesheim

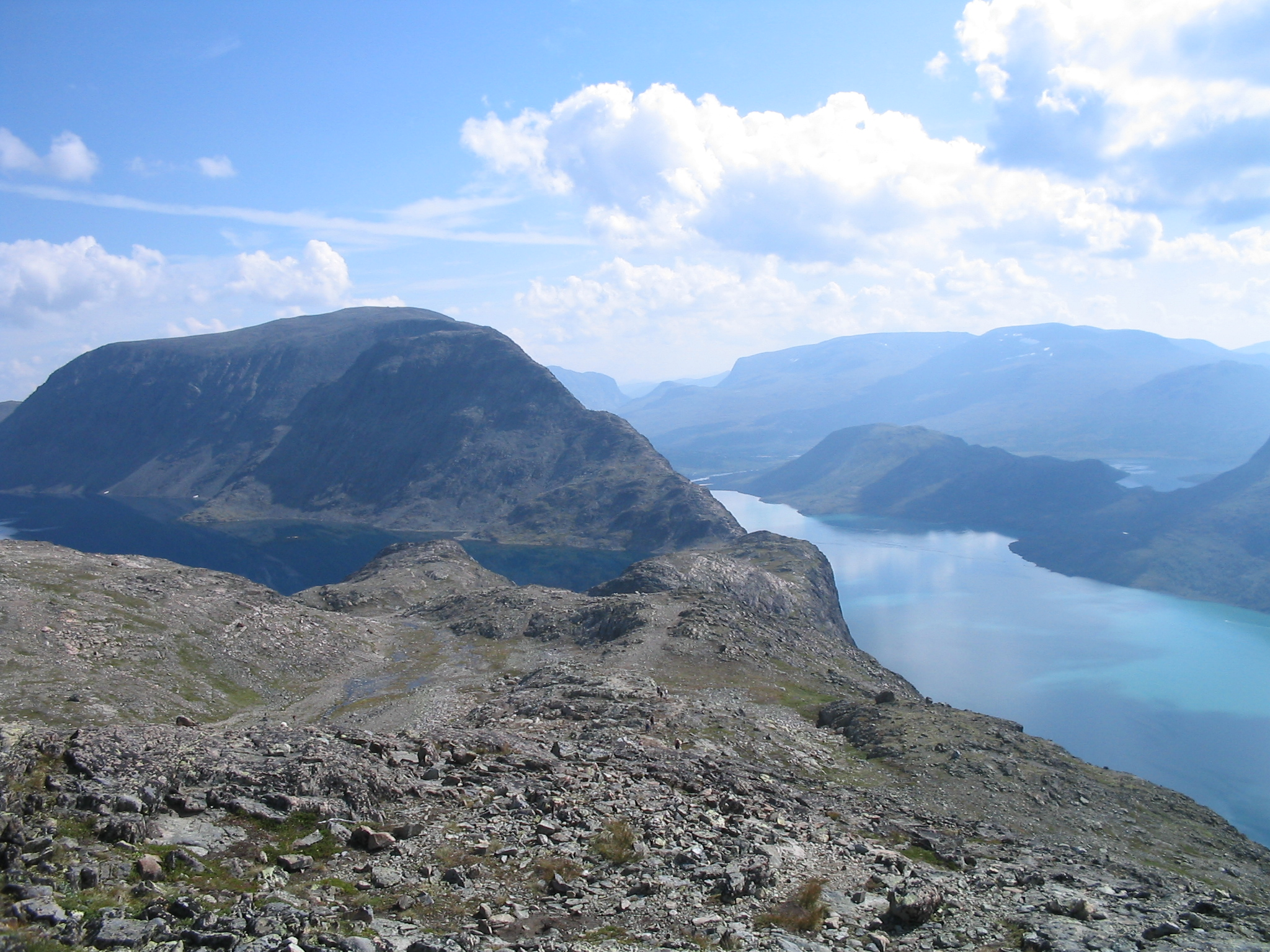
Besseggen seen from the east, with Gjende lake to the right and Bessvatnet to the left

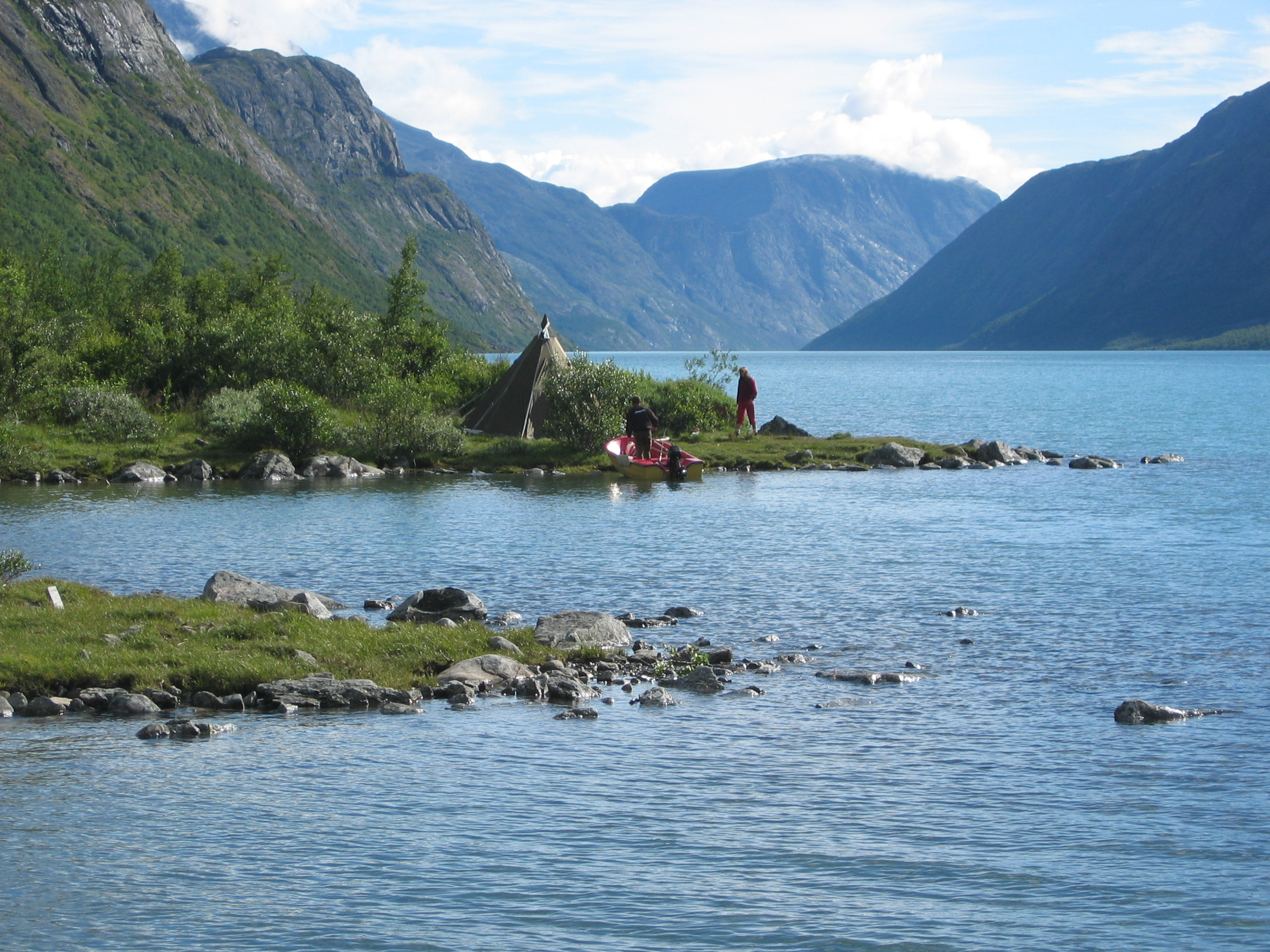
Camping at Gjende lake.

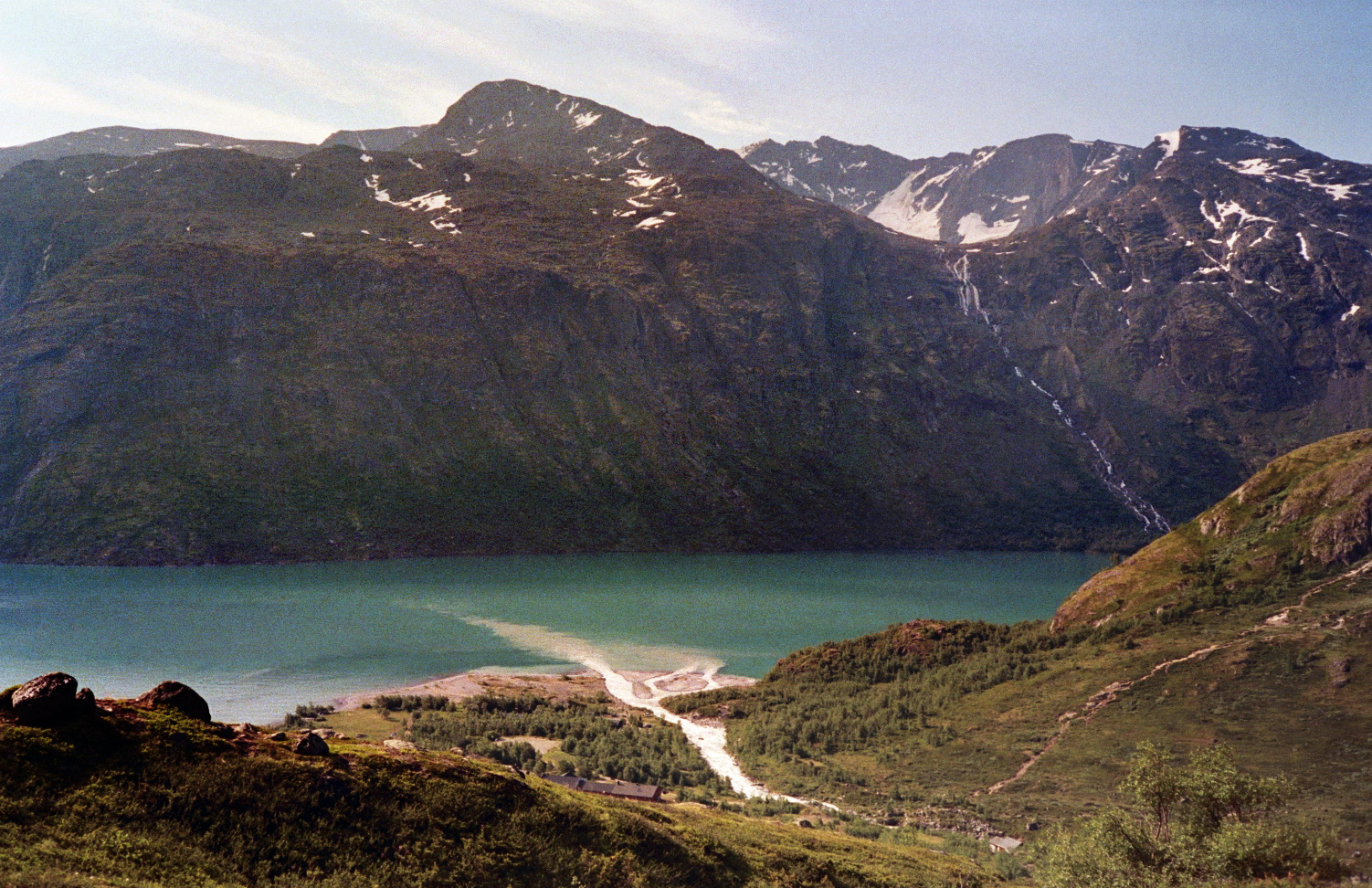
The river Muru flowing into Gjende lake next to Memurubu

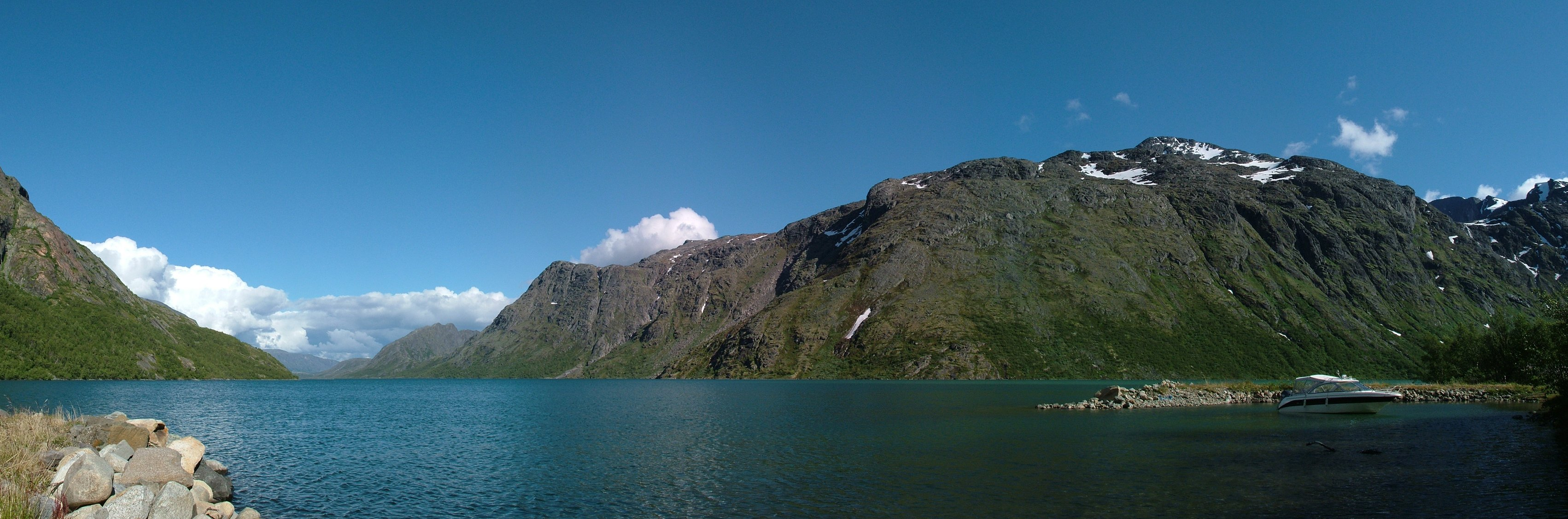
Panoramic view over Gjende lake near Memurubu

== See also ==
- List of lakes in Norway
