= Heidal Municipality =

Former municipality in Oppland, Norway

Heidal Municipality Heidal herad
- Former municipality
- Hedalen herred (historic name)
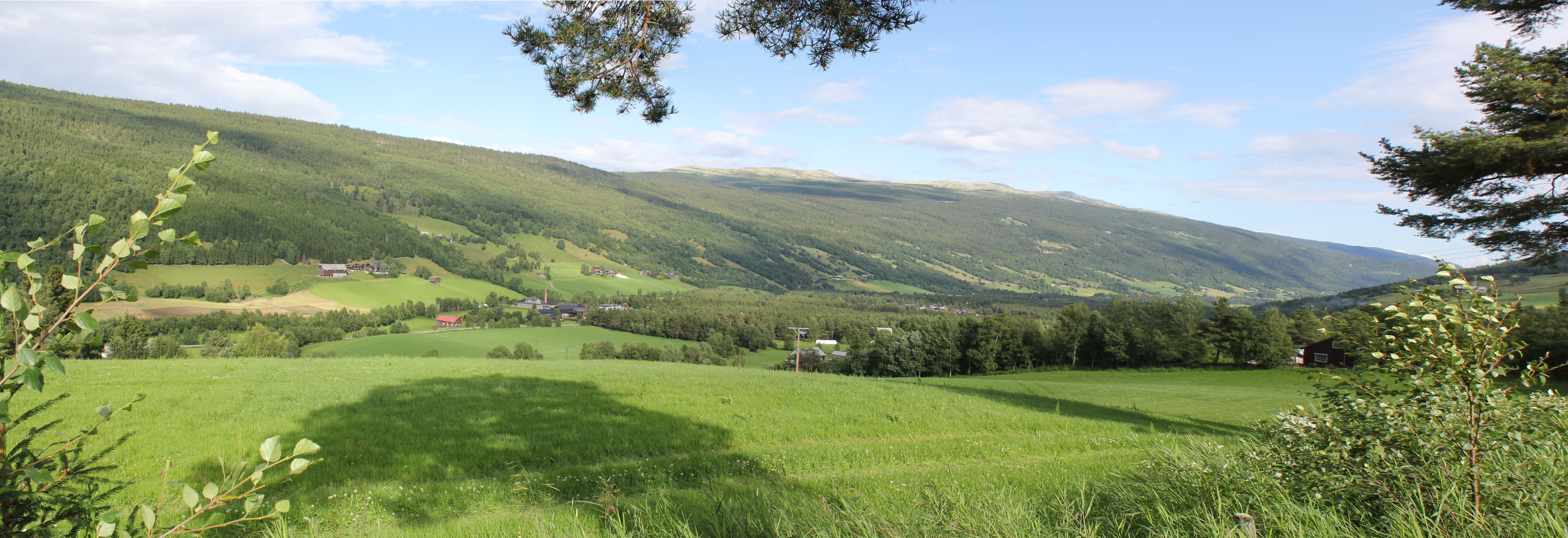
- View of the Heidal valley

- Oppland within Norway

- Heidal within Oppland
- Coordinates: 61°45′12″N 9°18′05″E
- Country: Norway
- County: Oppland
- District: Gudbrandsdalen
- Established: 1 Jan 1908
  - Preceded by: Vaage Municipality
- Disestablished: 1 Jan 1965
  - Succeeded by: Sel Municipality
- Administrative centre: Bjølstad

Government
  - Mayor (1959–1964): Olav Steinfinsbø (Ap)

Area (upon dissolution)
  - Total: 349.8 km^{2} (135.1 sq mi)
  - Rank: #253 in Norway
- Highest elevation: 1,745 m (5,725 ft)

Population (1964)
  - Total: 1,730
  - Rank: #426 in Norway
  - Density: 4.9/km^{2} (13/sq mi)
  - Change (10 years): ▼ −3.2%
- Demonym: Heidøl

Official language
  - Norwegian form: Nynorsk
- Time zone: UTC+01:00 (CET)
  - Summer (DST): UTC+02:00 (CEST)
- ISO 3166 code: NO-0516

Heidal is a former municipality in the old Oppland county, Norway. The 350-square-kilometre (140 sq mi) municipality existed from 1908 until its dissolution in 1965. The area is now part of Sel Municipality (Innlandet county) in the traditional district of Gudbrandsdal. The administrative centre was the village of Bjølstad where the Heidal Church is located. The municipality encompassed the whole Heidal valley area.

Prior to its dissolution in 1965, the 349.8-square-kilometre (135.1 sq mi) municipality was the 253rd largest by area out of the 525 municipalities in Norway. Heidal Municipality was the 426th most populous municipality in Norway with a population of about 1,730. The municipality's population density was 4.9 inhabitants per square kilometre (13/sq mi) and its population had decreased by 3.2% over the previous 10-year period.

== General information ==
The municipality of Heidal (originally spelled Hedalen) was established on 1 January 1908. On that date, the large Vaage Municipality was divided into three parts:

- the northeast part became Sel Municipality (population: 2,287)
- the southeast part became Heidal Municipality (population: 1,241)
- the western part remained as Vaage Municipality (population: 2,953).

During the 1960s, there were many municipal mergers across Norway due to the work of the Schei Committee. On 1 January 1965, the following areas were merged to form a new, larger Sel Municipality:

- Heidal Municipality (population: 1,731)
- Sel Municipality (population: 3,687)
- the Tolstadåsen area of Vågå Municipality (population: 35)
- the Sjoa area of Nord-Fron Municipality (population: 413)

=== Name ===
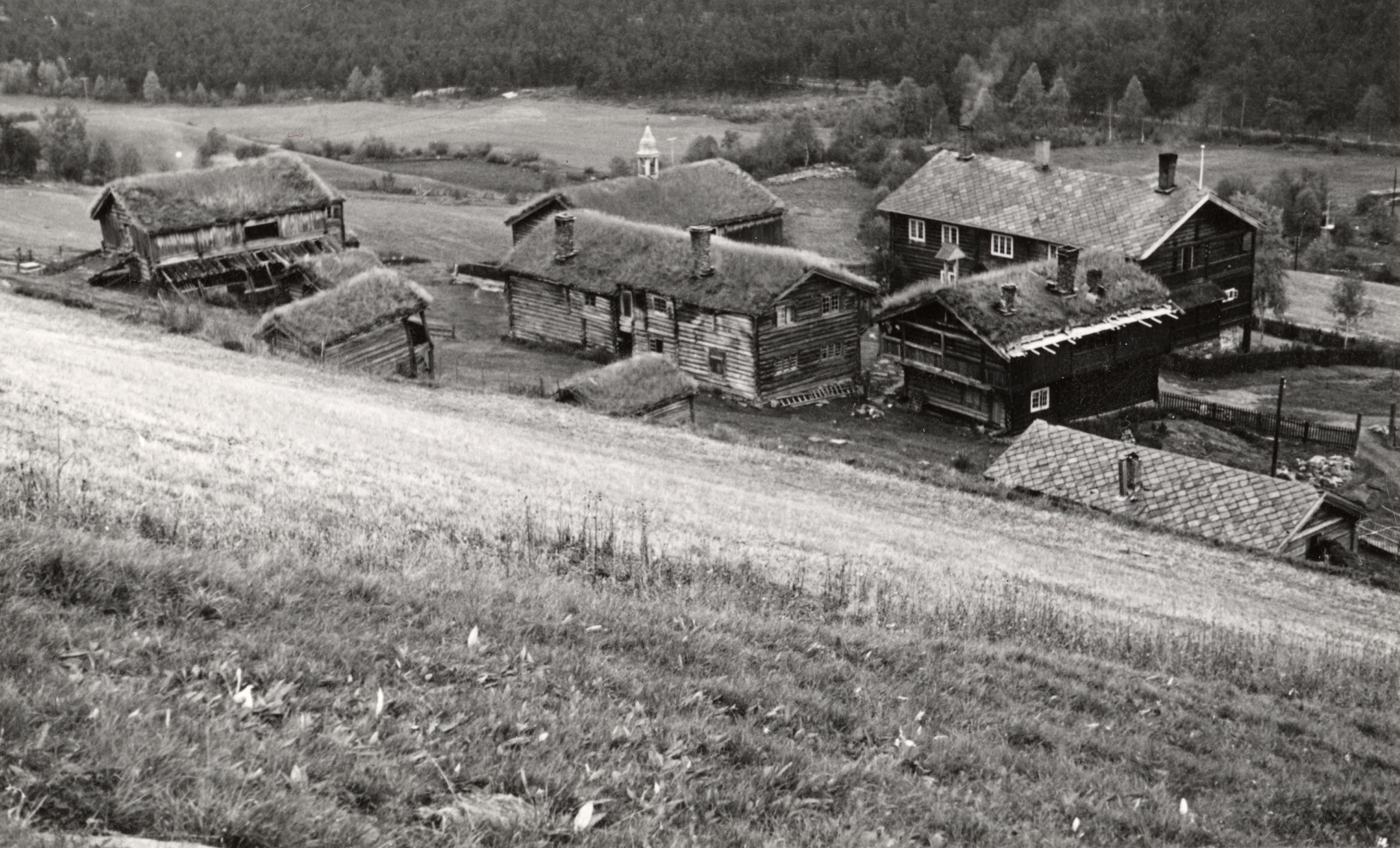
View of Bjølstad in Heidal (c. 1935)

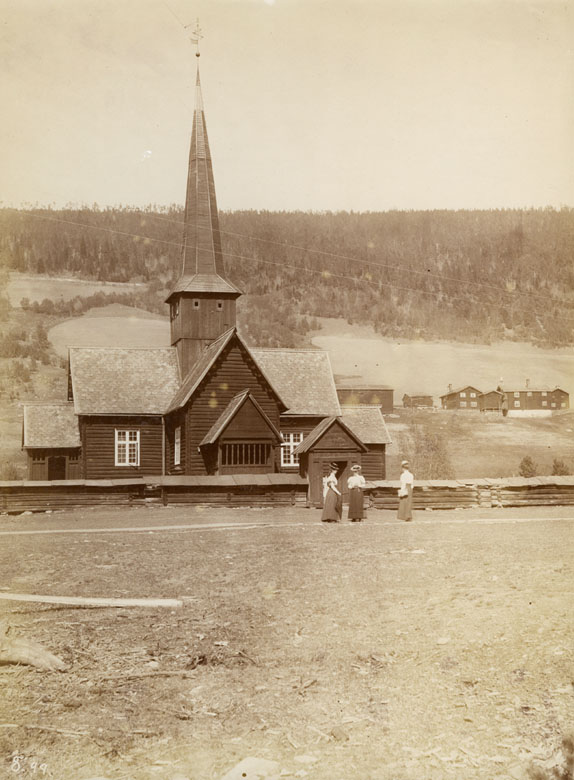
View of the Heidal Church

The municipality is named after the Heidal valley (Old Norse: Hæydalr) since the first Heidal Church was built there. The meaning of the first element is uncertain. It is possible that it comes from the old name for the local river Sjoa. The old river name was likely Hjó which is identical to the word hjó which is the first and third person indicative case of the word hǫggva which means "to hew" or "to chop". The last element is dalr which means "valley" or "dale". Historically, the name of the municipality was spelled Hedalen. On 3 November 1917, a royal resolution changed the spelling of the name of the municipality to Heidal, adding an "i" and removing the definite form ending -en.

=== Churches ===
The Church of Norway had one parish (sokn) within Heidal Municipality. At the time of the municipal dissolution, it was part of the Sel prestegjeld and the Nord-Gudbrandsdal prosti (deanery) in the Diocese of Hamar.

Churches in Heidal Municipality
Parish (sokn)	Church name	Location of the church	Year built
Heidal	Heidal Church	Bjølstad	1941

== Geography ==
The municipality is in the Heidal valley. Nord-Fron Municipality is to the south and east, Vågå Municipality was to the west and north, and Sel Municipality was to the northeast. The highest point in the municipality was the 1,745-metre (5,725 ft) tall mountain Mukampen.

== Government ==
While it existed, Heidal Municipality was responsible for primary education (through 10th grade), outpatient health services, senior citizen services, welfare and other social services, zoning, economic development, and municipal roads and utilities. The municipality was governed by a municipal council of directly elected representatives. The mayor was indirectly elected by a vote of the municipal council. The municipality was under the jurisdiction of the Eidsivating Court of Appeal.

=== Municipal council ===
The municipal council (Heradsstyre) of Heidal was made up of 13 representatives that were elected to four-year terms. The tables below show the historical composition of the council by political party.

Heidal heradsstyre 1963–1964
Party name (in Nynorsk)	Number of representatives
Labour Party (Arbeidarpartiet)	10
Centre Party (Senterpartiet)	3
Total number of members:	13
Note: On 1 January 1965, Heidal Municipality became part of Sel Municipality.

Heidal heradsstyre 1959–1963
Party name (in Nynorsk)	Number of representatives
Labour Party (Arbeidarpartiet)	7
Centre Party (Senterpartiet)	3
List of workers, fishermen, and small farmholders (Arbeidarar, fiskarar, småbrukarar liste)	3
Total number of members:	13

Heidal heradsstyre 1955–1959
Party name (in Nynorsk)	Number of representatives
Labour Party (Arbeidarpartiet)	8
Farmers' Party (Bondepartiet)	3
Local List(s) (Lokale lister)	2
Total number of members:	13

Heidal heradsstyre 1951–1955
Party name (in Nynorsk)	Number of representatives
Labour Party (Arbeidarpartiet)	6
Farmers' Party (Bondepartiet)	2
List of workers, fishermen, and small farmholders (Arbeidarar, fiskarar, småbrukarar liste)	4
Total number of members:	12

Heidal heradsstyre 1947–1951
Party name (in Nynorsk)	Number of representatives
Labour Party (Arbeidarpartiet)	6
Communist Party (Kommunistiske Parti)	1
Farmers' Party (Bondepartiet)	3
List of workers, fishermen, and small farmholders (Arbeidarar, fiskarar, småbrukarar liste)	2
Total number of members:	12

Heidal heradsstyre 1945–1947
Party name (in Nynorsk)	Number of representatives
Labour Party (Arbeidarpartiet)	7
List of workers, fishermen, and small farmholders (Arbeidarar, fiskarar, småbrukarar liste)	2
Local List(s) (Lokale lister)	3
Total number of members:	12

Heidal heradsstyre 1937–1941*
Party name (in Nynorsk)	Number of representatives
Labour Party (Arbeidarpartiet)	8
Farmers' Party (Bondepartiet)	1
Local List(s) (Lokale lister)	3
Total number of members:	12
Note: Due to the German occupation of Norway during World War II, no elections were held for new municipal councils until after the war ended in 1945.

=== Mayors ===
The mayor (Nynorsk: ordførar) of Heidal Municipality was the political leader of the municipality and the chairperson of the municipal council. The following people have held this position:

- 1908–1910: Jørgen Nielsen
- 1911–1925: Ivar Dahle (Ap)
- 1926–1928: Sverre Glad
- 1928–1937: Ivar Dahle (Ap)
- 1937–1940: Ola O. Hjellet (Ap)
- 1941–1945: Thor Tofte (NS)
- 1945–1959: Ola O. Hjellet (Ap)
- 1959–1964: Olav Steinfinsbø (Ap)

== See also ==
- List of former municipalities of Norway
