= Eistein Kjørn =

Norwegian Woodcarver

Eistein Guttormsen Kjørn, a.k.a. Østen Kjørn or Estin Kjørn, (1727–1805) was a Norwegian woodcarver.

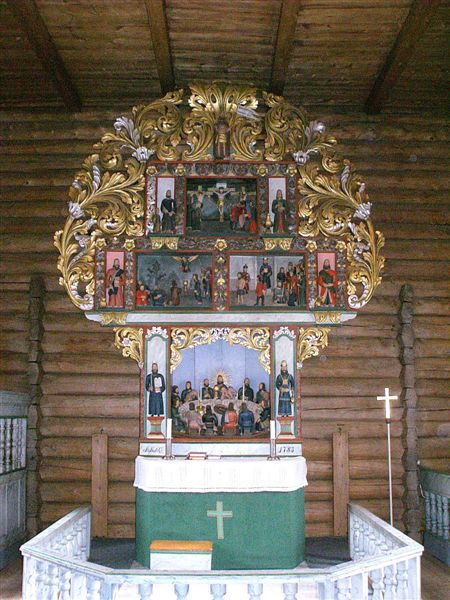
Kjørn's altarpiece in Sel Church

Kjørn was born at the old Sandbu farm in Vågå. He was one of the leading woodcarvers in the Gudbrandsdalen valley. He followed in the footsteps of Jakob Klukstad, whom Kjørn observed while working on the decoration for Heidal Church. In addition to woodcarving, Kjørn also wrote poems and psalms in the Vågå dialect, painted religious pictures, and carved soapstone gravestones. Kjørn died in Heidal.

== Works ==
- Modernization of the altarpiece in Vågå Church (1758)
- Kvikne Church: altarpiece and pulpit (1760)
- Svatsum Church: altarpiece (c. 1770), moved to Aulstad Church
- Follebu Church: pulpit (c. 1770), wooden carving reused for the new pulpit
- Kvam Church: renovated altarpiece (1776), church burned in 1940
- Hegge Stave Church: altarpiece (1780), transported over the mountains by sled
- Sel Church: altarpiece and chancel screen
