= Kvikne Church =

Church in Innlandet, Norway

- Kvikne kyrkje
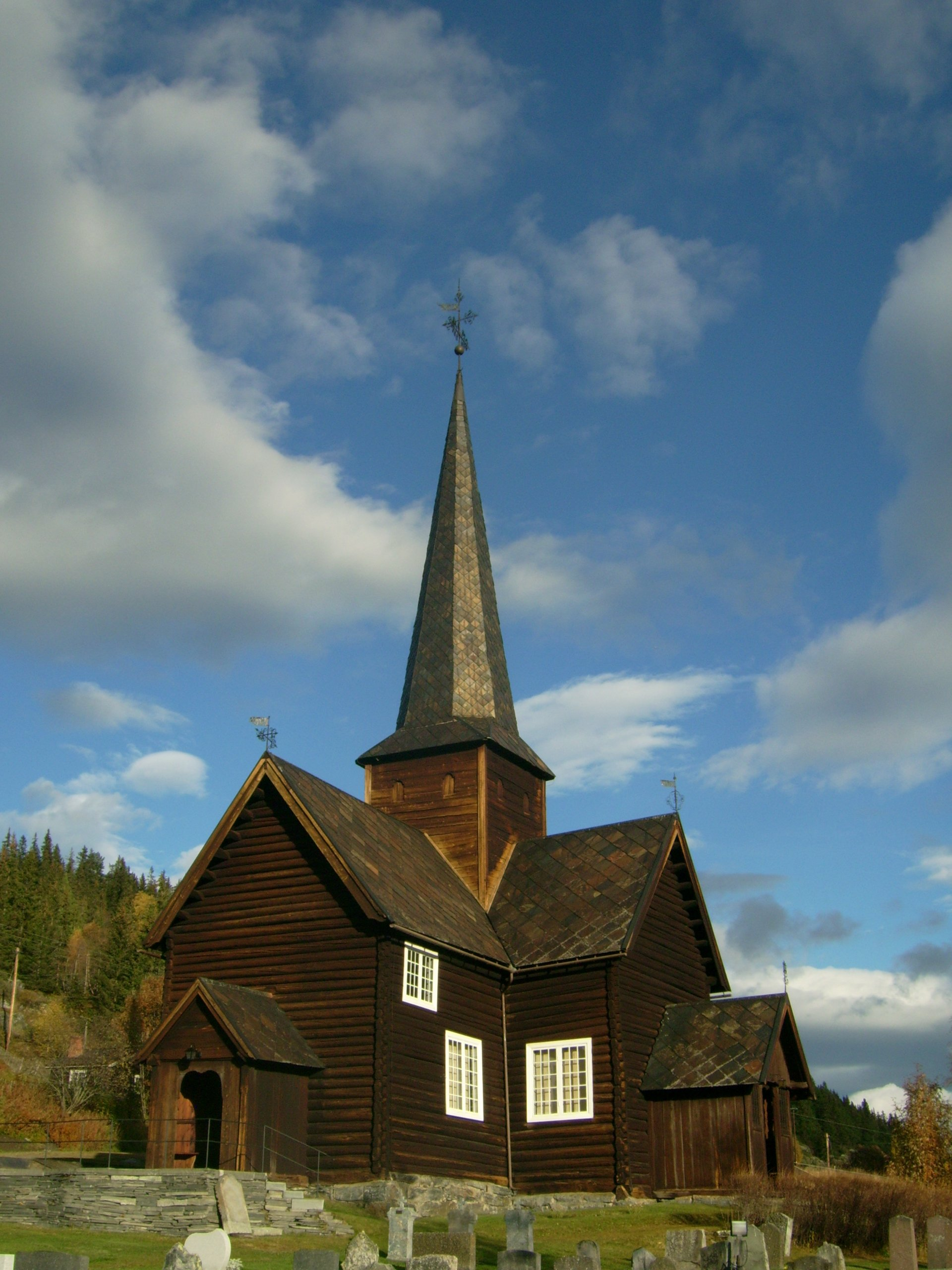
- View of the church
- Kvikne Church
- 61°34′28″N 9°35′16″E
- Location: Nord-Fron, Innlandet
- Country: Norway
- Denomination: Church of Norway
- Previous denomination: Catholic Church
- Churchmanship: Evangelical Lutheran

History
- Status: Parish church
- Founded: 14th century
- Consecrated: 1764
- Events: 1789

Architecture
- Functional status: Active
- Architect: Per Korpberget
- Architectural type: Cruciform
- Completed: 1764 (262 years ago)

Specifications
- Capacity: 160
- Materials: Wood

Administration
- Diocese: Hamar bispedømme
- Deanery: Nord-Gudbrandsdal prosti
- Parish: Kvikne
- Norwegian Cultural Heritage Site
- Type: Church
- Status: Automatically protected
- ID: 84865

Kvikne Church (Norwegian: Kvikne kyrkje) is a parish church of the Church of Norway in Nord-Fron Municipality in Innlandet county, Norway. It is located in the village of Kvikne. It is the church for the Kvikne parish which is part of the Nord-Gudbrandsdal prosti (deanery) in the Diocese of Hamar. The brown, wooden church was built in a cruciform design in 1764 using plans drawn up by the architect Per Korpberget. The church seats about 160 people.

The church cemetery has many old soapstone grave markers, several of which have been gathered under an awning. The church can be reached via Norwegian County Road 255.

== History ==
The first church in Kvikne was a wooden stave church that was likely built during the 14th century. This church was located at Sylte, about 1.5 kilometres (0.93 mi) to the southeast of the present church site. It was located on a steep hillside overlooking a river. The old stave church was torn down in the late 1580s. A new timber-framed church was built on the same site to replace it.

In 1764, the old church was torn down and a new church was built on the site. The new timber-framed cruciform church was built under the leadership of Per Korpberget. It was consecrated in 1764. Eistein Kjørn created the altar and pulpit for the church. The pulpit was based on Jakob Klukstad's pulpit for Heidal Church (which burned in 1933). The altar was also inspired by the altar at Heidal Church, but Kjørn exercised somewhat greater freedom in his creation. The baptismal font is carved from soapstone and was transferred from the older Kvikne Church.

In 1789, the Storofsen flood affected the area and this triggered some landslides. The church was partially hit by a landslide that caused some damage to the choir. After the flood, the decision was made to disassemble the church and to move it about 1.5 kilometres (0.93 mi) to the northwest to the Tune farm where the ground was less steep. The fairly new church was rebuilt using the same design as before. It has a tower over the central part of the nave, and there is a choir in the eastern cross arm and a sacristy in a small extension on the east end of the choir. The main entrance is on the west end, but there is also an entrance in the south end as well. The person responsible for the move was Jens Pedersen Korpberget (1753-1822), the son of Per Korpberget who built the church in 1764. The newly moved and rebuilt church was completed in 1790.

== See also ==
- List of churches in Hamar
