= Saukampen =

Saukampen may refer to:

- Saukampen (Lom), a mountain in Lom municipality in Innlandet county, Norway
- Saukampen (Nord-Fron), a mountain in Nord-Fron municipality in Innlandet county, Norway
