= Bjølstad Farm =

Farm in Sel, Innlandet County

Coordinates: 61°45′39″N 9°17′13″E

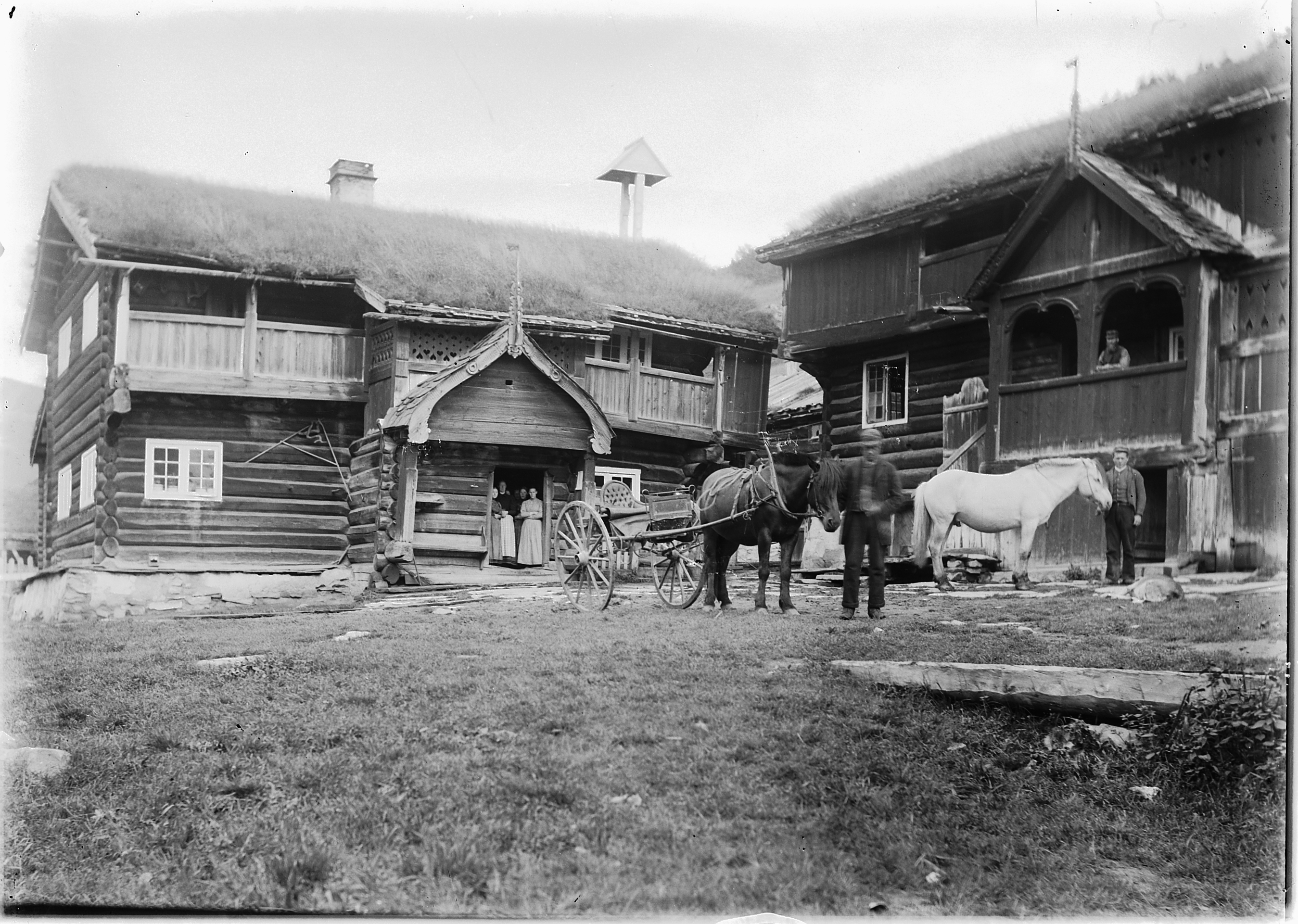
The Bjølstad Farm in Heidal in the Gudbrand Valley, 1910

The Bjølstad Farm (Norwegian: Bjølstad gård) is a farm in the Heidal valley of Sel Municipality in Innlandet county, Norway.

The farm was mentioned in written sources as early as 1270. Eirik Bjørnsson, who gradually purchased the farm in the 1430s, was the ancestor of the Bratt family, who had lived at the farm for many generations. By 1680, it had developed into a scattered farming settlement with more than 26 leased-out properties and 700 buildings. One of its larger properties is the farm named Søre Lykkja ('South Lykkja'), also known as Bjølstadløkken, to the northwest. The Veslesetra property also belongs to the farm. In 1904 the farm had 100 hectares (250 acres) of cultivated land and 3,000 hectares (7,400 acres) of forest. The farm is privately owned.

The Bjølstad Chapel, now relocated at Heidal Church, is a timber-framed structure dating from 1531 that can accommodate 75 people. Its doorposts are believed to date from an earlier stave church and are decorated with Urnes Style carvings. For a time, the chapel was defunct and used as a stable and barn.

Nine buildings at the Bjølstad Farm received protected status under the Cultural Heritage Act of 1920.

The farm served as the site where the 1959 Austrian film Und ewig singen die Wälder (The Forests Sing Forever) was filmed. It was based on Trygve Gulbranssen's 1933 book Og bakom synger skogene (Beyond Sing the Woods). In 1970, to mark the 850th anniversary of the Bratt family, over 2,000 members of the Bratt family met at a reunion at the farm and set up a memorial stone there.

A separate illustrated chapter is dedicated to Bjølstad in the 1882 travelogue Three in Norway (by Two of Them):

Sunday, September 19.— Bjölstad is an ancient Norwegian homestead, and consists of several separate buildings surrounding a central rectangular court. The house that we slept in bears the date of 1818, and is the most modern as well as the largest of the group; it is really a suite of state apartments for the use of the king on the rare occasions when he visits this part of his dominions. On the left-hand side of the courtyard as we stand at the door of our state apartments, is a very quaint and picturesque old house with a handsome porch, built in the Byzantine style, date 1743, and in this the owner lives whenever he comes to this farm. Opposite to us is another building even more curious in its architecture, and considerably older than the other; and the remaining side of the yard is occupied by another more modern edifice, used chiefly as a storehouse. Besides these there are several other detached outbuildings, in which sleighs, ploughs, spare cooking utensils, rugs, and various other useful and useless articles are kept, including all the fittings and even the weathercock of an ancient church which used to stand close to the farm, but which is now demolished and partly reduced to firewood.

— James A. Lees & Walter J. Clutterbuck, Three in Norway (by Two of Them) (1882)
