= Svatsum Church =

Church in Innlandet, Norway

- Svatsum kirke
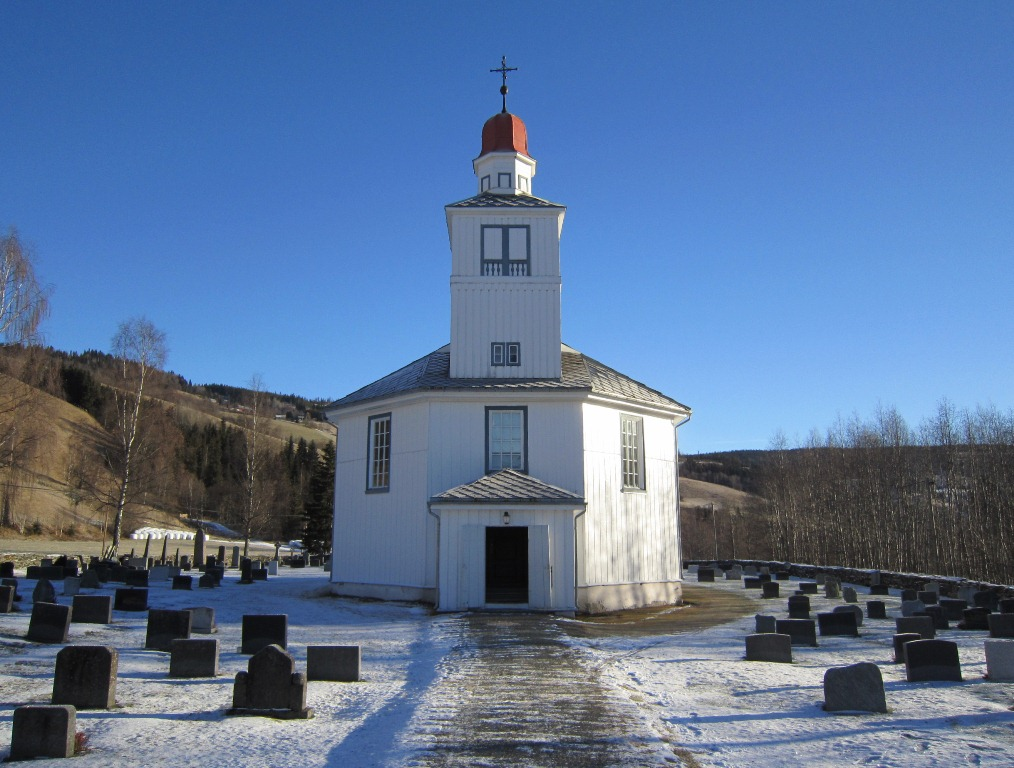
- View of the church
- Svatsum Church
- 61°19′09″N 9°51′20″E
- Location: Gausdal Municipality, Innlandet
- Country: Norway
- Denomination: Church of Norway
- Previous denomination: Catholic Church
- Churchmanship: Evangelical Lutheran

History
- Status: Parish church
- Founded: 1860
- Consecrated: 1860

Architecture
- Functional status: Active
- Architect: Otto Hjort Friis
- Architectural type: Octagonal
- Completed: 1860 (166 years ago)

Specifications
- Capacity: 250
- Materials: Wood

Administration
- Diocese: Hamar bispedømme
- Deanery: Sør-Gudbrandsdal prosti
- Parish: Svatsum
- Norwegian Cultural Heritage Site
- Type: Church
- Status: Protected
- ID: 85010

Svatsum Church (Norwegian: Svatsum kirke) is a parish church of the Church of Norway in Gausdal Municipality in Innlandet county, Norway. It is located in the village of Svatsum. It is the church for the Svatsum parish which is part of the Sør-Gudbrandsdal prosti (deanery) in the Diocese of Hamar. The white, wooden church was built in a octagonal design in 1860 using plans drawn up by the architect Otto Hjort Friis. The church seats about 250 people.

The church can be reached via Norwegian County Road 255. There is a cemetery next to the church.

== History ==
The earliest existing historical records of the church date back to the year 1344, but it was not new that year. The church is also sometimes referred to by older spellings such as Saurtsæimi, Suartzheim or more recently Svartsheim. The first church at Svatsum was a wooden stave church that was likely built around the year 1300. This church was located at the Kirkebø farm, about 300 metres (980 ft) north of the present church site. A wooden carving of Mary with the infant Christ and a wooden carving of Paul are found in the Nordic Museum and can be attributed to having been in the stave church at Svatsum. The statue of Paul is one of the chief works of early church art from the Gudbrandsdalen valley. An altar crucifix at the Nordic Museum is also believed to come from Svatsum, and it ended up at the museum (after first being transferred to Aulstad Church). Archival documents refer to repairs and maintenance at the church in the 1600s and continuing until 1724.

An inspection in 1725 concluded that the church was very old and dilapidated and had to be replaced right away. This happened the following year, when a new church was built at the bottom of the valley, about 300 metres (980 ft) to the south. The new church was a timber-framed long church that included a small apartment with a wood stove so that the priest could spend the night at the church when needed. After the new church was completed, the old stave church was torn down in 1726. The church quickly fell into disrepair. By the mid-1800s, the parish began discussing a major repair of the church, but in the end, it was decided to tear down the church and build a new church on the same site. The materials from the old church was used to build the new Aulstad Church in another part of the municipality. An altar and woodcarving by Eistein Kjørn from the old Svatsum church were also moved to the new Aulstad Church.

The new church is a timber-framed octagonal building. The new church was designed by Otto Hjort Friis and built by carpenter Johann Eriksen from Lillehammer. The new church was consecrated on 25 October 1860. The unique tower makes an almost Byzantine impression. At the eastern end of the church is a small sacristy that was added in the 1920s.

The present church has three bells, two date from around the year 1300 and one from 1981; one of the older bells is no longer in use. The altarpiece was painted by Christen Brun. The pulpit dates from 1860, and the pipe organ from 1960. The baptismal bowl is older than the church building.

== See also ==
- List of churches in Hamar
