= Bjølstad =

Village in Sel Municipality, Norway

Bjølstadmo Heidal / Bjølstad
- Village
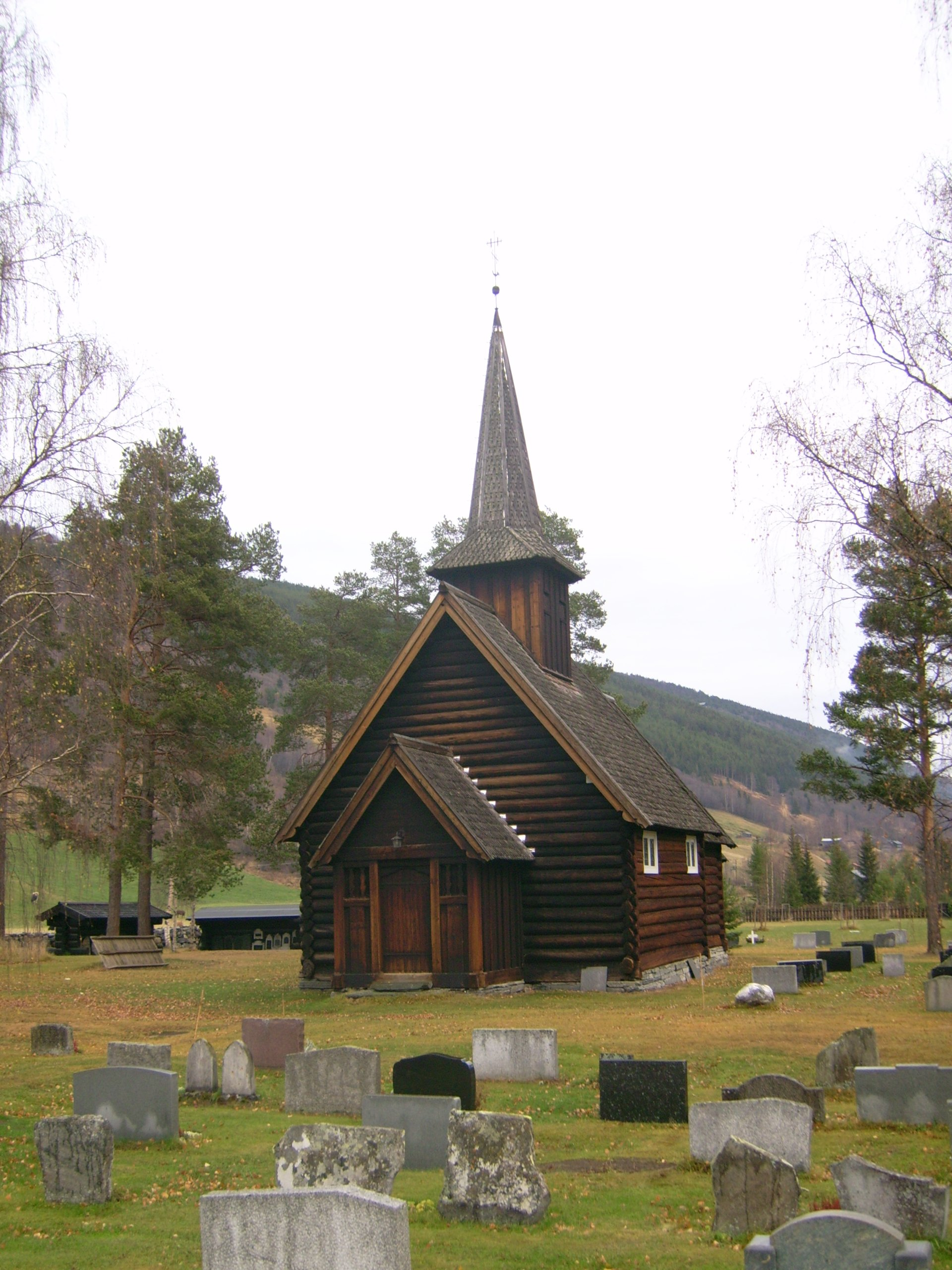
- View of the village
- Interactive map of Bjølstadmo
- Location within Innlandet Location within Norway
- Coordinates: 61.75858°N 9.28615°E
- Country: Norway
- Region: Eastern Norway
- County: Innlandet
- District: Gudbrandsdalen
- Municipality: Sel Municipality

Area
  - Total: 0.53 km^{2} (0.20 sq mi)
- Elevation: 473 m (1,552 ft)

Population (2024)
  - Total: 370
  - Density: 698/km^{2} (1,810/sq mi)
- Time zone: UTC+01:00 (CET)
  - Summer (DST): UTC+02:00 (CEST)
- Post Code: 2676 Heidal

Bjølstadmo (also called Heidal or Bjølstad) is a village in Sel Municipality in Innlandet county, Norway. The village is located in the Heidal valley, about 5 kilometres (3.1 mi) northeast of the village of Skogbygda and about 15 kilometres (9.3 mi) southwest of the town of Otta.

The 0.53-square-kilometre (130-acre) village has a population (2024) of 370 and a population density of 698 inhabitants per square kilometre (1,810/sq mi).

== History ==
The village is the site of the historic Bjølstad Farm and the Heidal Church. Historically, this small village was the administrative centre of the old Heidal Municipality which existed from 1908 until 1965.
