= Gjesling =

Gjesling (or Gjæsling) is an old family from the area that is now Vågå Municipality in Innlandet county, Norway.

== History ==
In 1130 Ivar Gjesling was the earliest-known owner of the Sandbu farm, located just south of Vågåmo. He served as King Magnus IV's lendmann (governor) for the Oplands. Ivar Gjesling, allied himself with the Birchlegs (Birkebeinerne) — who chose Sverre as their King at the Øreting in 1177. King Sverre granted him the valley of Heidal as a reward.

Sigrid Undset's fictional Lady Ragnfrid, wife of Lavrans, was created a Gjesling from Sandbu.

Gjesling descendants still own the farm Sandbu in the Vågå region, Riddersandbu, which includes buildings built before 1600.
