= Aulstad Church =

Church in Innlandet, Norway

- Aulstad kirke
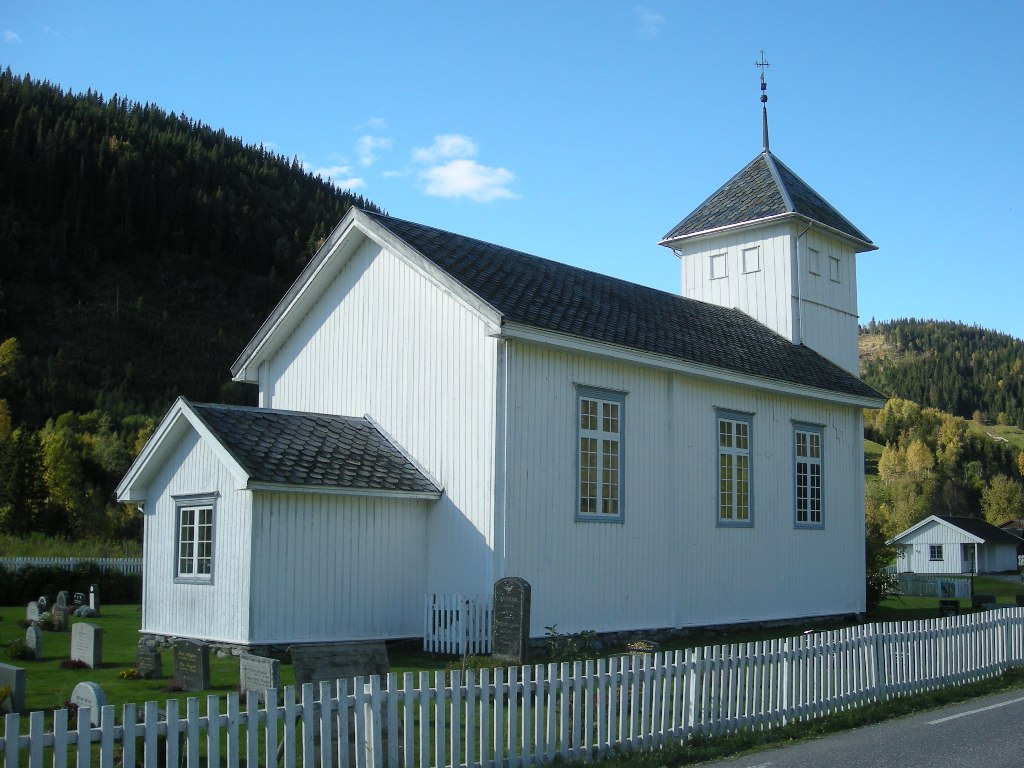
- View of the church
- Aulstad Church
- 61°16′26″N 10°00′17″E
- Location: Gausdal Municipality, Innlandet
- Country: Norway
- Denomination: Church of Norway
- Churchmanship: Evangelical Lutheran

History
- Status: Parish church
- Founded: 1864
- Consecrated: 1864

Architecture
- Functional status: Active
- Architectural type: Long church
- Completed: 1864 (162 years ago)

Specifications
- Capacity: 150
- Materials: Wood

Administration
- Diocese: Hamar bispedømme
- Deanery: Sør-Gudbrandsdal prosti
- Parish: Aulstad
- Norwegian Cultural Heritage Site
- Type: Church
- Status: Protected
- ID: 83810

Aulstad Church (Norwegian: Aulstad kirke) is a parish church of the Church of Norway in Gausdal Municipality in Innlandet county, Norway. It is located in the village of Aulstad. It is the church for the Aulstad parish which is part of the Sør-Gudbrandsdal prosti (deanery) in the Diocese of Hamar. The white, wooden church was built in a long church design in 1864 using plans drawn up by an unknown architect. The church seats about 150 people.

The church can be reached via Norwegian County Road 255. There is a cemetery next to the church.

== History ==
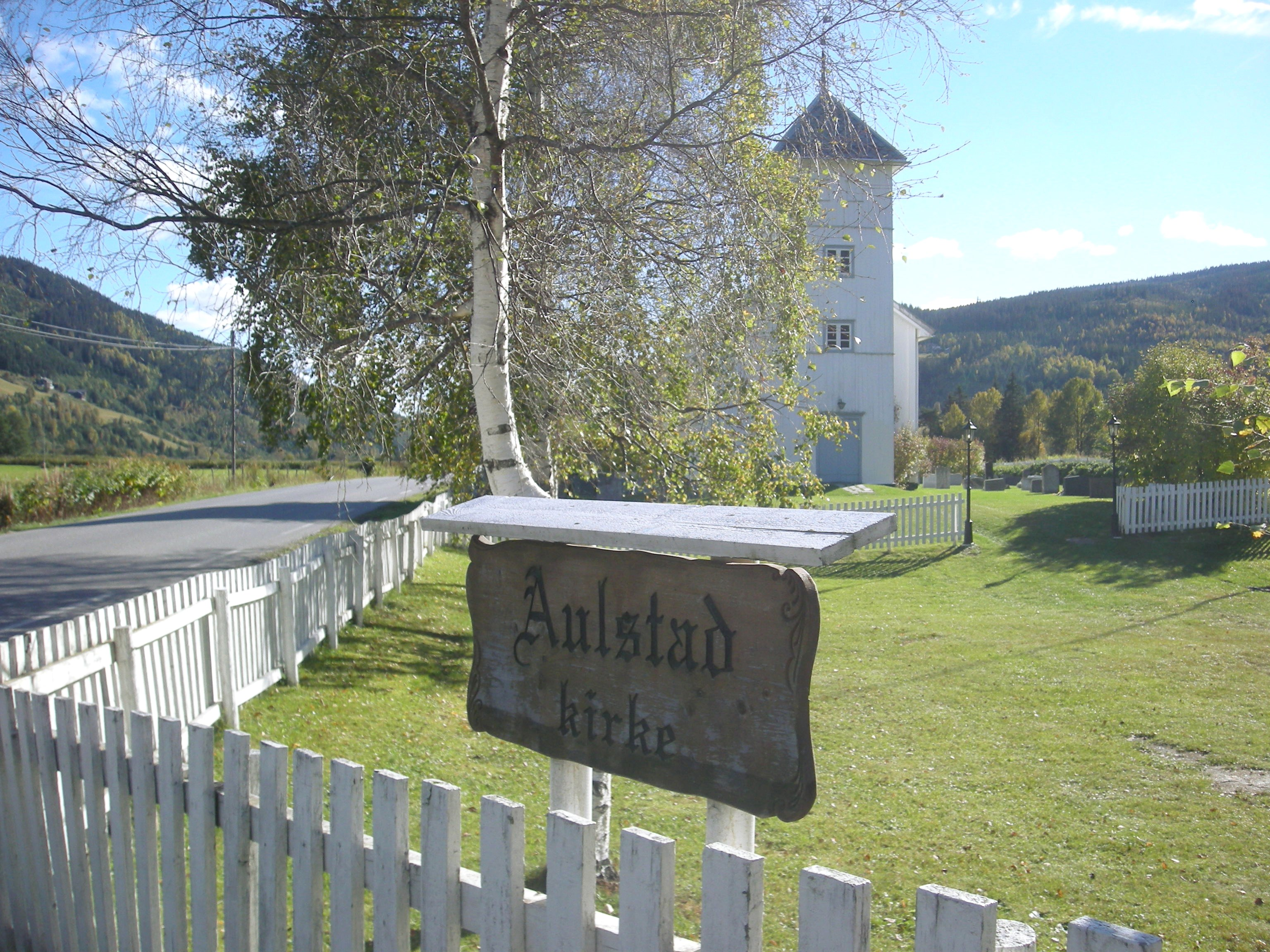
View of the church

In the 1860s, the parish received permission to build a new church in Aulstad. The old Svatsum Church had been torn down in 1860, and many of the materials were reused in the construction of the new Aulstad Church. Construction on the new church took place in 1864. The new church was a small long church with a choir and small sacristy on the east end of the nave. There was a small church porch with a tower on the west end of the nave. Some of the furnishings from the old Svatsum Church were also transferred to the new church including the altar and a wooden carving by Eistein Kjørn. The new church was consecrated in 1864.

== See also ==
- List of churches in Hamar
