= Tokampen =

Mountain in Innlandet, Norway

- Thokampen
- Interactive map of the mountain

Highest point
- Elevation: 866 m (2,841 ft)
- Prominence: 37 m (121 ft)
- Parent peak: Søre Svartkampen
- Isolation: 0.35 km (0.22 mi)
- Coordinates: 61°45′38″N 9°30′14″E

Geography
- Location: Innlandet, Norway

Tokampen is a mountain in Sel Municipality in Innlandet county, Norway. The 866-metre (2,841 ft) tall mountain is located between the Rondane and Jotunheimen mountains. The mountain sits about 2 kilometres (1.2 mi) southwest of the town of Otta. The mountain is just west of the mountain Pillarguri and about 15 kilometres (9.3 mi) northeast of the mountain Heidalsmuen.

== See also ==
- List of mountains of Norway by height
