= Heidal cheese =

Norwegian brunost

Heidal cheese (Norwegian: heidalsost or simply heidal) is a Norwegian brunost.

The cheese is named after the parish of Heidal in the northern part of the Gudbrand Valley. It is dark brown. Heidal cheese is a molded cheese that was first produced at one of the many farms in Heidal. The cheese is currently produced by the Tine company and by the local Heidal Cheese Factory in Heidal.

== See also ==
- List of cheeses
