= Pillarguri =

Mountain in Innlandet, Norway

- Pillarguritoppen
- Interactive map of the mountain

Highest point
- Elevation: 852 m (2,795 ft)
- Coordinates: 61°45′27″N 9°31′17″E

Geography
- Location: Innlandet, Norway

Pillarguri or Pillarguritoppen is a mountain in Sel Municipality in Innlandet county, Norway. The 852-metre (2,795 ft) tall mountain is located between the Rondane and Jotunheimen mountains. The mountain sits about 2 kilometres (1.2 mi) southwest of the town of Otta. The mountain is just east of the mountain Thokampen and about 15 kilometres (9.3 mi) northeast of the mountain Heidalsmuen.

== See also ==
- List of mountains of Norway by height
