= Heidal =

Valley in Innlandet, Norway

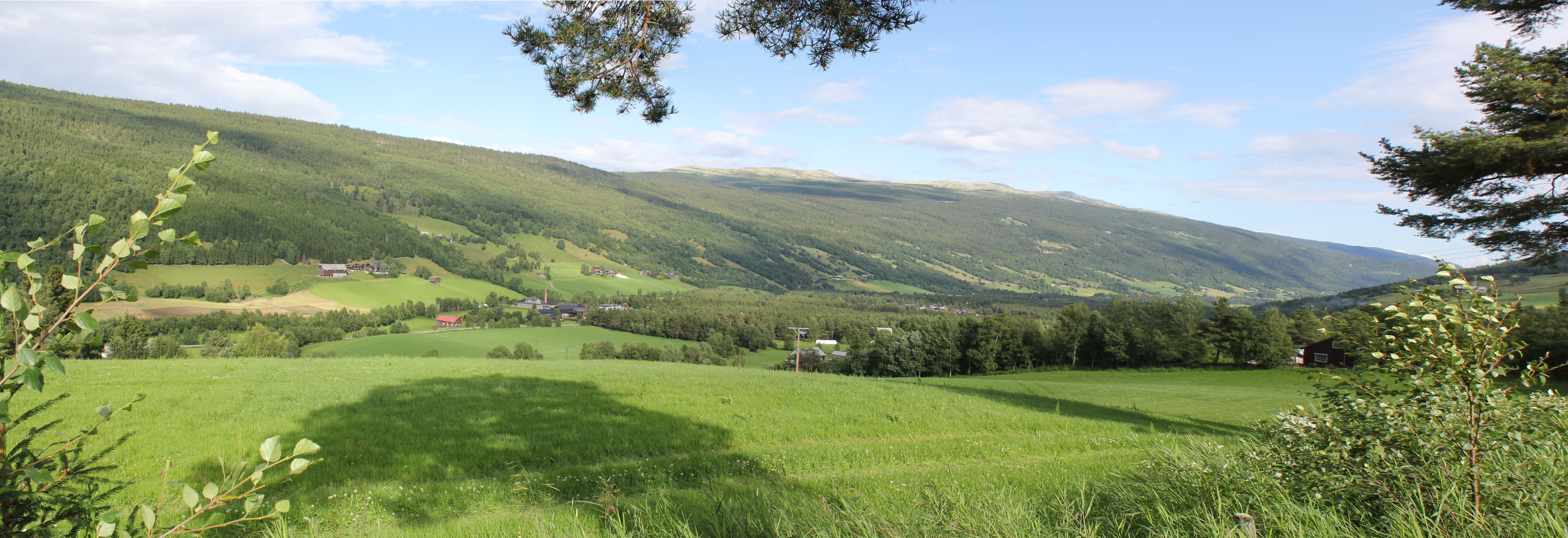
- View of the Heidal valley

Geology
- Type: River valley

Geography
- Location: Innlandet, Norway
- Population centers: Bjølstad
- Coordinates: 61.74591°N 9.32202°E
- River: Sjoa

Location
- Interactive map of the valley

Heidal is a valley in Sel Municipality in Innlandet county, Norway. The U-shaped valley follows the river Sjoa which begins in the nearby Jotunheimen mountains eastward until it joins the Gudbrandsdalslågen river in the main valley which runs through the region, Gudbrandsdalen. The western end of the Sjoa river valley is in Vågå Municipality and there, it is called the Sjodalen valley. The main urban area in the valley is the village of Bjølstad (also known as Heidal). From 1908-1965, the Heidal valley was an independent municipality called Heidal Municipality, and since 1965, it has been a part of Sel Municipality.

The valley runs northwest from the village of Sjoa for about 16 kilometres (9.9 mi) to the village of Bjølstad where the valley curves to the southwest/south for about 15 kilometres (9.3 mi) before entering Vågå Municipality. After entering Vågå, the valley becomes much narrower as it enters into the Jotunheimen mountains and heading to the source of the river, the large lake Gjende.

== History ==
In the year 1177, Ivar Gjæsling was King Magnus IV's lendmann for the Opplands. Gjesling allied himself with the Birkebeiners (who chose Sverre as their king at Øreting in Nidaros in 1177). In return, King Sverre granted Gjesling the whole Heidal valley.

Heidal is rich in beauty and tradition. It has a high concentration of older protected timber houses and farmsteads. The main industries are agriculture and forestry. Local traditions includes carpentry, wood carving, painting and weaving.

Heidal Church (Heidal Kyrkje) was built during the period 1937-41 as an exact replica of a 1754 church which was destroyed after being struck by lightning in 1933. Heidal Church is a cruciform church as are most of the churches in the Gudbrand Valley. The church was built of wood. It has about 300 seats and three galleries. The church was designed by architect Bredo Berntsen (1877–1957). The altarpiece is a work by the Norwegian sculptor Jakob Klukstad. Near the church stands the Bjølstad Chapel (Bjølstad-kapellet). Bjølstad Chapel seating 75 and dates from around 1531.

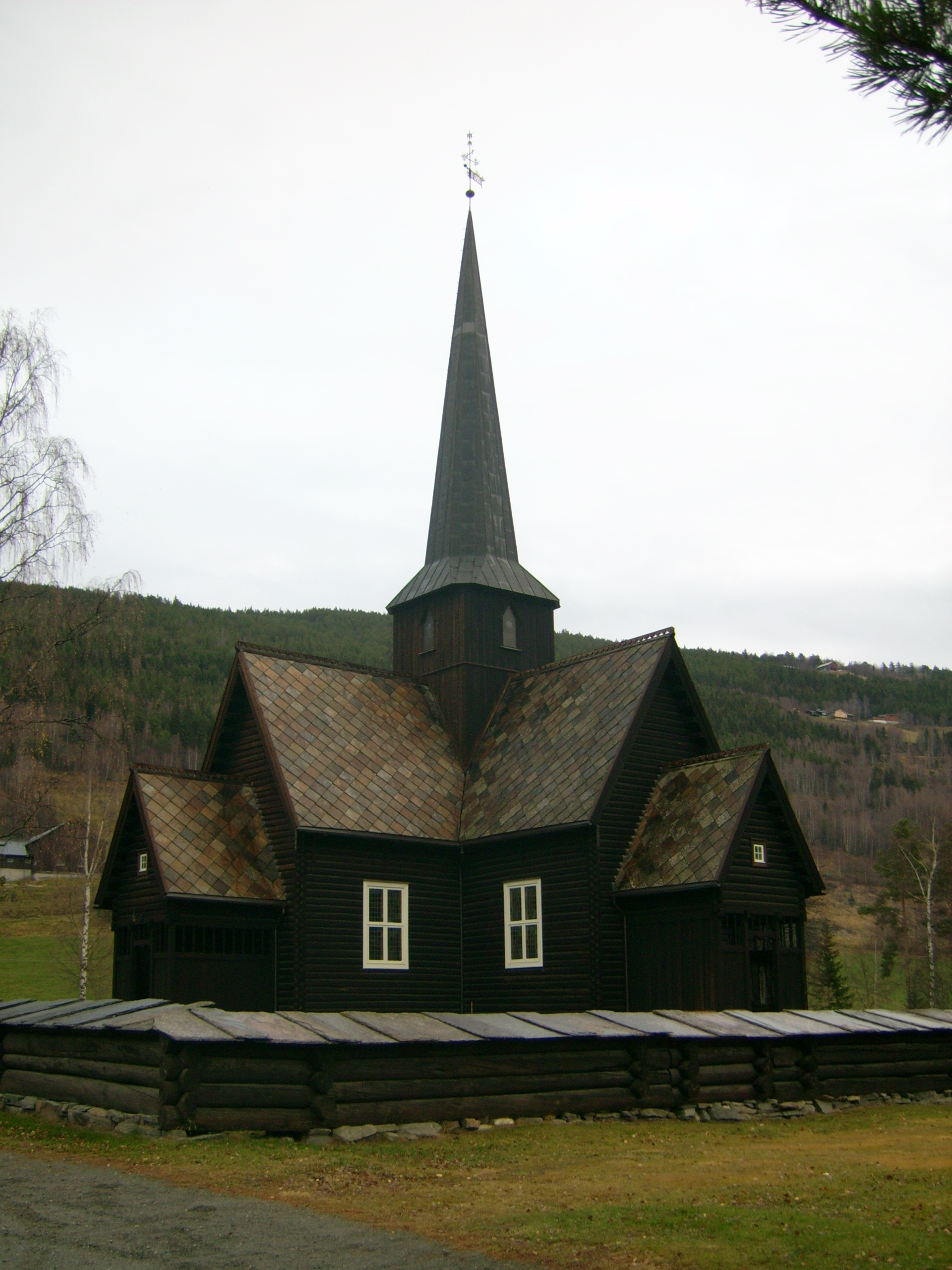
Heidal Church

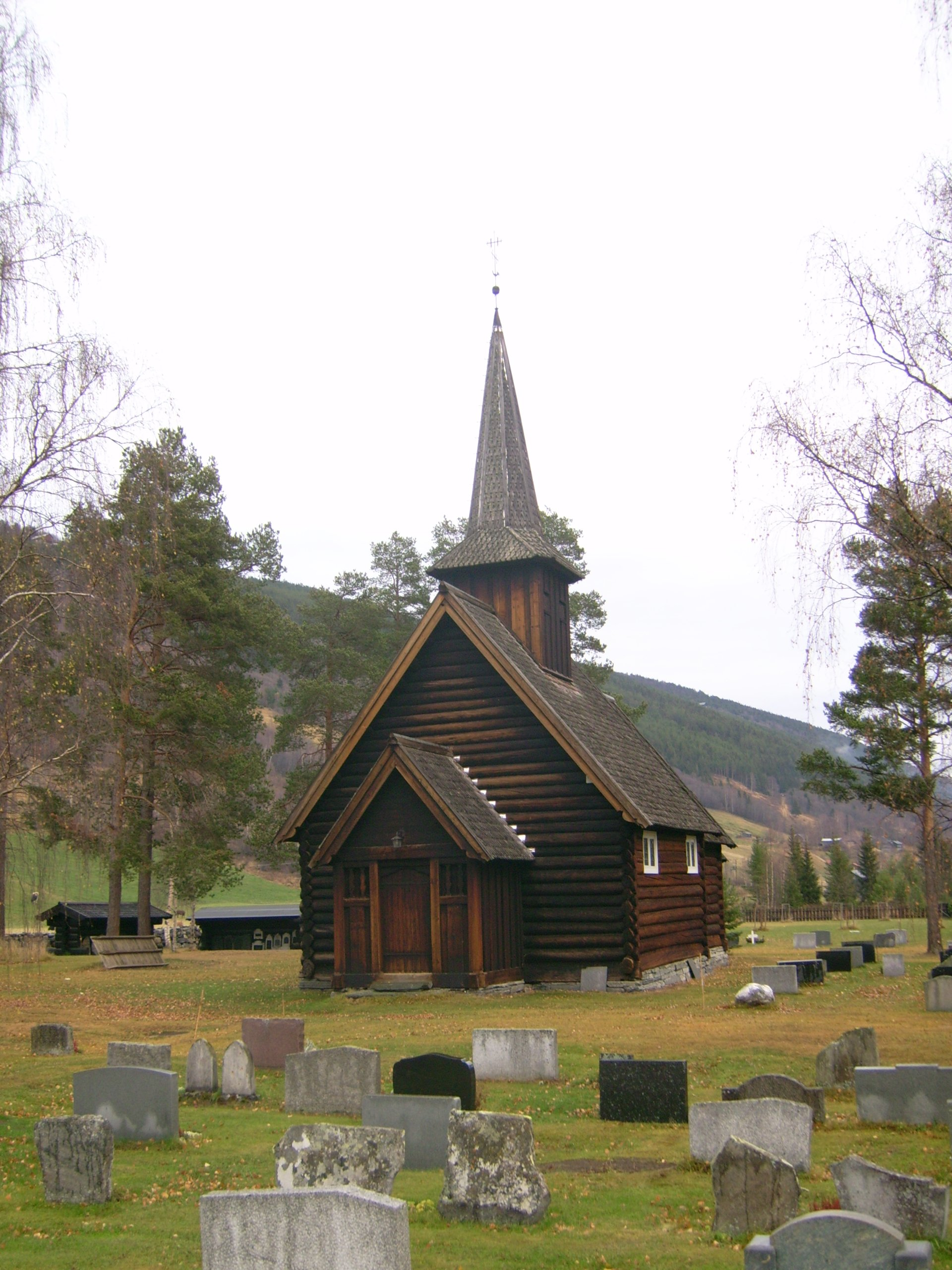
Bjølstad Chapel

Some locations in the valley allow guided tours, including the Søre Harildstad farm and Bjølstad Chapel. Farms like the Bjølstad Farm are not open to the public. At the Bjølstad Farm the newest building was constructed in about 1820 and the farm has been in the same family since the 13th century.

== See also ==
- Heidalsmuen
- Heidal cheese
