= Saukampen (Nord-Fron) =

Mountain in Innlandet, Norway

- Interactive map of the mountain

Highest point
- Elevation: 1,659 m (5,443 ft)
- Prominence: 519 m (1,703 ft)
- Parent peak: Heidalsmuen
- Isolation: 4.9 km (3.0 mi) to Heidalsmuen
- Coordinates: 61°37′39″N 9°26′19″E

Geography
- Location: Innlandet, Norway

Saukampen is a mountain in Nord-Fron Municipality in Innlandet county, Norway. The 1,659-metre (5,443 ft) tall mountain is located about 16 kilometres (9.9 mi) west of the town of Vinstra and about 7 kilometres (4.3 mi) southwest of the village of Sjoa. The mountain Heidalsmuen lies 5 kilometres (3.1 mi) to the west of Saukampen.

== See also ==
- List of mountains of Norway by height
