= Three in Norway (by two of them) =

1882 travelogue of Norway

Three in Norway (by two of them) is a travelogue from the 19th century in Norway, written by James A. Lees and Walter J. Clutterbuck. Fjågesund and Syme identify it as one of the most frequently reprinted travel accounts for Norway.

== Development of the narrative ==
First published in 1882, the book tells, in an engaging humorous and deadpan style, the adventures of three friends who set out to fish and shoot through one long summer, traveling by canoe and camping along the way through Espedalen to Jotunheimen, a mountainous area. This amusing party make light of the rigours of outdoor life in Norway and enjoy every minute of their idyllic tour, with pristine lakes full of large eager trout, which have never seen an artificial fly, heather hills rich with ptarmigan and reindeer, the characters among the Norwegian country folk they encounter. A typical sentence from the book: "It continued raining in a nice keep-at-it-all-day-if-you-like kind of manner, so we resided in the tent, and read, and indulged in whisky and water for lunch to counteract any ill effects of the reading – for some of it was poetry."

== Publication history ==
There were many editions published in the latter years of the nineteenth century. A 2003 limited edition published by The Flyfisher's Classic Library quickly sold out, and in 2008/9 there was a new Flyfisher's Classic Library edition, as well as a new paperback edition published by Coch-y-Bonddu Books. These editions carry a new introduction by Jon Beer, who retraced the steps of the Three in Norway over 100 years later.

It served as an inspiration for the travelogue Three Men in a Boat (To Say Nothing of the Dog), a humorous account by Jerome K. Jerome of a boating holiday on the River Thames between Kingston upon Thames and Oxford, which was published in 1889.
