= Heidalsmuen =

Mountain in Innlandet, Norway

Heidalsmuen Mukampen
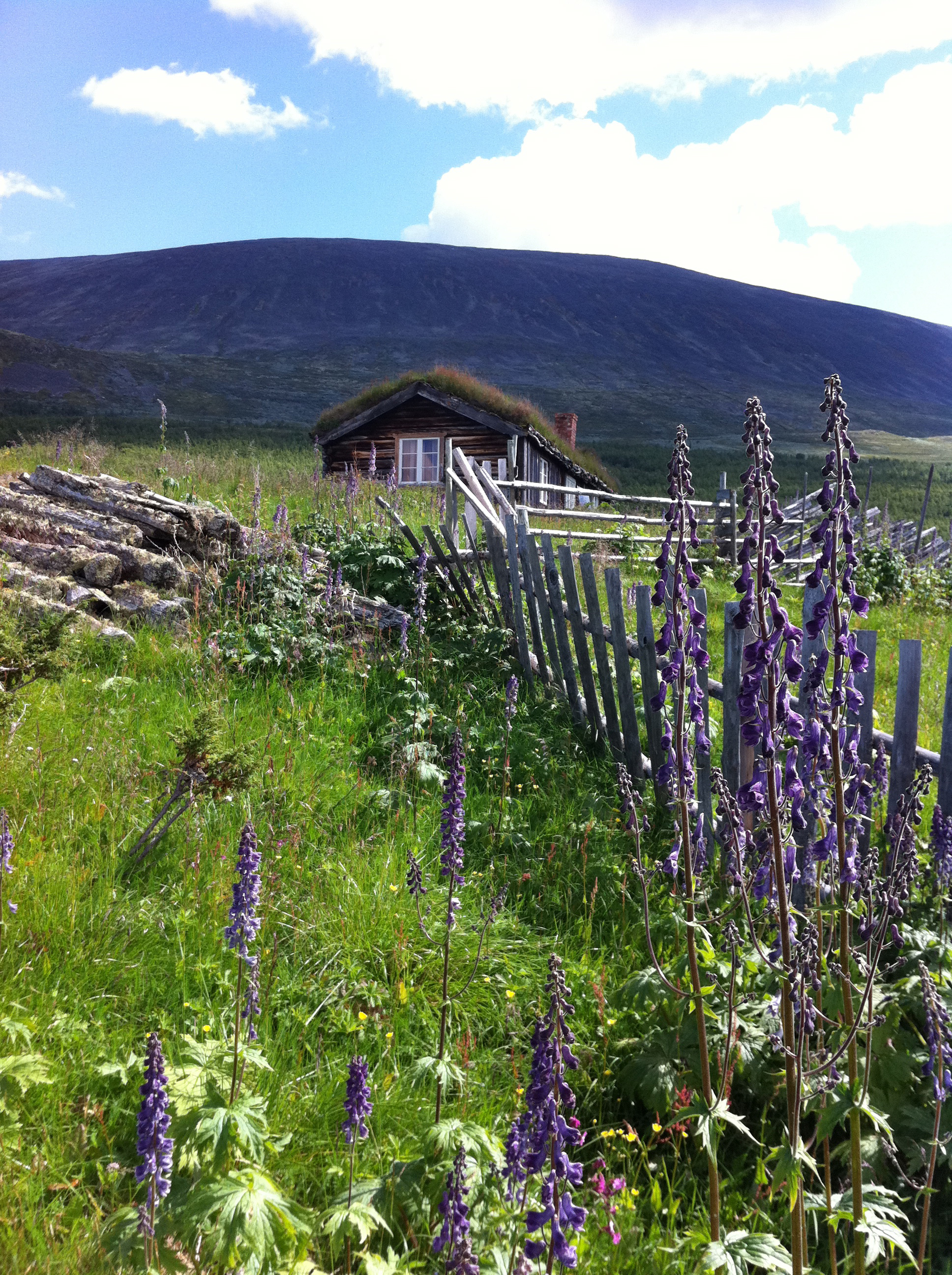
- Part of the summer mountain pastures in Heidal - near the mountain Heidalsmuen

Highest point
- Elevation: 1,745 m (5,725 ft)
- Prominence: 961 m (3,153 ft)
- Isolation: 24.5 km (15.2 mi) to Sikkilsdalshøa
- Coordinates: 61°38′04″N 9°20′15″E

Geography
- Interactive map of the mountain
- Location: Innlandet, Norway

Heidalsmuen or Mukampen is a mountain in Sel Municipality in Innlandet county, Norway. The 1,745-metre (5,725 ft) tall mountain is located between the Jotunheimen and Rondane mountains. The mountain sits about 20 kilometres (12 mi) southwest of the town of Otta, on the south side of the Heidal valley. The mountain is surrounded by several other notable mountains including Saukampen to the east, Refjellet to the west, and Thokampen and Pillarguri to the northeast.

== See also ==
- List of mountains of Norway by height
