= Cultural Heritage Act (Norway) =

1978 Norwegian law protecting heritage sites and cultural environments

Cultural Heritage Act (Lov om kulturminner)
- Territorial extent: Norway
- Passed: June 9, 1978
- Commenced: February 15, 1979

The Cultural Heritage Act (Norwegian: Lov om kulturminner or kulturminneloven) of 1978 is a Norwegian law that protects heritage sites and cultural environments. The structures and spaces that it covers are deemed to have cultural or architectural value. The act includes heritage such as structures and sites, sometimes the area around a monument, protected structures, boats, shipwrecks, and cultural environments. The act describes what automatically enjoys cultural heritage protection and what may be protected under an individual decision.

== Content ==
In line with Section 1 of the Cultural Heritage Act, the purpose of the law is to protect "cultural heritage and cultural environments in their uniqueness and variety ... both as part of our cultural heritage and identity and as part of the overall environment and resource management. It is a national responsibility to safeguard these resources as research source material and as an enduring basis for present and future generations' experience, awareness, enjoyment. and activities. When another law contains decisions that affect cultural heritage, emphasis shall be placed on the intention of this act."

In line with Section 2 of the act, cultural heritage is "all traces of human activity in our physical environment, including places associated with historical events, beliefs, and traditions. Cultural environments refer to areas where cultural heritage is part of a larger entity or context. The rules on cultural heritage and cultural environments shall apply insofar as they are applicable to botanical, zoological, or geological features that are associated with cultural and historical values." Important natural assets can add weight to the assessment of conservation value.

Originally the concern lay in protecting individual cultural heritage as a source of knowledge about the Norway's oldest history. Gradually, the focus expanded to include protection of larger collections of artifacts and the overall physical environment. Both academic disciplines and politicians recognized the importance of the cultural heritage context and its association with the landscape, as a result of which today the Cultural Heritage Act provides for protecting larger areas where cultural heritage is part of a larger entity or context (Section 20).

The law prohibits modification of automatically protected cultural heritage monuments and sites. This entails a prohibition on activities that may damage, destroy, dig up, move, change, conceal, or otherwise inappropriately change the appearance of such heritage or create a danger that this could happen (Section 3). Permission for any such activity must be obtained from the Norwegian Directorate for Cultural Heritage or county municipality (mainly through the Planning and Building Act).

== History ==
In 1897, the first bill on the preservation of memorials from the past was submitted to the Norwegian Parliament, and in 1905 the "Law on Protection and Preservation of Ancient Monuments" was adopted. The law gave automatic protection to all cultural relics from the time before the Norwegian Reformation in 1537, and it safeguarded antiquities and prehistoric artifacts by regulating who was allowed to excavate artifacts and who had ownership of antiquities. The national archaeological museums took responsibility for managing archaeological monuments and sites. Previously such heritage was under private ownership, and a large number of graves were excavated or removed by amateurs. This had resulted in a period of destruction of a number of ancient monuments, and antiquities were sold both in Norway and abroad. This led some politicians and professionals to see the importance of statutory protection of historical monuments.

In 1927 a law was adopted to preserve buildings and structures over 100 years old or that were of particular historical interest to the country. These protection provisions were then combined in an act of June 29, 1951 on historical artifacts and accounted for along with the original law from 1905 in the new "Law on Historical Artifacts." The law was later replaced by the Cultural Heritage Act of June 9, 1978. This was later amended in 1992, 2000, 2001, 2004, and 2009.
