= Øreting =

Øreting (Øretinget, Øyrating; Old Norse: Eyraþing), was a Thing in Trøndelag, Norway. Øreting was located at Øra, where the river Nidelva mouths into the Trondheimsfjord in the modern city of Trondheim.

Things were representative assemblies at which delegates from the various districts in each region met to award legal judgments and pass laws. Øreting was a common assembly for eight provinces in Trøndelag, and developed into an assembly where the King of Norway was proclaimed. Hailing of a new king, (Norwegian: Hylling), was an ancient Norse custom. Snorri Sturluson mentions in his sagas that Harald Fairhair, the first King of Norway, was hailed at the Øreting assembly. His son Haakon the Good was hailed King of the realm at the assembly in 935.

== Related Reading ==
- Andersen, Per Sveaas (1977) Samlingen av Norge og kristningen av landet : 800–1130 (Oslo: Universitetsforlaget) ISBN 8200024121
- Larson, Laurence Marcellus (2011) The Earliest Norwegian Laws (The Lawbook Exchange, Ltd) ISBN 9781584779254
