= Norwegian County Road 255 =

Road in Innlandet, Norway

County Road 255

- Map of the road in western Innlandet (old Oppland county)

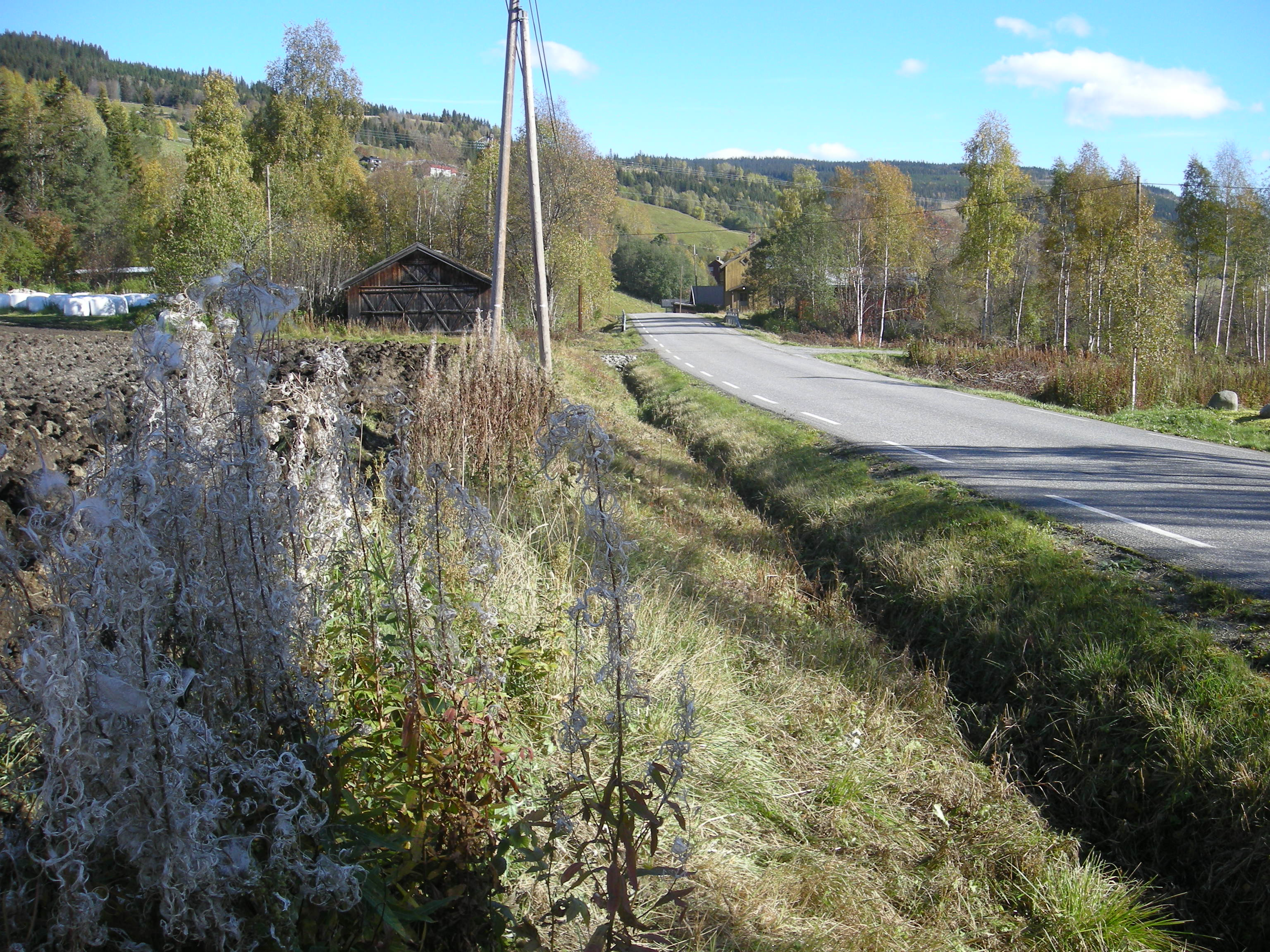
- County Road 255 in Nedre Svatsum in Gausdal

Route information
- Length: 108.4 km (67.4 mi)

Major junctions
- North end: Fv319 Vinstra
- Fv417 at Sorperoa; E6 at Sjoa; Fv425 at Skåbu; Fv346 at Øvre Svatsum; Fv346 at Brennmoen; Fv204 at Forset; Fv315 at Linflå; Fv254 at Segalstad bru Fv315 at Follebu; Fv315 at Rudsbygd; Fv319 at Steinkista; Fv253 at Jorekstad; E6 at Hovemoen
- South end: Fv312 Lillehammer

Location
- Country: Norway
- Counties: Innlandet

Highway system
- Roads in Norway; National Roads; County Roads

County Road 255 (Norwegian: Fylkesvei 255) is a 108.4-kilometer (67.4 mi) road in Innlandet County, Norway. It runs from town of Vinstra in Nord-Fron Municipality to the junction with European route E6, just north of the town of Lillehammer in Lillehammer Municipality.

The road is being improved (it is being widened and a pedestrian path and bicycle path are being added) between Hovemoen (north of Lillehammer) and Segalstad bru and a connection is being built from Hovemoen to Storhove.

Before January 1, 2010 the route was a national road. It was reclassified as a county road in line with a reform transferring such routes to the counties.
