= Heidal Church =

Church in Innlandet, Norway

- Heidal kyrkje
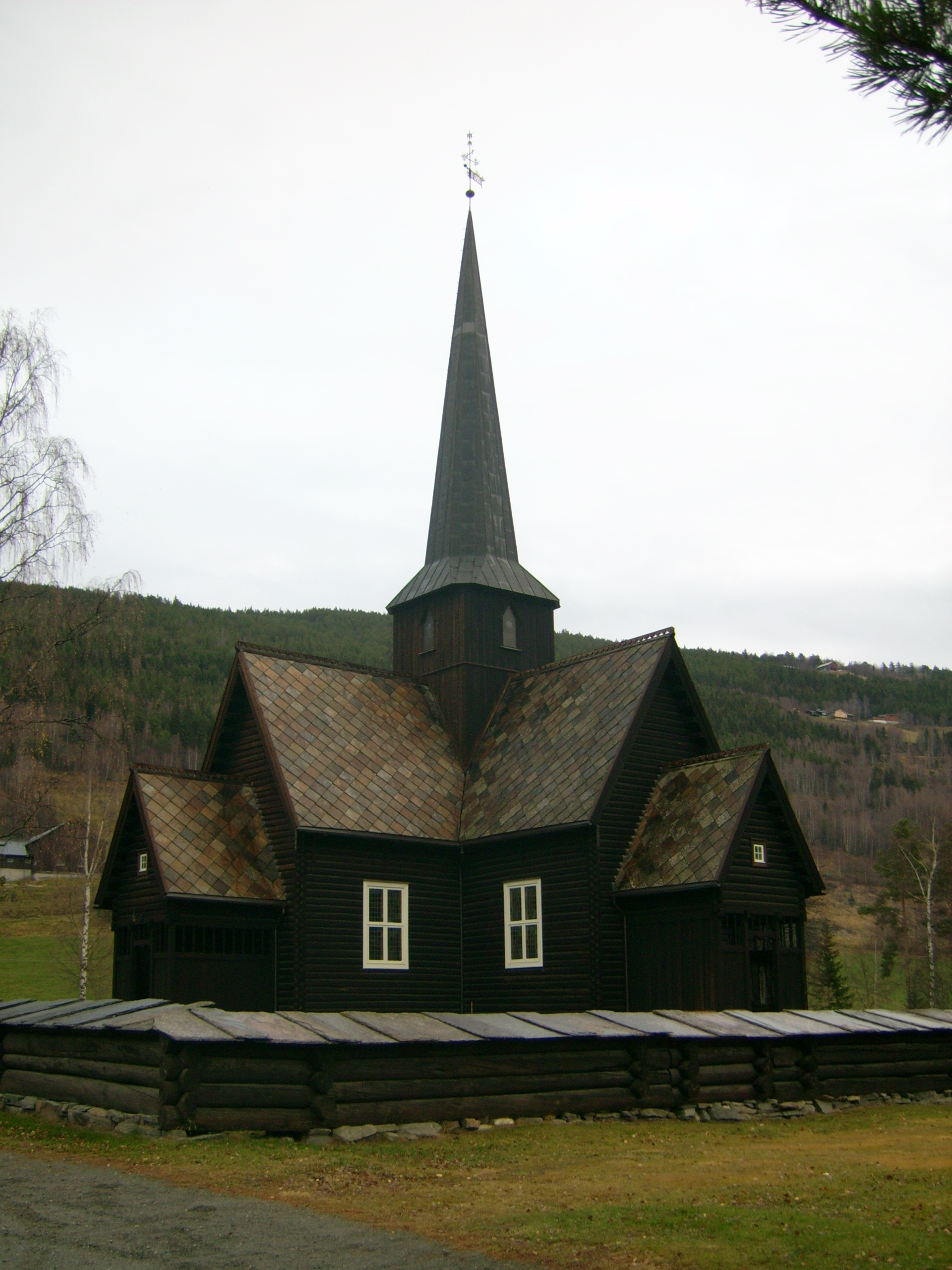
- View of the church
- Heidal Church
- 61°44′50″N 9°19′51″E
- Location: Sel Municipality, Innlandet
- Country: Norway
- Denomination: Church of Norway
- Previous denomination: Catholic Church
- Churchmanship: Evangelical Lutheran

History
- Status: Parish church
- Founded: 11th century
- Consecrated: 8 June 1941

Architecture
- Functional status: Active
- Architect: Bredo Berntsen
- Architectural type: Cruciform
- Completed: 1941 (85 years ago)

Specifications
- Capacity: 292
- Materials: Wood

Administration
- Diocese: Hamar bispedømme
- Deanery: Nord-Gudbrandsdal prosti
- Parish: Heidal
- Norwegian Cultural Heritage Site
- Type: Church
- Status: Protected
- ID: 84524

Heidal Church (Norwegian: Heidal kyrkje) is a parish church of the Church of Norway in Sel Municipality in Innlandet county, Norway. It is located in the village of Bjølstad, in Heidal, a side valley of the main Gudbrandsdalen valley. It is the church for the Heidal parish which is part of the Nord-Gudbrandsdal prosti (deanery) in the Diocese of Hamar. The brown, wooden church was built in a cruciform design in 1941 using plans drawn up by the architect Bredo Berntsen. The church seats about 292 people.

The church, cemetery, and Bjølstad Chapel are encircled by a sturdy double-layered timber-framed wall that is approximately 1 metre (3 ft 3 in) tall. The wall has a slate roof on top.

== History ==
The history of this church is rather complicated with several church sites and various buildings that have served the congregation over the centuries. The first church in Heidal was a wooden stave church that is said to have been built during the first half of the 11th century. The church was originally located at Nørdre Prestgard in Bjølstad, about 2 kilometres (1.2 mi) to the northwest of the present church site. The oldest sources connect it with the Christianization of Norway. The discovery of gravestones and remains there also indicates that there was a cemetery at the site of the old church.

Probably around 1531 (definitely during the 1500s), the old stave church was moved to the Bjølstad Farm, about 0.5 kilometres (0.31 mi) to the west of the old church site. Tradition says that the old church was moved because of gross desecration of the churchyard. There is no evidence as to what this was, but it caused the parish to move the church to a neighboring farm. Eventually the church became too small, and a new timber-framed nave was built to replace the old stave church nave. The new nave measured approximately 6.95 by 6.65 metres (22.8 ft × 21.8 ft). Apparently the choir from the stave church was retained. By 1675, the old choir was rotting and in need of replacement, so the choir was replaced with a new timber-framed choir and sacristy on the same site. Some of the materials from the old church were reused in this remodeling project. Some of the reused beams and doorposts in the church were the most visible remnants from the earliest church, which date back to the 1000s. The doorposts are decorated with some of Norway's oldest carvings.

By the 1700s, the church had started to fall into disrepair and was not in great condition. In 1723, the church was sold at the Norwegian church auction when the King sold off all the churches to help pay debts from the Great Northern War. The new church owner paid 20 riksdaler for the church building and 8 0 riksdaler for the land. In 1754, a new church was built about 2.5 kilometres (1.6 mi) to the east of the old church. It was consecrated on 11 March 1754. It was a timber-framed cruciform building. Jakob Klukstad designed the new altarpiece, pulpit, and crucifix, but many other interior furnishings were moved from the old church to the new church. The new church was known as the Tabor Church or Heidal Church (the name Tabor refers to Mount Tabor from the Bible). After the new church was taken into use, the old church at Bjølstad became redundant and was no longer used.

On 26 July 1933, the old church burned down due to a lightning strike. Most of the interior art and furnishings were lost in the fire, except for some silver candlesticks and metal crucifixes. A new church was built on the same site from 1937 to 1941. The new church was designed to be as close a copy to the original as possible, except that it would be a little larger. Bredo Berntsen was hired to design the building and Knut Villa was hired as the lead builder. The new building is a timbered wooden cruciform church (like most of the churches in the Gudbrandsdalen valley. The church has three second floor seating galleries: the organ is located in the gallery over the entrance. The other two galleries are outfitted with benches. The new church was consecrated on 8 June 1941 (one of very few churches in Norway that was consecrated during World War II).

== Interior art ==
The church is richly decorated, largely consisting of carved acanthus elements. The woodcarvings in the church were created by three local woodcarvers: Mattias Fjerdingren, Anders Johnsgard, and Paul Sørhaugen. Edvard Bakkom from Vågå Municipality created the sculptures. The main image on the altarpiece shows Christ crucified. To the side of the cross stand Jesus's mother Mary and the disciple John. This central image is flanked by Moses holding the Tables of the Law and Aaron clothed as a high priest. At the top of the altarpiece, Christ is depicted holding a victory banner. This banner in Heidal Church is painted with a white cross on a red background instead of a red cross on a white background, as is customary. This creates the impression that the resurrected Christ is holding a Danish banner.

The pulpit is covered with carvings, as are the end pieces on all the pews. The ceiling painting under the church's tower shows the Four Evangelists: Matthew, Mark, Luke, and John. The Eye of Providence is painted above the chancel. Two cherubs blowing horns are painted above the organ.

== Bjølstad Chapel ==
The church was located at Bjølstad from the 1500s until it was closed in 1754 after the new Heidal Church was completed. After its closure, it was used as a barn for quite some time. In 1786, records show that it was still located on the farm, but that it had been moved and that it was decaying. The tower and sacristy were removed at some point as well. In 1820, the farm owner moved the somewhat dilapidated building to the embankment below the farm. In 1933, the building was completely dismantled and put into storage. The materials were gifted to the community with the plan that they could be used to reconstruct the old church as a museum.

From 1956 to 1965, the materials from the old Bjølstad Church (Bjølstad kirke) were used to rebuild the old church about 40 metres (130 ft) southeast of the current church, adjacent to the graveyard that encircled the church. In addition to the doorposts from the 1000s, it preserves other old elements: the pulpit, a crucifix, the tower, and the bell. Its altar, which was painted by Borgar Hauglid at the time that the church was reassembled in 1962, depicts the resurrected Christ with the banner of victory. The decoration of the church's interior is otherwise modest. The new building was named Bjølstad Chapel (Bjølstad kapell) and it is able to accommodate 120 people. It is used for scheduled worship services only a few times a year.

== Media gallery ==
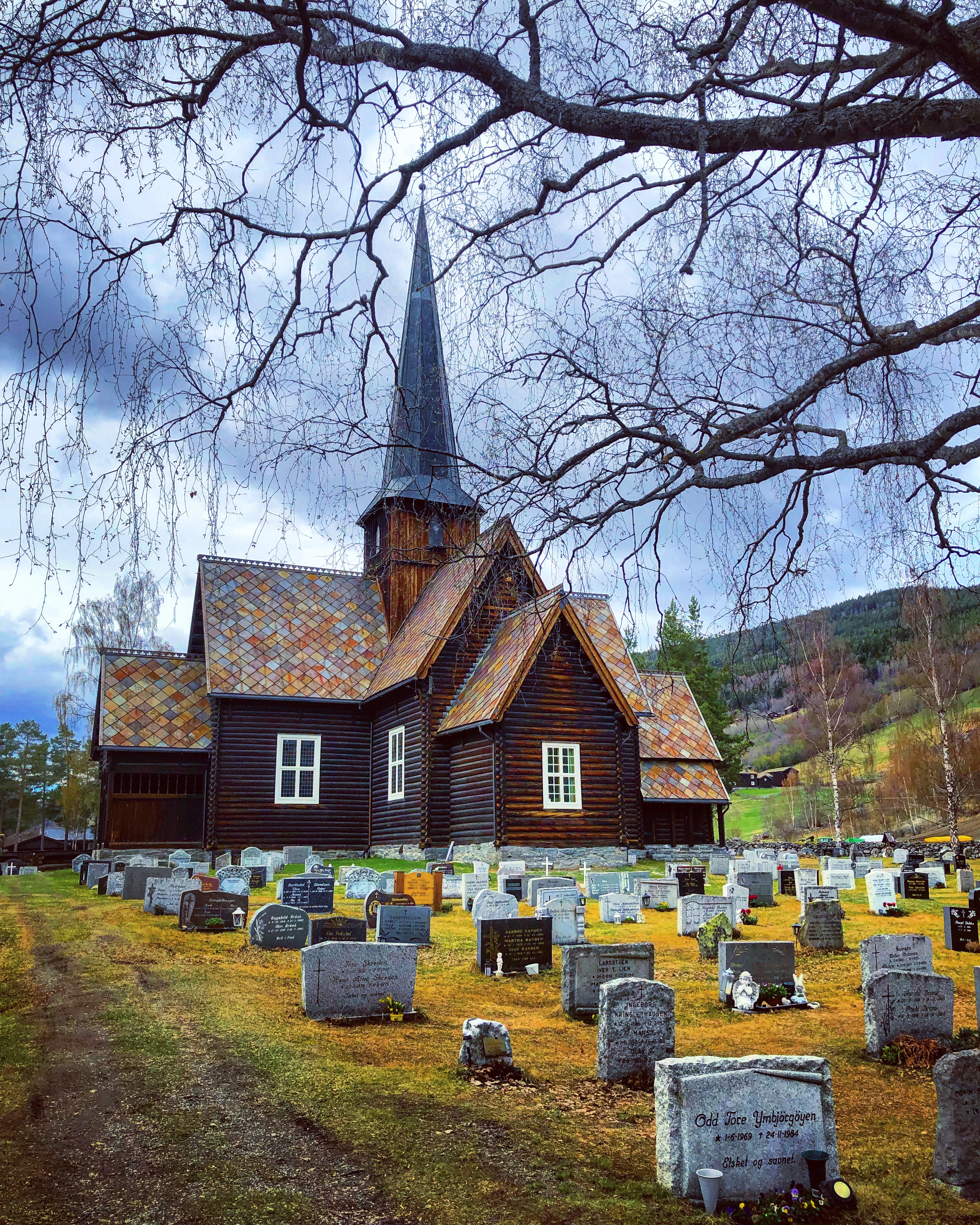
Exterior of the church.

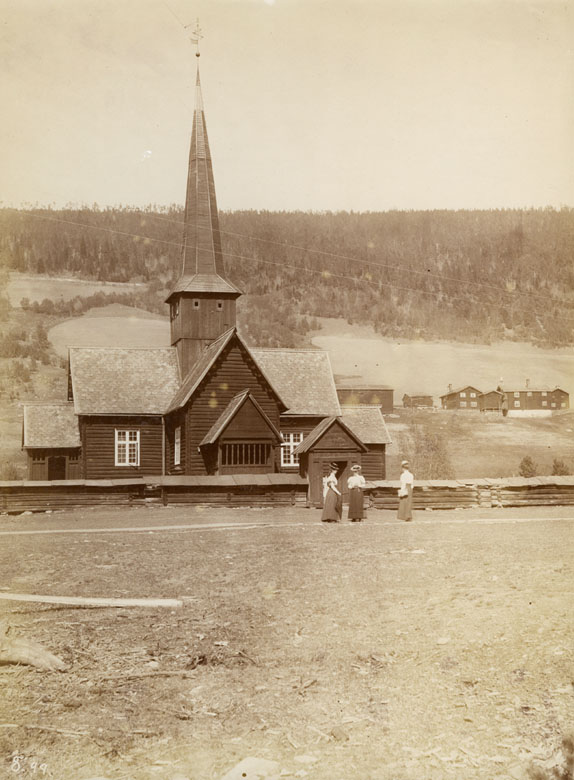
Exterior of the church.

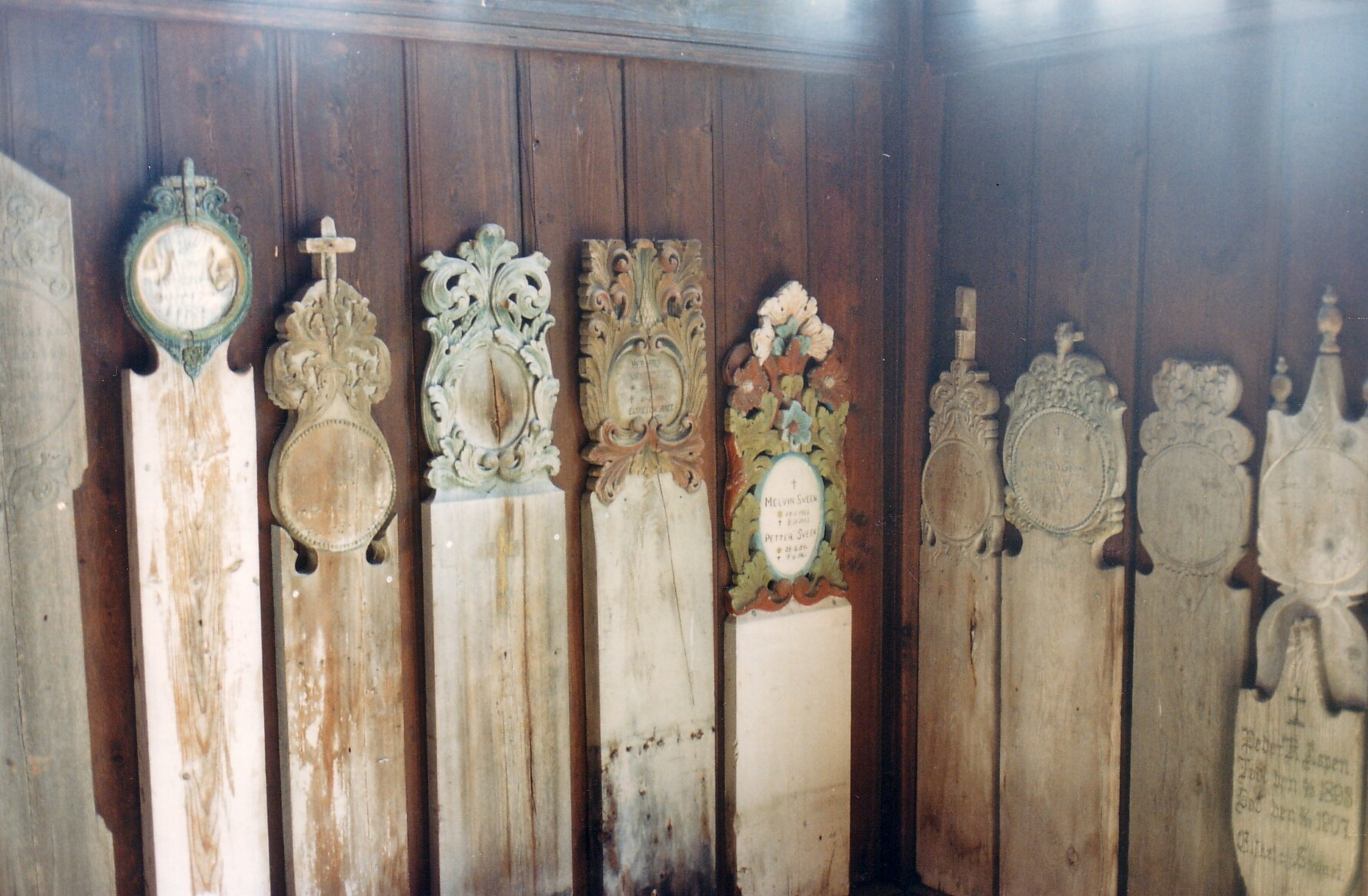
Historic grave markers from Heidal

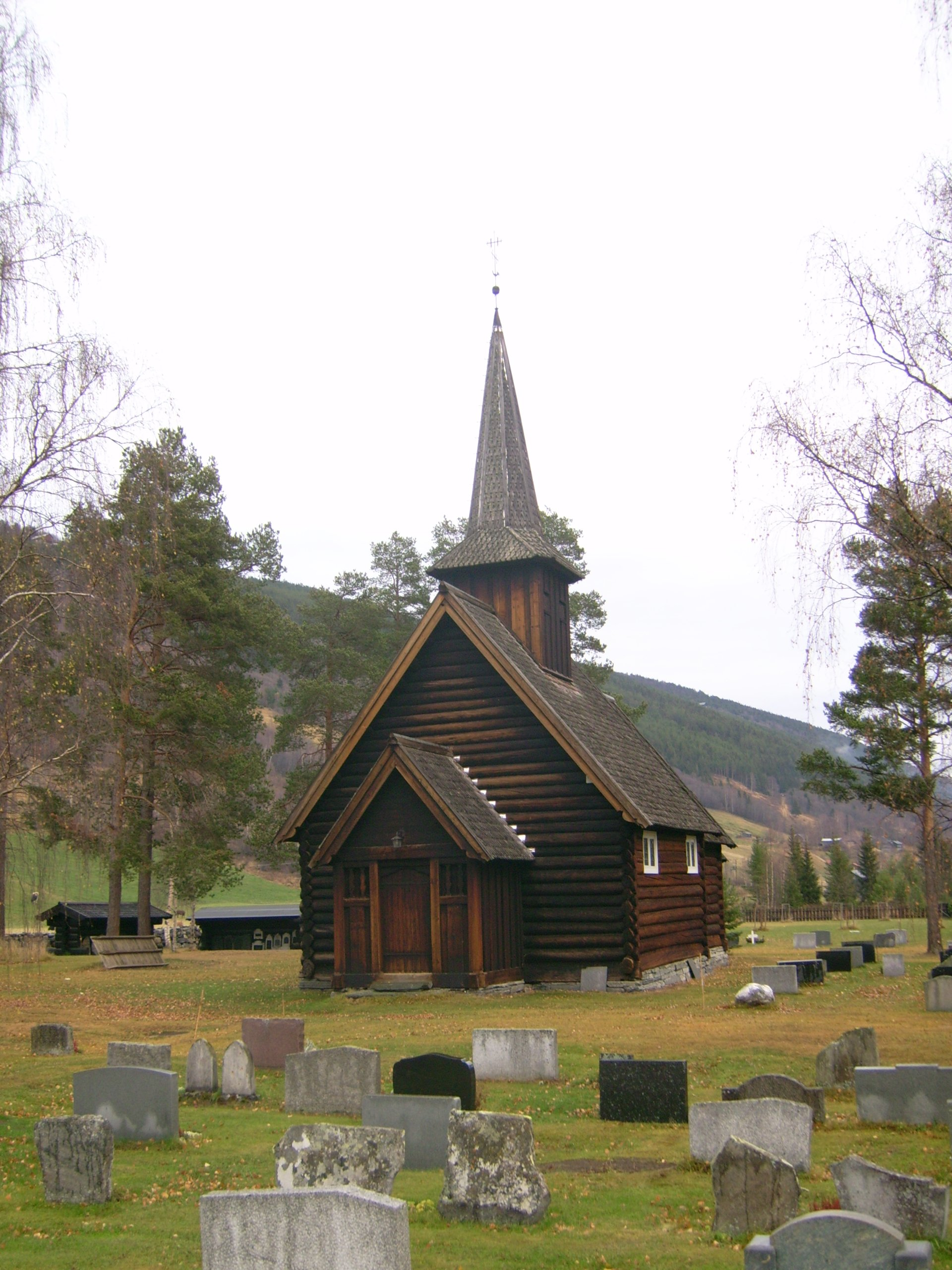
The historic Bjølstad Chapel sits on the grounds of the church

== See also ==
- List of churches in Hamar
