= Anders Uchermann-Sandvig =

Norwegian newspaper editor

Anders Uchermann-Sandvig (21 December 1898 – 25 November 1966) was a Norwegian newspaper editor.

He was born in Lillehammer as a son of dentist and museum founder Anders Sandvig, best known for having founded Maihaugen, an innovative regional ethnological and architectural museum documenting the vernacular architecture of Gudbrandsdalen. Uchermann-Sandvig mainly spent his first decade in the press in Oppland and Hedmark, taking on the subeditor position at Østerdalens Avis in 1920. He was a journalist in Vestopland from 1921, before returning to Østerdalens Avis in 1922.

He was a journalist in the newspapers Drammens Blad and Buskerud og Vestfold from 1923 to 1924, then a parliamentary correspondent for a consortium of Agrarian newspapers the next year. In 1926 he briefly served as editor-in-chief of Østfold Tidende, then a journalist in Østlendingen until he became editor-in-chief of Lillehammer Tilskuer in 1927. From 1930 he took the step down to subeditor of both Lillehammer Tilskuer and Gudbrandsdølen, and then worked as editor-in-chief of Skiensfjordens Presse from 1931 to 1936. During his time in Telemark, he chaired Telemark Press Association from 1932 to 1936 and was a deputy board member of the Norwegian Press Association. He was also a secretary of the Conservative Party in Oppland during his time there.

In 1936 he came to Oslo as a journalist in Morgenbladet, changing position to subeditor in Aftenposten in 1946. He also edited two smaller newspapers on the side, first Den Borgerlige Arbeider from 1938 to 1940, later Ullern Avis from 1948 to 1956.

After retiring from the press, he resided in Mesnali in Lillehammer. He died in November 1966.
