= Kristin Lavransdatter =

Trilogy of historical novels by Sigrid Undset

Kristin Lavransdatter (The Wreath, The Wife, The Cross)
- 1935 Knopf edition
- Author: Sigrid Undset
- Original title: Kristin Lavransdatter (Kransen, Husfrue, Korset)
- Translator: Charles Archer (in three volumes, 1923–27); with J.S. Scott (Kransen only); Tiina Nunnally (in three volumes, 1997–2000)
- Cover artist: Matthew Joseph Peak
- Language: Norwegian
- Genre: Historical fiction, family saga
- Publisher: Aschehoug
- Publication date: 1920, 1921, 1922
- Publication place: Norway
- ISBN: 0-394-43262-2
- OCLC: 17486375
- Preceded by: The Master of Hestviken

Kristin Lavransdatter is a trilogy of historical novels written by Sigrid Undset. The individual novels are Kransen (The Wreath), first published in 1920, Husfrue (The Wife), published in 1921, and Korset (The Cross), published in 1922. Kransen and Husfrue were translated from the original Norwegian as The Bridal Wreath and The Mistress of Husaby, respectively, in the first English translation by Charles Archer and J. S. Scott.

This work formed the basis of Undset receiving the 1928 Nobel Prize in Literature, which was awarded to her "principally for her powerful descriptions of Northern life during the Middle Ages". Her work is much admired for its historical and ethnological accuracy.

== Plot ==
The cycle follows the life of Kristin Lavransdatter, a fictitious Norwegian woman living in the 14th century. Kristin grows up in the Gudbrandsdalen valley (in what is now Sel Municipality in Innlandet county), the daughter of a well-respected and affluent farmer. She experiences a number of conflicts in her relationships with her parents, and her husband, in medieval Norway.

=== The Wreath ===
Kristin Lavransdatter is the daughter of Lavrans, a charismatic, respected nobleman in a rural area of Norway, and his wife Ragnfrid, who has depression after the loss of three infant sons and the crippling of her younger daughter Ulvhild in an accident. Raised in a loving and devoutly religious family, Kristin develops a sensitive but wilful character, defying her family in small and large ways. At an early age, she is exposed to various tragedies. After an attempted rape raises questions about her reputation, she is sent to Nonneseter Abbey, Oslo, a Benedictine nunnery, which proves to be a turning point in her life.

Despite being betrothed to a neighboring landowner's son, Simon Darre, Kristin falls in love with Erlend Nikulaussøn, from the estate of Husaby in Trøndelag. Erlend has been excommunicated by the Catholic Church for openly cohabitating with Eline, the wife of a prominent judge; Eline left her elderly husband to live with Erlend, flouting both religious and social law. They have had two children together, Orm and Margret, who have no legal rights since they were born of an adulterous relationship.

Erlend and Kristin begin a passionate romance which is sealed with Erlend's seduction of Kristin and their eventual complicity in Eline's death, both grievous sins in the eyes of Church and State. Lavrans forbids their relationship, but after three years of Kristin's defiance and the death of Ulvhild, he no longer has the strength to oppose Kristin. He consents to her marriage to Erlend. Erlend and Kristin are formally betrothed, but she becomes pregnant before the wedding. Out of shame, she keeps this a secret from everyone, including Erlend, and is wed with her hair loose and wearing the family bridal crown — privileges reserved for virgin brides.

This section of the trilogy is named for the golden wreath Kristin wears as a young girl, which is reserved for virgins of noble family. It symbolizes her innocent life before she meets Erlend; after he seduces her, she is no longer entitled to wear it, but does so out of fear of her sin coming to light.

=== The Wife ===
The second book opens with Kristin's arrival at Husaby. She is suffering from remorse for her sins and fears for her unborn child. Her relationship with Erlend is no longer the careless one of days past, as she can see that he is impetuous and wasteful of his possessions although his passion for her is unchanged. She gives birth to a son, Nikulaus (Naakkve for short), who to her surprise is healthy and whole in spite of the circumstances of his conception.

After confessing to her parish priest, Kristin undertakes a pilgrimage to St. Olav's shrine in Trondheim to do penance and give thanks for her son's birth. She donates her golden wreath, which she wore undeservedly after her seduction by Erlend, to the shrine.

Over the following years, Kristin and Erlend have six more sons together and Kristin becomes the head of the household. She must deal with her husband's weaknesses while running the estate, raising her children as well as those of Erlend's former mistress, and trying to remain faithful to her religion. During these years, her parents die and her remaining sister Ramborg is married to Simon Darre, although he secretly still loves Kristin. Ramborg is only fourteen when she is married, but has pushed for this wedding as she has loved Simon since her childhood. She understands little about what marriage means, particularly to a man who has been in love with someone else for many years.

Erlend becomes a leader in a plot to depose the king and install the last king's son on the throne. During this time, in part to spite Kristin's coldness towards him, he has a one-night affair with another woman, who finds letters on him related to the plot and turns him in to the authorities. The plot, which would likely have succeeded and elevated Erlend and his sons among the nobility, is thus foiled by Erlend's impetuousness. Through the efforts of Kristin's former fiancé, Simon, his life is spared but his property must be forfeited to the crown. Husaby is lost to them and Erlend's sons are left without an inheritance. The only property left to the family is Kristin's childhood farm, Jørundgård.

=== The Cross ===
Kristin, Erlend, and their children return to Jørundgård but fail to gain the acceptance of the community. Hardship forges strong family bonds and highlights Kristin's sense of obligations to her family and her faith. However, she and Erlend become estranged from Simon and Ramborg after Erlend and Ramborg become aware that Simon has never ceased to love Kristin.

Kristin becomes increasingly concerned about the future of her sons now that Erlend has lost their inheritance. After a fierce argument on this subject in which she compares him unfavorably with her father, who had preserved his estate and inheritance even as more and more farmers around him were taking on debts and losing their land to the crown, Erlend leaves the manor and settles at Haugen, the former home of his aunt Aashild and the place where she was murdered by her husband.

He and Kristin reunite there briefly during his absence after the dying Simon extracts a promise from Kristin to ask Erlend's forgiveness for her harsh words. They conceive an eighth son together, but Erlend refuses to return to the manor, instead insisting Kristin must move to Haugen to be with him. Kristin is very angry and hurt, and when she gives birth, she names her son Erlend. This is a terrible breach of custom, as local superstition maintains that children must not be named after living relatives or one of the two will die. In this way, she demonstrates that she considers her husband dead to her. The superstition is borne out, as the child weakens from the time he is given his father's name and soon dies.

Due to the jealousy of her foreman's estranged wife, Kristin is publicly accused of adultery and complicity in the death of her child. Her sons rally around her, and Lavrans rides to inform Erlend. Erlend immediately sets out for Jorundgård, but upon his return to the farm he is slain in a confrontation with the locals and dies, without a confession to the priest, in Kristin's arms after asserting her innocence.

After handing the farm over to her third son and his wife, Kristin returns to Trondheim, where she is accepted as a lay member of Rein Abbey. When the Black Death arrives in Norway in 1349, Kristin dedicates herself to nursing the ill. Shortly after she learns that her two eldest sons have succumbed to the plague, she herself succumbs to the plague, but not before performing a final good deed which allows her to die in peace.

=== Related works ===
Undset wrote a tetralogy, The Master of Hestviken, which takes place around the same time as Kristin Lavransdatter. Kristin's parents make a brief appearance in this book, near the end of the part called "The Snake Pit". They are depicted as young married people, playing with their baby son. They are a happy and prosperous couple at their first home in Skog, before Kristin's birth. The unfortunate life of Olav, the main character of "The Master of Hestviken", stands in stark contrast to the happiness and good fortune of the young couple, though Kristin's parents eventually lose all their sons in infancy, and suffer many other misfortunes and sorrows.

== Characters in Kristin Lavransdatter ==
Fictional characters in Sigrid Undset's Kristin Lavransdatter

Kings of Norway and historical characters in Sigrid Undset's Kristin Lavransdatter

- Kristin Lavransdatter, the protagonist
- Lavrans Bjørgulfsson, her father (also referred to as Lavrans Langmandsson)
- Ragnfrid Ivarsdatter, Kristin's melancholy mother.
- Simon Darre (also called Simon Andresson), initially engaged to Kristin, later her brother-in-law
- Erlend Nikulausson, the reckless and handsome man who seduces and marries Kristin
- Ulvhild Lavransdatter, Kristin's younger sister, left chronically ill and unable to walk after an accident
- Ramborg Lavransdatter, Kristin's youngest sister, eventual wife of Simon Darre
- Åashild Gautesdatter of Dovre, a wise woman skilled in magic and the healing arts whom Kristin befriends. She is Erlend's aunt; formerly married unhappily to his uncle Baard Munanson, she is suspected by some of Baard's murder by poison.
- Ingebørg Olavsdotter, a novice in Nonneseter with Kristin, becomes somewhat of a friend
- Arne Gyrdson, Kristin's childhood friend and foster-brother
- Sira Eirik, parish priest at Kristin's childhood home in Jørundgaard
- Brother Edvin, traveling monk, friend and spiritual mentor to Kristin
- Bentein Priestson, grandson of Sira Eirik, attempts to assault Kristin and murders Arne
- Gunnulf Nikulausson, Erlend's brother, a priest
- Lady Gunna, Kristin's neighbor and midwife
- Sira Eiliv, parish priest at Husaby, Erlend's home
- Eline Ormsdatter, Erlend's mistress in his youth
- Orm, son of Erlend and Eline and stepson of Kristin
- Margret, daughter of Erlend and Eline, and stepdaughter of Kristin
- Sunniva Olavsdatter, wife of Thorolf; her brief affair with Erlend has tragic consequences
- Brynhild Fluga (also called Brynhild Jonsdatter), owner of a brothel in Oslo and mother of two of Munan Baardson's children
- Naakve, Bjørgulf, Gaute, Ivar, Skule, Lavrans, Munan, and Erlend, sons of Kristin and Erlend (Ivar and Skule are twins).

Undset also wrote a few historical figures into the novel:

- King Magnus VII (also called Magnus Eiriksson), King of Norway and Sweden 1319–1343
- Lady Ingebørg Haakonsdatter, mother of King Magnus
- Knud Porse, Lady Ingebørg's second husband
- Erling Vidkunsson, "Drotsete" (Regent or High Steward) of Norway 1322–1330 under King Magnus. In the story, he is related to Erlend and Lady Halfrid, and is a lifelong friend of Erlend.
- Munan Baardson, friend of Lady Ingebørg and Knut Porse. In the story he is the son of Åshild and cousin to Erlend.
- Jon and Sigurd Haftorsson, King Magnus's cousins who plotted to overthrow him
- Paal Baardson, Chancellor of Norway 1330, an old antagonist of Erling Vidkunssøn.

== Literary significance and criticism ==
It was the main basis for Undset being awarded the Nobel Prize in Literature.

== English translations ==
Kristin Lavransdatter was first translated into English by Charles Archer in three volumes between 1923 and 1927, with J.S. Scott collaborating with Archer on Kransen. Their translation made heavy use of archaic and stilted English phrasing ("thee", "I trow", "methinks", etc.), intended to reflect the novel's 14th-century setting. Some of the English translation directly reflects the original language - for example 'I trow' was adopted from the Norwegian 'tror' meaning "to believe". Archer and Scott's translation has been widely criticized as clouding Undset's prose, rendering it unnecessarily formal and clumsy. Bruce Bawer, writing in The New York Times, described the translation as "execrable" and "crammed with hoary medievalisms", while a review from the National Book Critics Circle characterized the language as "relentlessly faux". It was also criticized for expurgations, as some scenes, particularly sexually explicit ones, had been omitted or edited. The quality and difficulty of the translation was cited as impeding the adoption of Kristin Lavransdatter into standard literature of the English-speaking world. Some reviewers have positively cited the Archer and Scott translation; Brad Leithauser, writing in The New York Review of Books, said that their language choice "encourage[s] us to transplant the plot into a realm detached from time".

American translator Tiina Nunnally produced a new English translation of the trilogy that was published by Penguin Classics between 1997 and 2000. Many literary critics considered the new version to be superior, particularly for its clarity and reflecting Undset's "straightforward, almost plain style." For her translation of the third book, Korset (The Cross), Nunnally was awarded the PEN Translation Prize in 2001.

- Kransen (1920). The Bridal Wreath, trans. Charles Archer and J.S. Scott (1923); trans. Tiina Nunnally as The Wreath (Penguin, 1997)
- Husfrue (1921). The Mistress of Husaby, trans. Charles Archer (1925); trans. Tiina Nunnally as The Wife (Penguin, 1999)
- Korset (1922). The Cross, trans. Charles Archer (1927); trans. Tiina Nunnally (Penguin, 2000)

== Portrayal of 14th-century Norway ==
Undset's characterizations of the ethnology, geography, and history of 14th-century Norway have held up as archaeological and literary evidence has emerged since its writing. Much of the meticulous accuracy of the portrayals of medieval life derives from Undset's own familiarity with Norse medieval literature and culture (her father, Ingvald Martin Undset, was an archaeologist). The staunch realism of Kristin Lavransdatter stands in contrast to the romanticized presentations of the Middle Ages popularized by Pre-Raphaelites and Arthurian myth.

== Film, TV or theatrical adaptations ==
- Kristin Lavransdatter, 1995, directed by Liv Ullmann

Critics gave it a lukewarm reception at best, and many considered it to be more true to the present than to the medieval era in which it was set. The film covers only the first book of the trilogy. However, as it was viewed by as much as two-thirds of the population, it became one of Norway's most domestically successful films: an important cultural event. The release of the film coincided with rising national interest that centered on Norwegian medieval cultural history, and cemented Kristin Lavransdatter and Sigrid Undset as a part of the Norwegian national identity.

- DVD

Actors: Per Kværnes, Elisabeth Matheson, Anne Kokkinn, Bjørn Jenseg, Erland Josephson
Format: Anamorphic, Color, Dolby, DVD-Video, Subtitled, Widescreen, NTSC
Language: Norwegian
Subtitles: English
DVD Release Date: April 6, 2004
Run Time: 187 minutes

- VHS

Actors: Torunn Lødemel, Astrid Folstad, Paul-Ottar Haga, Kirsti Eline Torhaug, Joachim Calmeyer
Format: Box set, Color, Director's Cut, Special Edition, NTSC
VHS Release Date: February 19, 2002
Run Time: 180 minutes

== Cultural impact ==
- The plot of Kristin Lavransdatter and Sigrid Undset are important elements in The Danish Poet, a 2006 Academy Award-winning animated short film narrated by Liv Ullmann, director of the 1995 film adaptation of the Nobel Prize-winning novel.
