= Garmo Stave Church =

Historic building in Lillehammer, Norway

Coordinates: 61°6′40″N 10°28′34″E

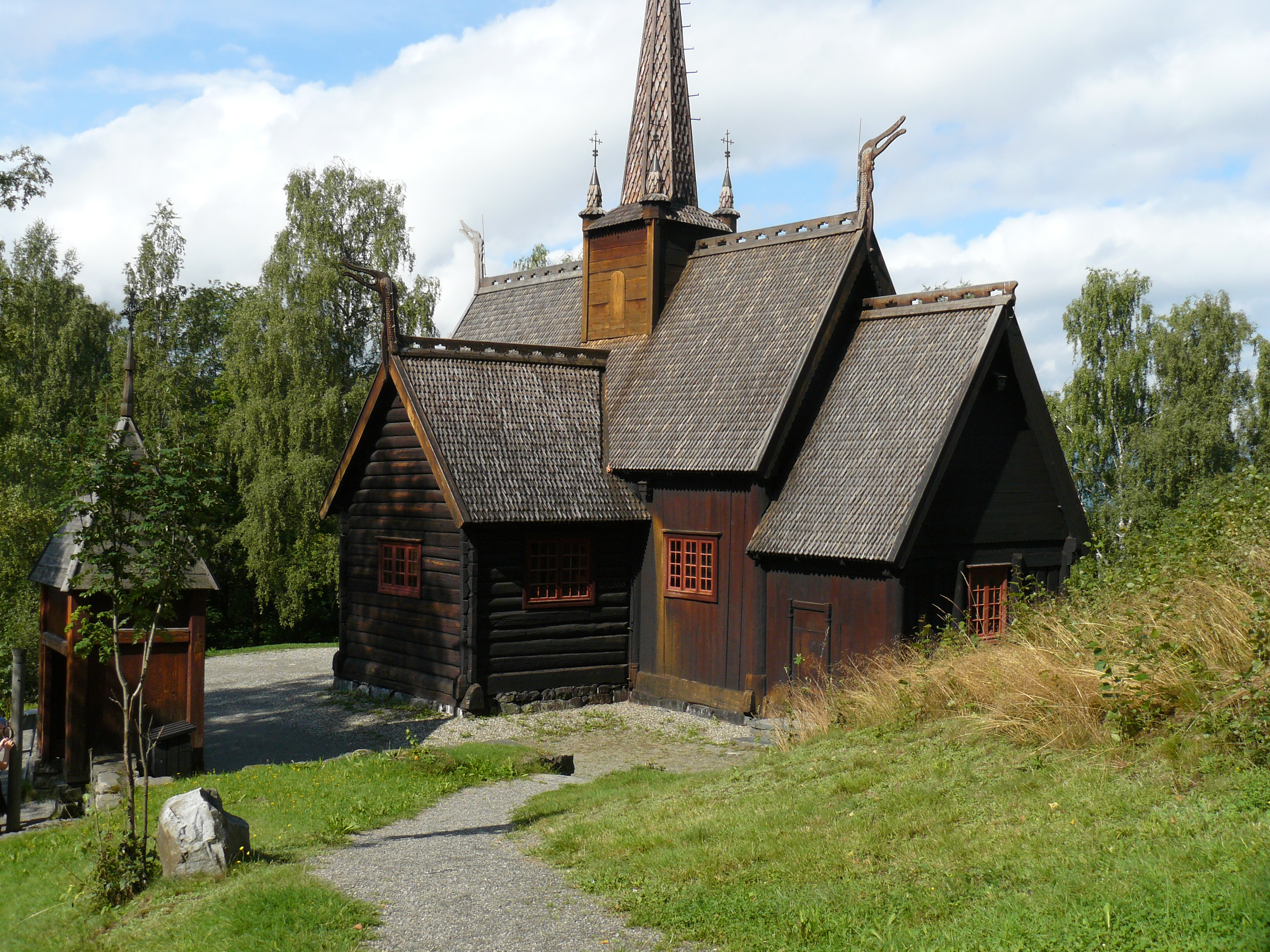
Garmo Stave Church

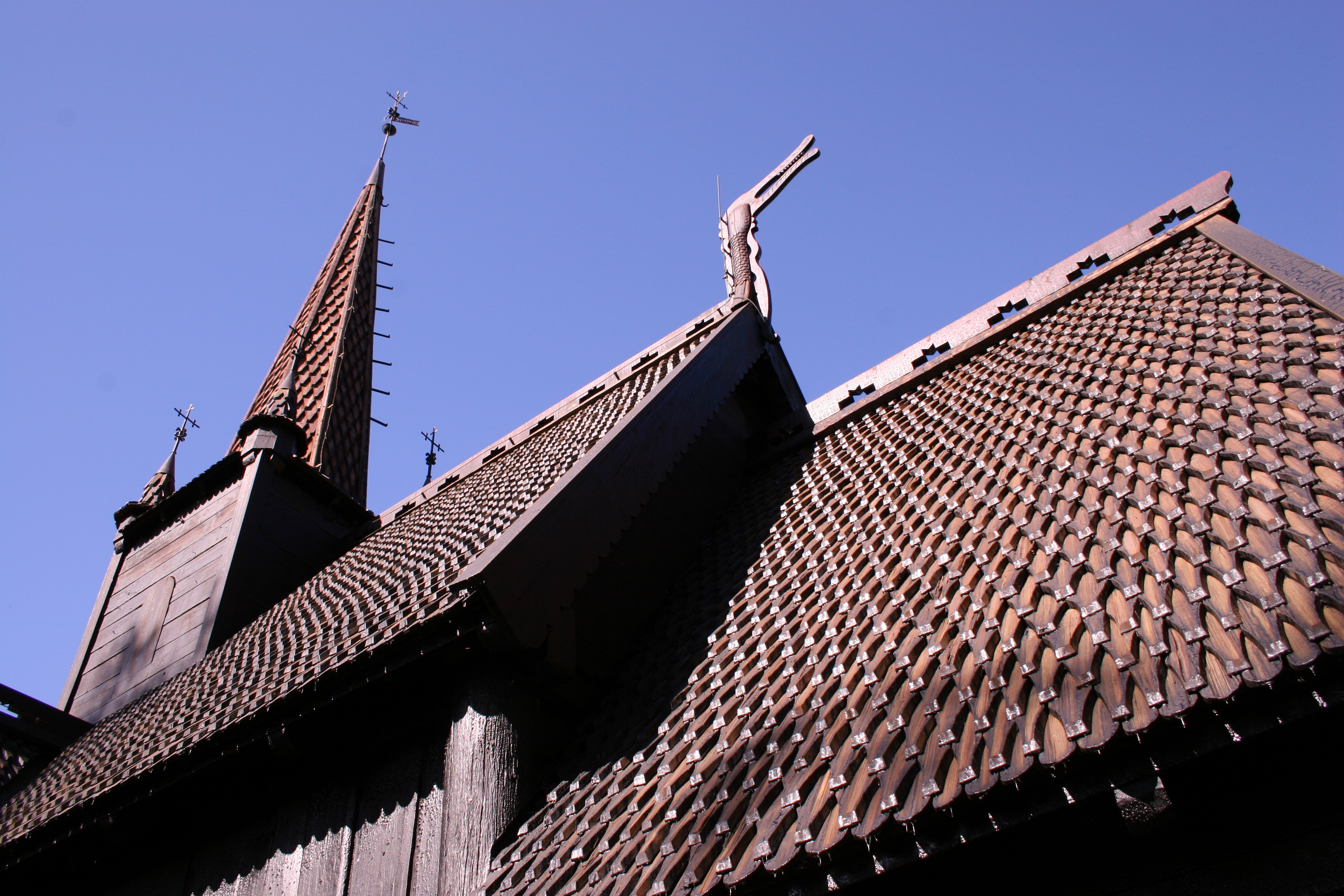
Roof detail

Garmo Stave Church (Garmo stavkyrkje) is a stave church situated at the Maihaugen museum in Lillehammer Municipality in Innlandet county, Norway. Garmo Stave Church at Maihaugen is one of the most visited stave churches in Norway.

== Description ==
Garmo Stave Church originally came from the village of Garmo in Lom Municipality in Innlandet county. It was built circa 1150 on the site of a previous church believed to have been built in 1021 by a Viking chieftain. In 1730, it was expanded into a timber cruciform church.

After Garmo Church (Garmo kyrkje) was built as the new parish church in 1879, the stave church was demolished and the materials sold at auction. In 1882, the church was sold to Anders Sandvig, who disassembled it and brought it to Lillehammer in sections. It was re-erected at Maihaugen in 1920–1921. It is unclear how much of the original materials were used in the reconstruction. The church consists largely of 17th and 18th century inventory. Apart from the claystone baptismal font from the 1100s, all the furnishings in the Garmo Stave Church come from other churches. The pulpit made in 1738 came from Romsdalen. The altarpiece from 1695 came from Lillehammer.

== Gallery ==
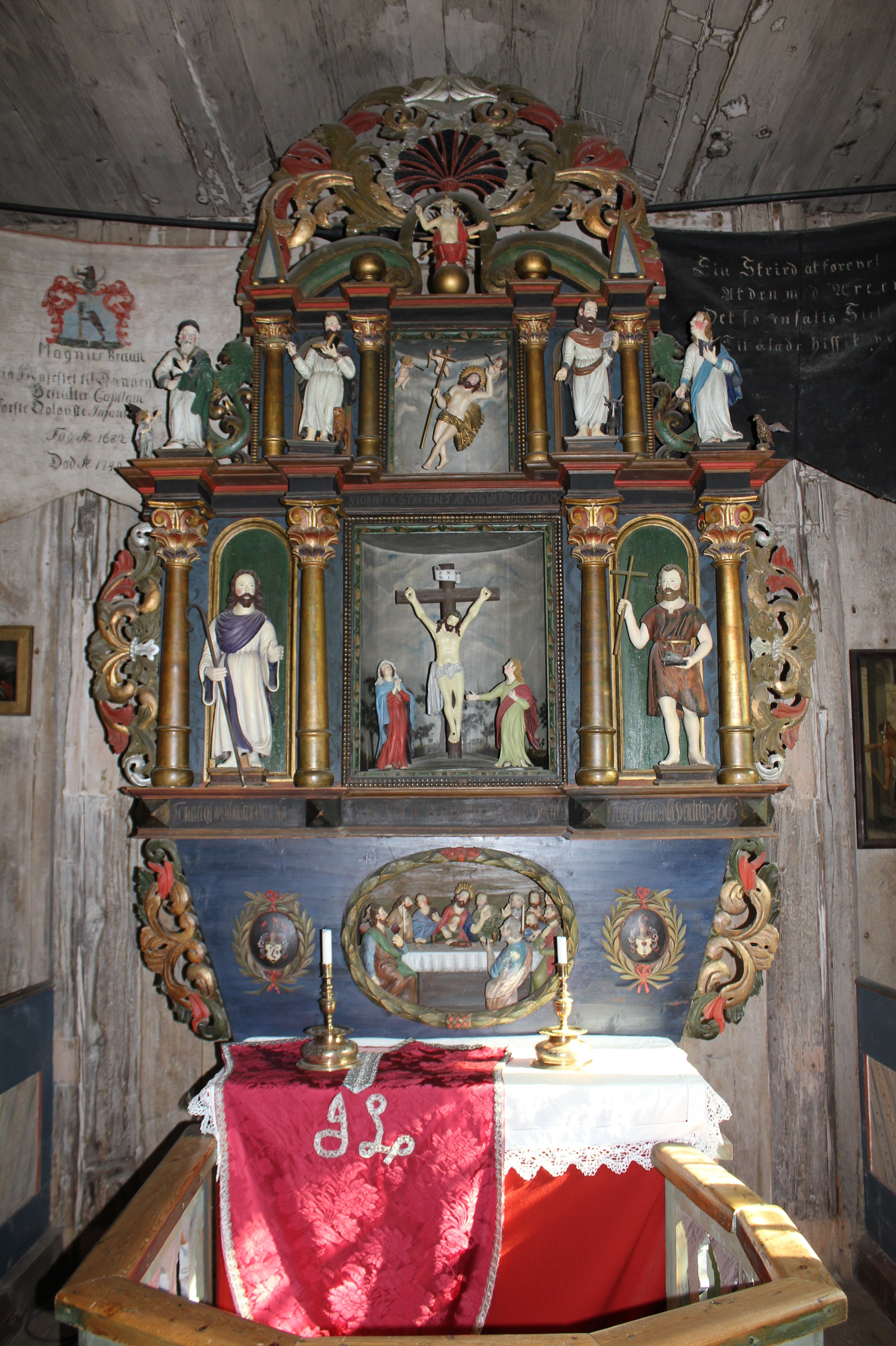
Garmo stavkyrkje – Altar and altarpiece

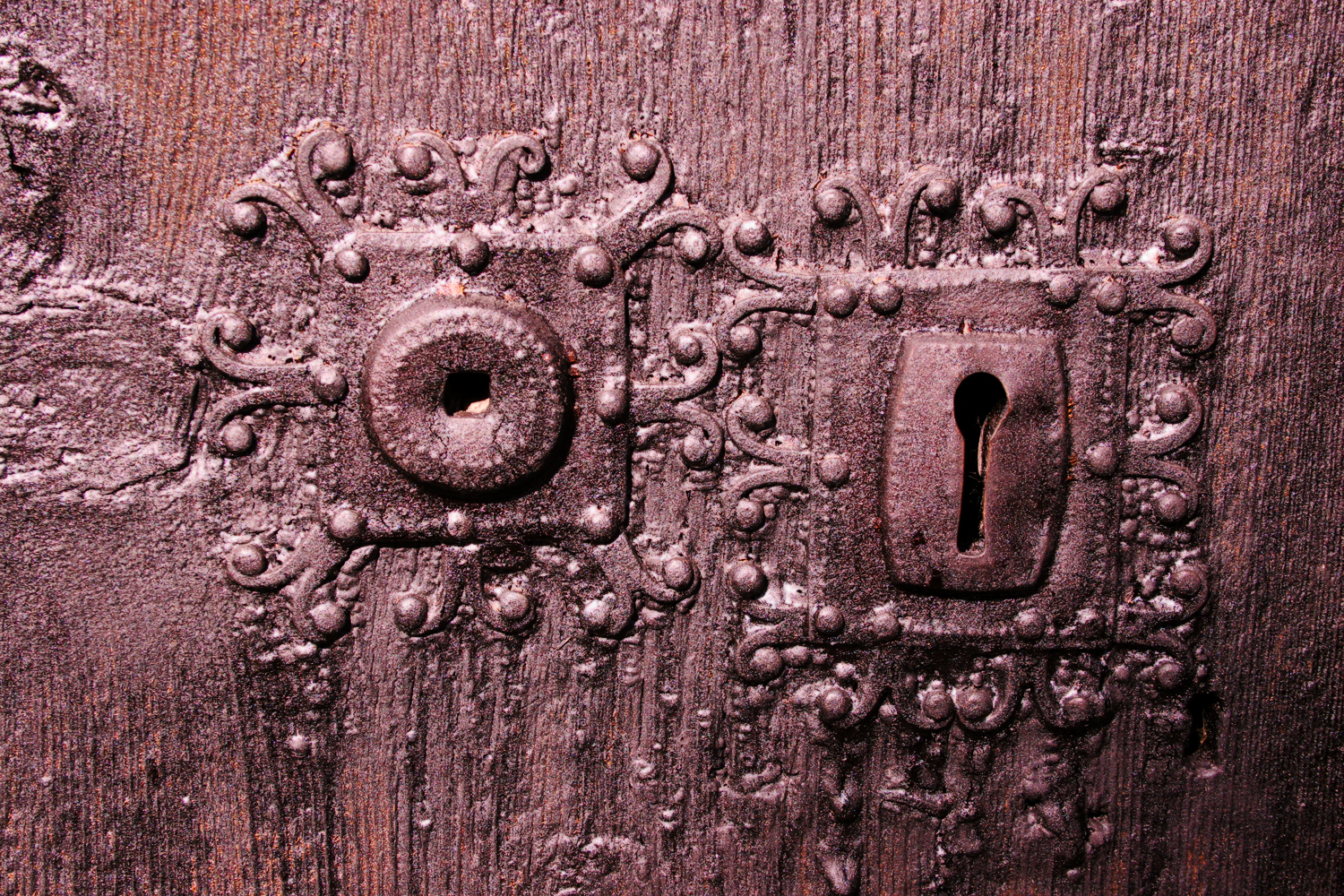
Garmo stavkyrkje –Keyholes

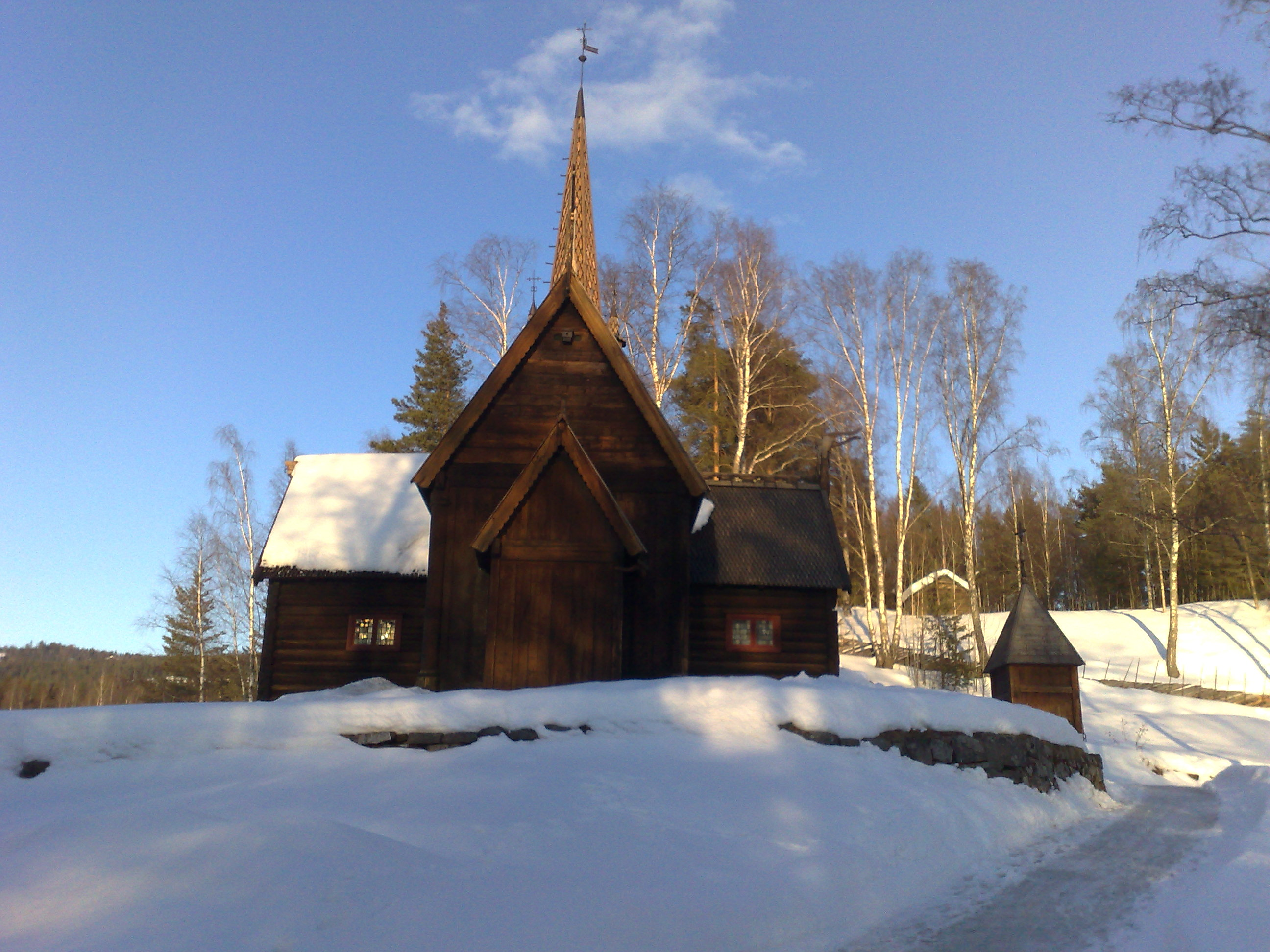
Garmo stavkyrkje – Winter scene

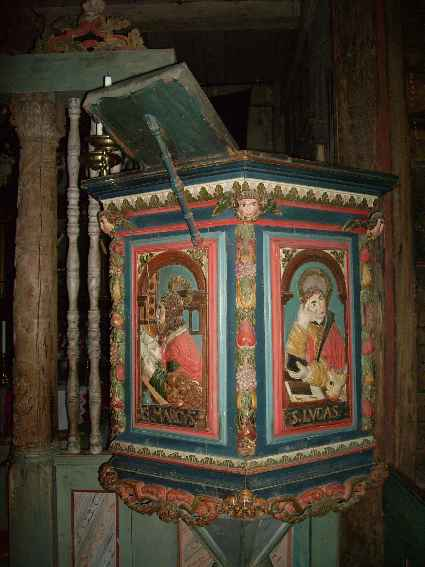
Garmo stavkyrkje –Pulpit

== See also ==
- The Parson's Widow
