= Svarstad (surname) =

Svarstad is a Norwegian surname. Notable people with the surname include:

- Anders Castus Svarstad (1869–1943), Norwegian painter
- Hans Svarstad (1883–1971), Norwegian politician
- Paul Svarstad (1917–1998), Norwegian politician
