= Nan Bentzen Skille =

Nan Helene Bentzen Skille (born 12 February 1945) founder of The Sigrid Undset Society (1997) and author of the first biography in English of the Nobel Prize Laureate (1928) Sigrid Undset (1882–1949). Skille has a Masters in English Literature. She has been active as a promoter of the Norwegian author and Nobel Prize Laureate Sigrid Undset for many years, both through The Sigrid Undset Society, which she led for five years from its founding in 1997, as editor for the periodical Gymnadnia (1997–2003) and as member of the council for the Norwegian Festival of Literature (since 1995).

As a member of the Norwegian Festival of Literature council she became involved in the controversy over Holocaust denier David Irving, who was invited to speak at the 2009 festival. Nan Bentzen Skille publicly opposed the invitation after it was sent, but recommended that the Irving presentation be used to discuss critical issues it represented. She pointed out that Sigrid Undset had been critical of historians who locked into a view without thoughtfully considering opposing views and addressing them. Shortly after the controversy began, the invitation was withdrawn.

Skille presented Undset in the educational film series titled "Nordic Giants", and was project manager for the recording of Undset’s play for miniature theater Østenfor sol og vestenfor måne (East of the Sun and West of the Moon) in 2001. She also coproduced the film Ei blott til lyst (Not Just for Fun) in 2006; the latter is an account of the miniature theatre which a group of Lillehammer artists created in the 1920s.

In 2000 Skille led the initiative to place a plaque on the building in Via Frattina 138 in Rome where Undset lived during two periods of her life. For five years Skille was engaged by Maihaugen Museum to assist with the restoration work at Undset's home, Bjerkebæk, adressa.no Undset’s home in Lillehammer and to document the history of the site. For this she was awarded the Anders Sandvig Museum Stipend in 2000. Skille served for several years a columnist in the Norwegian broadcasting at Oppland, specializing in literature.

== Bibliography ==
- 1977 Fragmentation and Integration. A Critical Study of Doris Lessing, The Golden Notebook- University of Bergen
- 1996 Dattera til Brødrene Brose - children's book, Solum forlag ISBN 82-560-1062-2
- 2003 Innenfor gjerdet. Hos Sigrid Undset på Bjerkebæk - biography, Aschehoug ISBN 978-82-03-22946-6
  - 2009 Inside the Gate. Sigrid Undset's Life at Bjerkebæk - biography (translated by Tiina Nunnally), Aschehoug ISBN 978-82-03-19447-4
- 2004 Maxim Gorkij eller Sigrid Undset? - NRK P2-akademiet, Transit forlag. ISBN 82-7596-152-1(summary)
- 2006 I Sigrid Undsets Ånd Gymnadenia, 2006
- 2007 Tordis Ørjasæter. En formidler i særklasse - minibiography. Prosa nr.6 2007
- 2008 Hvem er Doris Lessing? - Bokvennen 04/2008 ISBN 978-82-7488-187-7
- 2009 Kulturlivets deltagere og tilskuere. Prosa, nr 3, 2009.
- 2018 Inside the Gate. Sigrid Undset's Life at Bjerkebæk - biography (translated by Tiina Nunnally), University of Minnesota Press, ISBN 978-1-5179-0496-8
