= Skille =

Skille is a surname. Notable people with the surname include:

- Jack Skille (born 1987), American ice hockey player
- Jørn Skille (1942–2008), Norwegian civil servant
- Nan Bentzen Skille (born 1945), Norwegian biographer
