= List of The Master of Hestviken characters =

This is a list of characters in Sigrid Undset's tetralogy The Master of Hestviken.

As noted throughout the series, ties of kinship were a major feature of Norwegian social life, conferring various privileges and obligations, and Norwegians at all walks of life took care to keep track even of their more distant kin.

== Olav's family ==
- Family Tree of Olav Audunsson of Hestviken
  Olav Audunsson, the Master of Hestviken
- Audun Ingolfsson, father of Olav
- Cecilia Björnsdatter, Danish wife of Audun and mother of Olav
- Queen Ingebjörg of Norway, friend of Cecilia
- Ingolf Olavsson, Olav's grandfather
- Ragna Hallkelsdatter, Ingolf's wife and Olav's grandmother
- Elk, Olav's horse at Frettastein
- Apalhvit, Olav's horse at Hestviken
- Kinfetch, the costly ornamented axe that Olav inherited from his father. Olav Torgilsson, his great-great-grandfather was holding it when he died in battle. At that time it was called 'Wrathful Iron'.
- Olav Ribbung or Olav Olavsson, great-grandfather of Olav
- Olav Torgilsson, father of Olav Ribbung and great-great-grandfather of Olav Audunsson He was the first male of the line to live at * Hestviken.
- Tora Ingolfsdatter, wife of Olav Torgilsson and mother of Olav Ribbung
- Ingolf of Hestviken, father of Tora who died without a male heir
- Torgils Fivil of Dyfrin, father of Olav Torgilsson
- Astrid Helgesdatter of Mork, wife of Olav Ribbung
- Helge Olavsson, son of Astrid and Olav Ribbung. He was the brother of Olav Audunsson's grandfather Ingolf and of Torgils Foulbeard. He fell at Nidaros with King Skule.
- Cecilia Olavsdatter, daughter of Olav Audunsson and Ingunn Steinfinnsdatter
- Ivar Staal, son-in-law of Olav Ribbung
- Halldis, wife of Ivar Staal and daughter of Olav Ribbung and Astrid
- Borgny the Nun, daughter of Olav Ribbung and Astrid
- Ingolf Alavsson, priest and twin brother of Olav Ribbung
- Nikulaus Arnesson, bishop who ordained Ingolf
- Olav Ingolfsson "Half-Priest", son of Ingolf Alavsson
- Bergljot of Tveit, Olav Half-Priest's mother
- Kaare of Tveit, brother of Olav Half-Priest
- Erlend of Aasheim, brother of Olav Half-priest
- Torgils Foulbeard, son of Olav Ribbung and Astrid
- Aasa, Torgils mistress who cares for the child Olav Audunsson
- Herdis Karlsdatter, another mistress of Torgils
- Jon of Stein, Herdis's husband
- Earl Alf Erlingsson of Tornberg, patron of young Olav Audunsson

== Arne's family ==
- Sira Benedikt Bessesson, parish priest at Hestviken
- Astrid, Sira Benedikt's sister and mother of Torgils' illegitimate son Arne
- Arne Torgilsson of Hestbaek, illegitimate son of Astrid and Torgils
- Signe, Una, and Torgunn, daughters of Arne
- Baard Paalsson, husband of Signe Andresdatter
- Paal of Skikkjustad, father of Baard
- Kaare Jonsson of Roaldstad, Astrid's husband and good stepfather to Arne

== The Steinfinnsons ==
- Steinfinn Toresson of Frettastein, foster-father of Olav
- Ingebjörg Jonsdatter, wife of Steinfinn
- Mattias Haraldsson, originally betrothed to Ingebjörg
- Jon Paalsson, father of Ingebjörg
- Ingunn Steinfinnsdatter, oldest daughter of Steinfinn and Ingebjörg and wife of Olav, the Master of Hestviken
- Tora Steinfinnsdatter, younger daughter of Steinfinn and Ingebjörg
- Hallvard Steinfinnsson, oldest son of Steinfinn and Ingebjörg
- Jon Steinfinnsson, younger son of Steinfinn and Ingebjörg
- Tore Steinfinnsson of Hov, grandfather of Steinfinn Toresson
- Tore Toresson of Hov, father of Steinfinn Toresson
- Kolbein Toresson, illegitimate son of Tore Toresson, and Steinfinn's half-brother
- Ivar Toresson, full brother of Steinfinn
- Einar Kolbeinsson, son of Kolbein and cousin of Ingunn
- Haftor Kolbeinsson, brother of Einar
- Hallvard, cousin of Einar and Haftor
- Borghild, sister of Hallvard

== Sir Gaut's family ==
- Sir Gaut Torvardsson, friend of Kolbein and kinsman of Andres Plytt
- Lord Andres Plytt, member of the council that governs Norway while the King is underage
- Helga Gautsdatter, Sir Gaut's daughter
- Haakon Gautsson, son of Sir Gaut. Kolbein promised Ingunn to him but he married her sister Tora
- Steinfinn Haakonsson, son of Haakon and Tora

== Ingunn's family at Berg ==
- Lady Magnhild of Berg, aunt of Ingunn, and the oldest of Tore Toresson's legitimate children
- Dagny and Margret, twin daughters of Lady Magnhild's foster-daughter
- Aasa Magnusdatter, wife of Tore Toresson and mother of Magnhild and Ivar. She is Ingunn's grandmother and Arnvid's aunt. Aasa's mother was also named Ingunn.
- Viking Erlingsson, deceased husband of Magnhild
- Gudmund Jonsson, suitor for Ingunn at Berg

== Arnvid's Family ==
- Arnvid Finnsson, Steinfinn's first cousin and friend of Olav. Tore Toresson of Hov married Arnvid's father's sister Aasa Magnusdatter; Arnvid is a good singer.
- Tordis, Arnvid Finnsson's wife. She was originally promised to Magnus, the oldest of the Finnsson's.
- Magnus, Finn, and Steinar, three sons of Arnvid
- Hillebjörg of Elfardal, Arnvid's mother
- Guttorm, Arnvid's old henchman who "might be called his foster father"
- Sven Birgersson, friend of Arnvid

== Olav's family in Denmark ==
- Erik Eriksson of Hövdinggaard in Denmark, Olav's maternal uncle
- Barnim Eriksson of Hövdinggard, Olav's maternal uncle
- Stig Björnsson, Olav's maternal uncle.
- Margrete, mother of Cecilia Björnsdatter, Erik Eriksson, Barnim, and Stig. She had two husbands: Erik first, and then Björn.
- Helge of Tveit, a descendant of Olav's great-grandfather
- Ingolf Helgesson and Jon Helgesson of Tveit, the two sons of Helge
- Ketillög, young woman who is befriended by Olav Audunsson in Denmark

== Clergy, servants, neighbors, tradespeople ==
- Lord Torfinn, Bishop of Hamar, later canonized (a historical character)
- Asbjörn All-Fat, priest who serves Lord Torfinn
- Brother Helge, cleric at the Bishop's house
- Sira Hallbjörn, parish priest at Hestviken after Sira Benedikt
- Brother Stefan, priest who came to Hestviken as Ingunn lay dying
- Grim, bailiff at Frettastein and later a servant at Berg
- Dalla, sister of Grim and servant at Frettastein and later at Berg
- Jon, blacksmith in the town of Hamar
- Brother Vegard, priest of Hamar who visits Frettastein
- Gudrid, elderly neighbor of Olav Audunsson at Hestviken.
- Björn Egilsson, husband of Gudrid; he becomes Olav's steward and squire.
- Gunnar, Björn's neighbor whom he kills in anger
- Tore of Hvitastein, Björn's former employer
- Torhild Björnsdatter, daughter of Björn and stepdaughter of Gudrid. She becomes a servant at Hestviken and is the mother of Olav Audunsson's son Björn.
- Ketil, foreman at Torhild's farm, later Torhild's husband
- Arnketil, or Anki, Olav's servant at Hestviken
- Stein, Olav's neighbor at Hestviken
- Leif, steward at Hestviken after Björn
- Claus Wiephart, Olav Audunsson's German trading partner and skilled physician
- Richard Platemaster, English armourer who married a Norwegian girl and settled in Oslo
- Torodd and Galfrid Richardson, the two sons of Richard Platemaster

== Eirik's family ==
- Eirik Olavsson, Son of Ingunn Steinfinnsdatter by Teit Hallson, presumed to be son of Olav Audunsson
- Teit Hallsson the Icelander, clerk to the sheriff's officer and father of Ingunn's illegitimate son Eirik
- Sira Hall Sigurdsson, priest and father of Teit
- Hallveig, Eirik's foster-mother
- Torgal, Hallveig's husband

== The Bersessons ==
- Eldrid Bersesdatter, Wife of Eirik Olavsson
- Berse of Eiken, Father of Eldrid
- Kaare Bersesson, Eldrid's younger brother
- Gunhild Bersesdatter, Eldrid's sister

== Veterans and rulers from the war with Denmark ==
- Asger Magnusson, distant kin of Olav Audunsson and his commander in the war
- Duke Haakon, father of Tore Haakonsson and brother of King Eirik of Norway
- King Eirik of Norway
- King Eirik Valdemarsson, grandfather of King Eirik and Duke Haakon
- Constable Stig Andersson, a Danish lord and enemy in the War
- Count Jacob, Danish lord and enemy in the war

== People from conflicts in 12th century Norway ==
- Sverre Prest (Sverre Priest), also known as Sverre of Norway. He was King of Norway and enemy of the men of Hestviken
- King Magnus Erlingsson of Norway, friend of the men of Hestviken.
- The followers of Sverre were called Birchlegs or Birkebeinere. They killed Olav Torgilsson at the Battle of Oslo and burned Hestviken. It had not yet been restored when Olav Audunsson took up residence there.
- The Bagler party opposed Sverre and allied with the church and "old nobility" of Norway
- The Ribbungs (named for their leader Sigurd Ribbung) were loyal to the Church party and opposed Sverre and the Birchlegs
- King Skule of Norway (Skule Bårdsson) fought against the Ribbungs. There were Hestviken men on both sides of the battle. In the end, however, Olav Ribbung and his sons supported King Skule.
