= Vaaren =

1914 novel by Sigrid Undset

- Author: Sigrid Undset
- Language: Norwegian
- Publication date: 1914
- Publication place: Norway

Vaaren is a novel written by Norwegian Nobel laureate Sigrid Undset, published in 1914. The book was a hit with the public, and had four impressions during the first year from its release. The protagonists "Rose Wegener" and "Torkild Christensen" enter a happy marriage, but face problems after the death of their child.
