= Jenny (novel) =

1911 novel by Sigrid Undset

- Author: Sigrid Undset
- Translator: Tiina Nunnally
- Language: Norwegian
- Publication date: 1911
- Publication place: Norway

Jenny is a novel by the Norwegian writer Sigrid Undset, published in 1911, and regarded as Undset's literary breakthrough. The novel is set in Rome and later in Norway. The protagonist "Jenny Winge" tries to make a career as a painter.
