= Gunnar's Daughter =

1909 novel by Sigrid Undset

- Cover of the 1998 Penguin paperback (English edition)
- Author: Sigrid Undset
- Original title: Fortællingen om Viga-Ljot og Vigdis
- Cover artist: Gerhard Munthe
- Language: Norwegian
- Genre: Historical fiction
- Published: 1909
- Publication place: Norway

Gunnar's Daughter is a 1909 short novel written by Nobel laureate Sigrid Undset (1882-1949). This was Undset's first historical novel, set at the beginning of the 11th century in Norway and Iceland.

The novel follows the tragic romance between the proud Vigdis Gunnarsdatter and the Icelandic Viga-Ljot. The major themes are rape, revenge, social codes, marriage, and children bearing the consequences of their parents' actions. The story is written using the motifs and laconic prose of the Icelandic sagas.

== Characters ==
- Vigdis Gunnarsdatter, the protagonist, raped by Ljot
- Ljot Gissursson, the antagonist, suitor of Vigdis
- Ulvar Vigdisson, son of Vigdis and Ljot
- Leikny Lytingsdatter, Ljot's wife in Iceland
- Kaare of Grefsin, friend and suitor of Vigdis
- Veterlide Glumsson, uncle and companion of Ljot
- Gunnar of Vadin, father of Vigdis
- Aesa Haraldsdatter, past mistress of Gunnar and friend of Vigdis
- Eyolv Arneson, killer of Gunnar, avenged by Vigdis
- Koll Arneson, Eyolv's brother
- Illuge, suitor of Vigdis

== Availability ==
Gunnar's Daughter is available in paperback. (New York: Penguin Classics, 1998, ISBN 9780141180205).
