= Happy Times in Norway =

Memoir by Sigrid Undset

- Cover of 2013 English edition
- Author: Sigrid Undset
- Original title: Lykkelige dager
- Translator: Joran Birkeland
- Publication place: Norway
- English publication date: 1942

Happy Times in Norway (Norwegian: Lykkelige dager) is a memoir by Norwegian Nobel Prize winning writer Sigrid Undset. In it, she describes her children's life in Norway before the Nazi occupation. The work was first translated by Joran Birkeland into English in 1942, but not published in its original Norwegian until 1947.
