= Anders Castus Svarstad =

Norwegian painter (1869–1943)

- Born: 22 May 1869; Hole, Norway
- Died: 22 August 1943 (aged 74)
- Education: Norwegian National Academy of Craft and Art Industry
- Occupation: Painter
- Spouses: Ragna Moe Svarstad (m. 1901–1910) Sigrid Undset (m. 1912–1927)

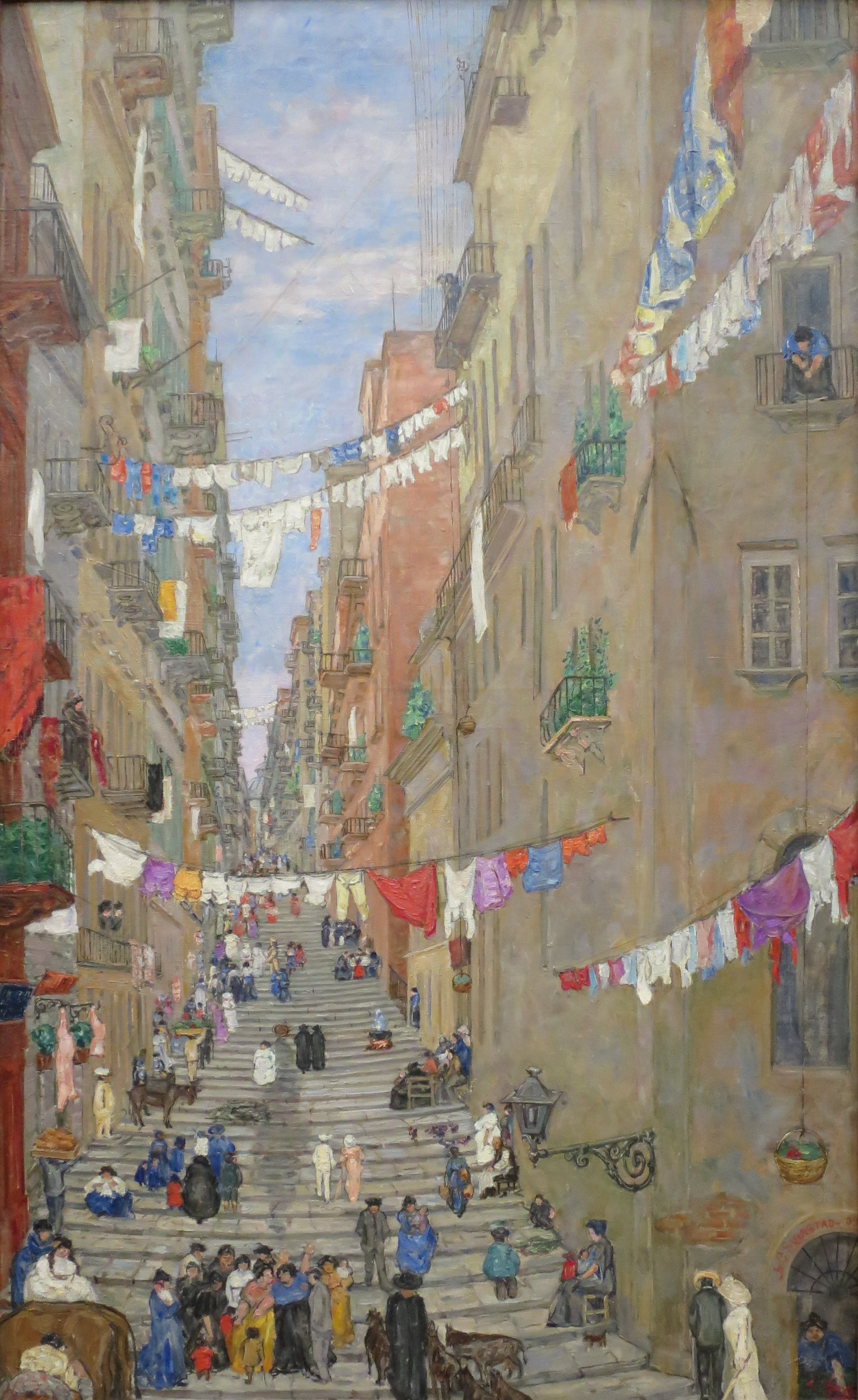
Palonetto Santa Lucia, Naples (1909)

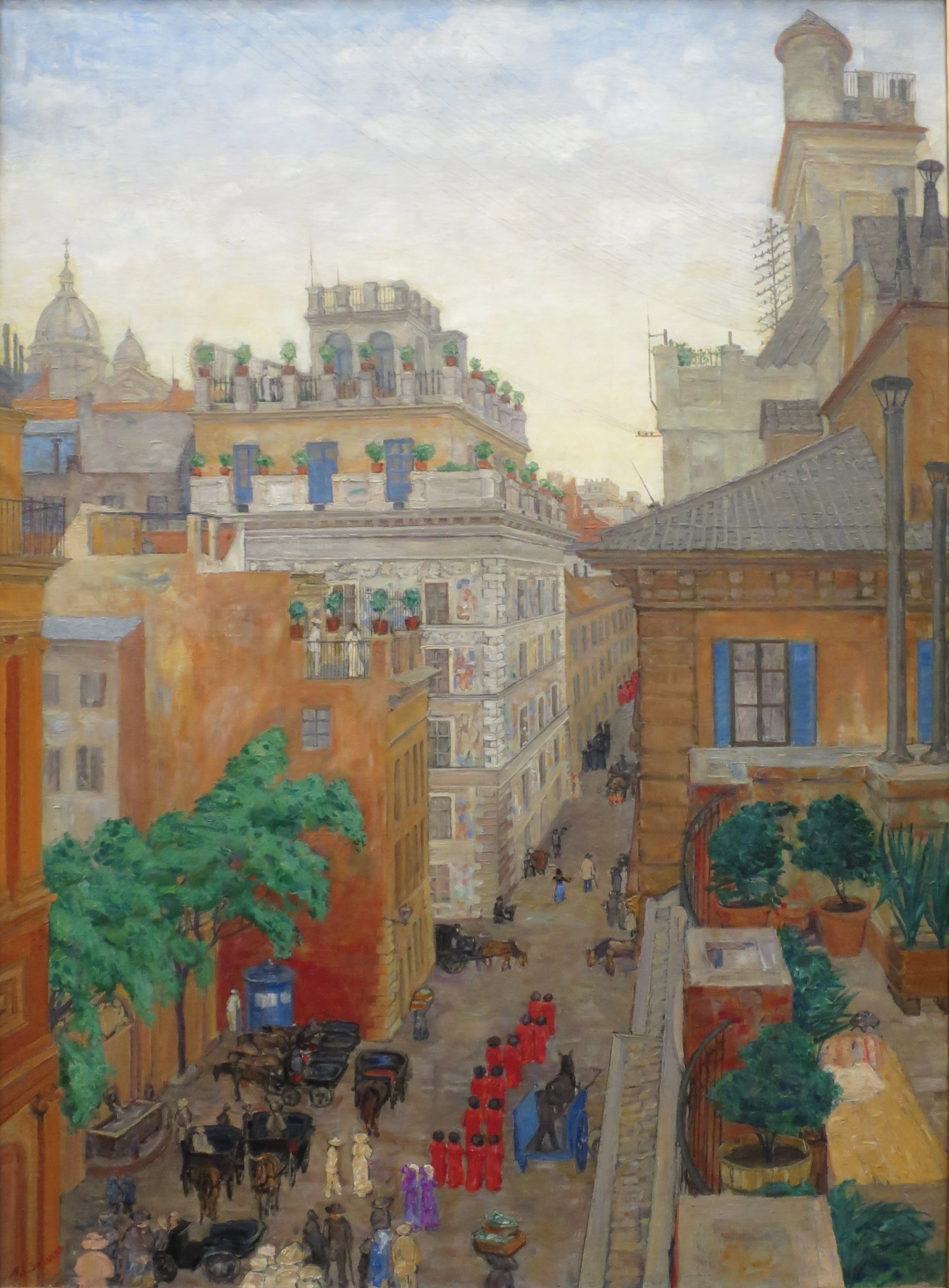
Via Bocca di Leone, Rome (1908)

Anders Castus Svarstad (22 May 1869 – 22 August 1943) was a Norwegian painter, most frequently associated with his urban landscapes.

== Career ==
Anders Castus Svarstad was born at Lille Svarstad in Hole, in Ringerike. He was a pupil at the Norwegian National Academy of Craft and Art Industry in Kristiania (now Oslo) from 1886 to 1889 and worked for a time as decorative paints, including time spent in Chicago at the World's Columbian Exposition (1892–94). He studied in Paris and the following year with Laurits Tuxen in Copenhagen (1897-1898). At the end of the 1890s, he was a student at the Académie Colarossi in Paris.

He made the debut of his paintings at the Autumn Exhibition in Kristiania in 1902. After the debut, he competed regularly at art exhibitions, but supported himself and his family still also through decorative painting. Until approximately 1907, he balanced his career between being an artist and a decorative painter. Svarstad undertook numerous journeys abroad, during which urban scenes captivated his attention. His art began incorporating elements of the modern era, such as telephone wires, gas tanks, and factory chimneys, reflecting his fascination with these developments.

Together with fellow artist Søren Onsager he ran an art school from 1926 to 1929. He was also an art critic and sat on the Council of the National Gallery of Norway and Artist House and as director of Oslo Art Society. He is represented in the National Gallery of Norway and the Bergen Kunstmuseum with portraits, city scapes and still lifes.

== Personal life ==
He was married twice. In 1904, he married Ragna Moe (1882-1963). The marriage was dissolved in 1912. He was married to Nobel Prize winning Norwegian novelist Sigrid Undset from 1912 until the marriage was dissolved in 1927.

== Gallery ==
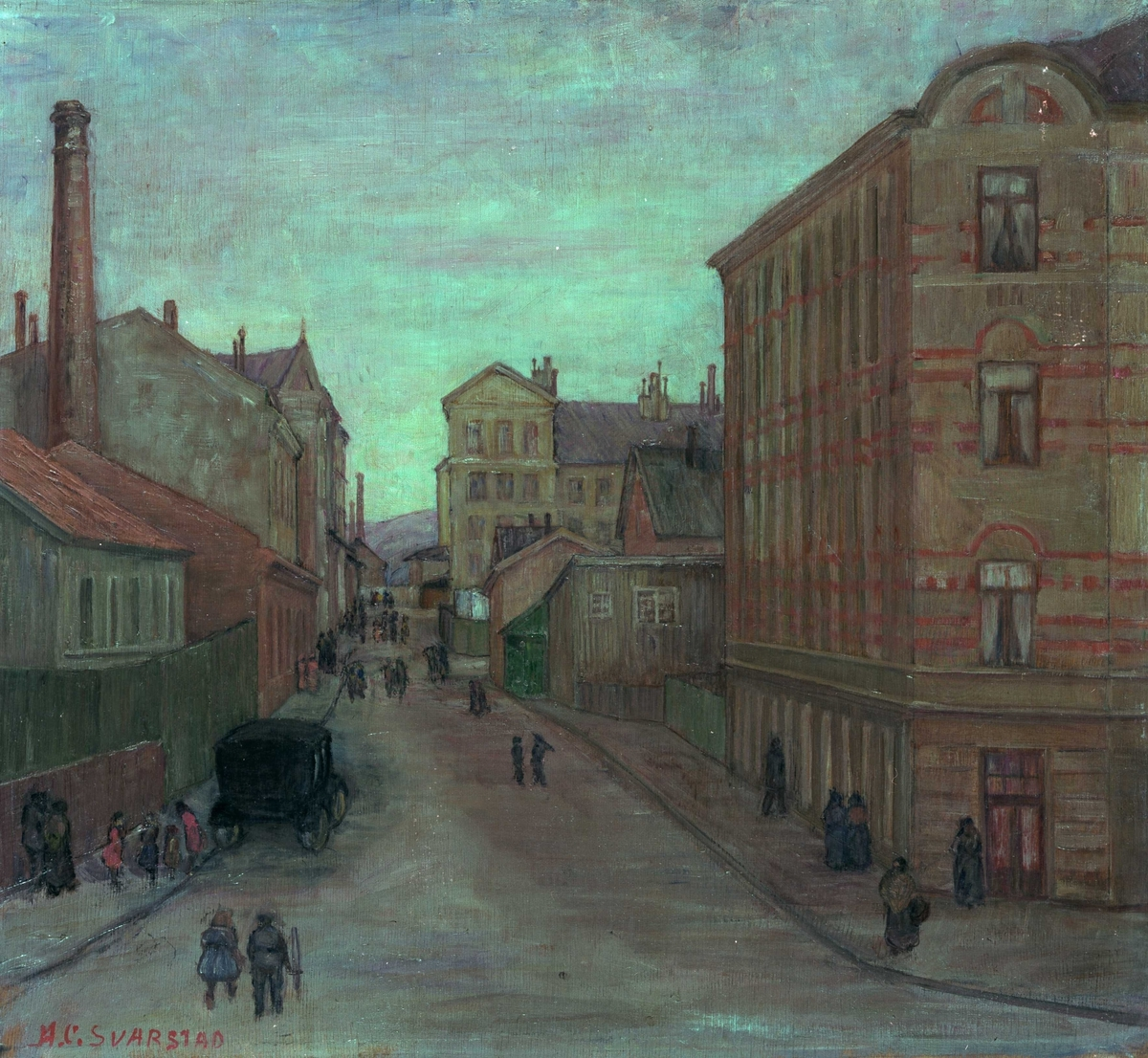
Street View in Oslo (1922)

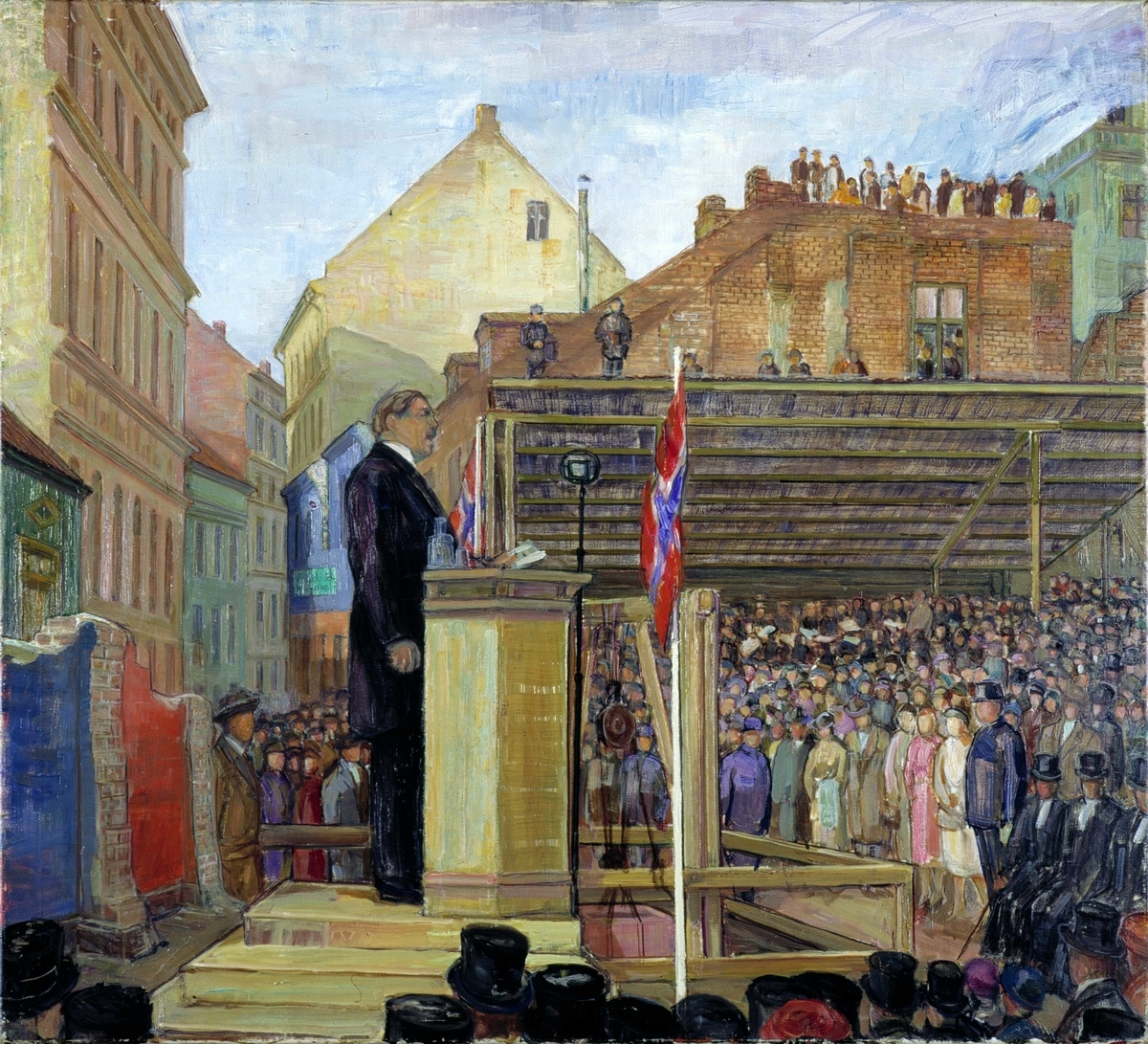
Foundation Ceremony at the City Hall (1931)

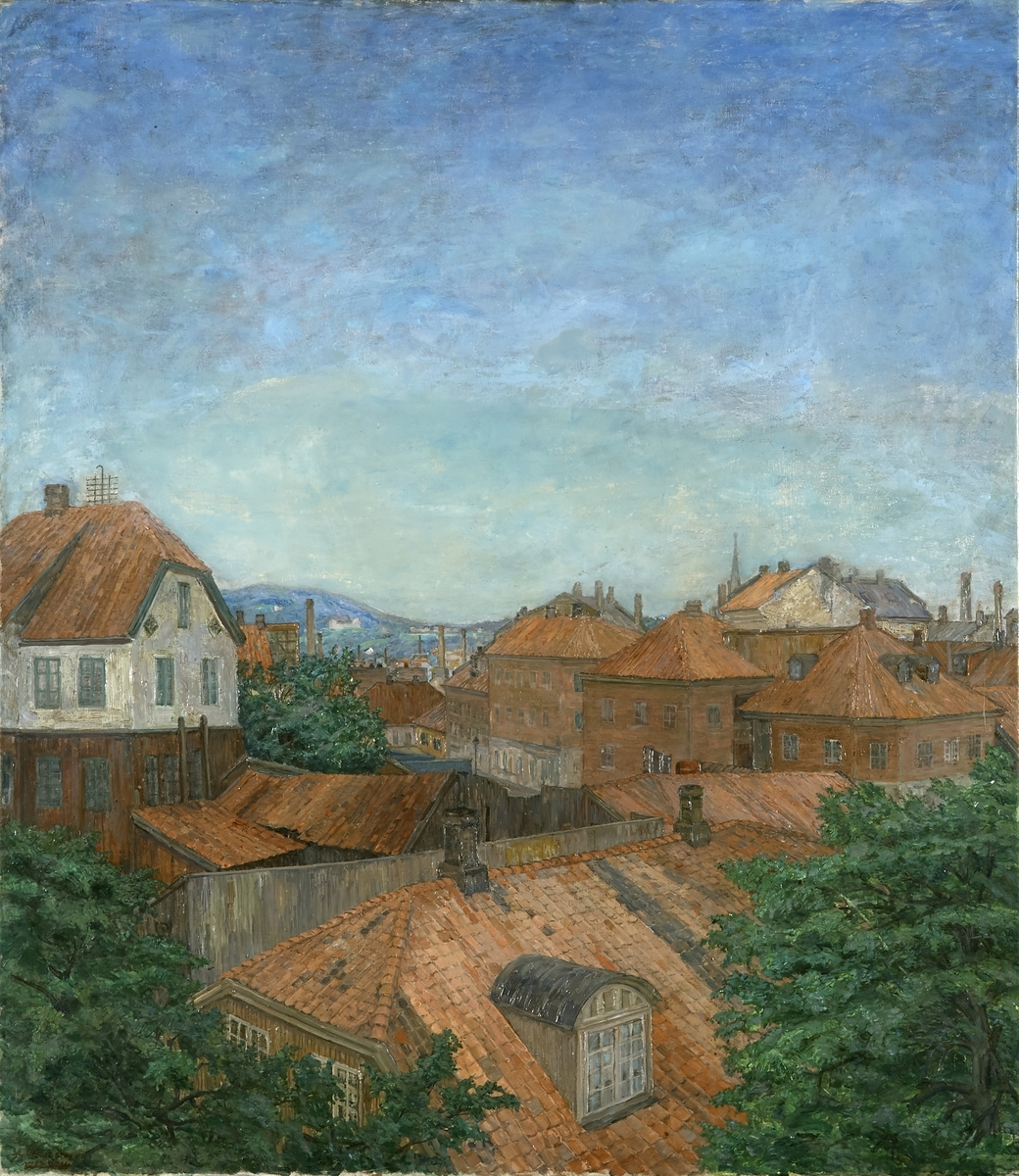
Hammersborg (1912)

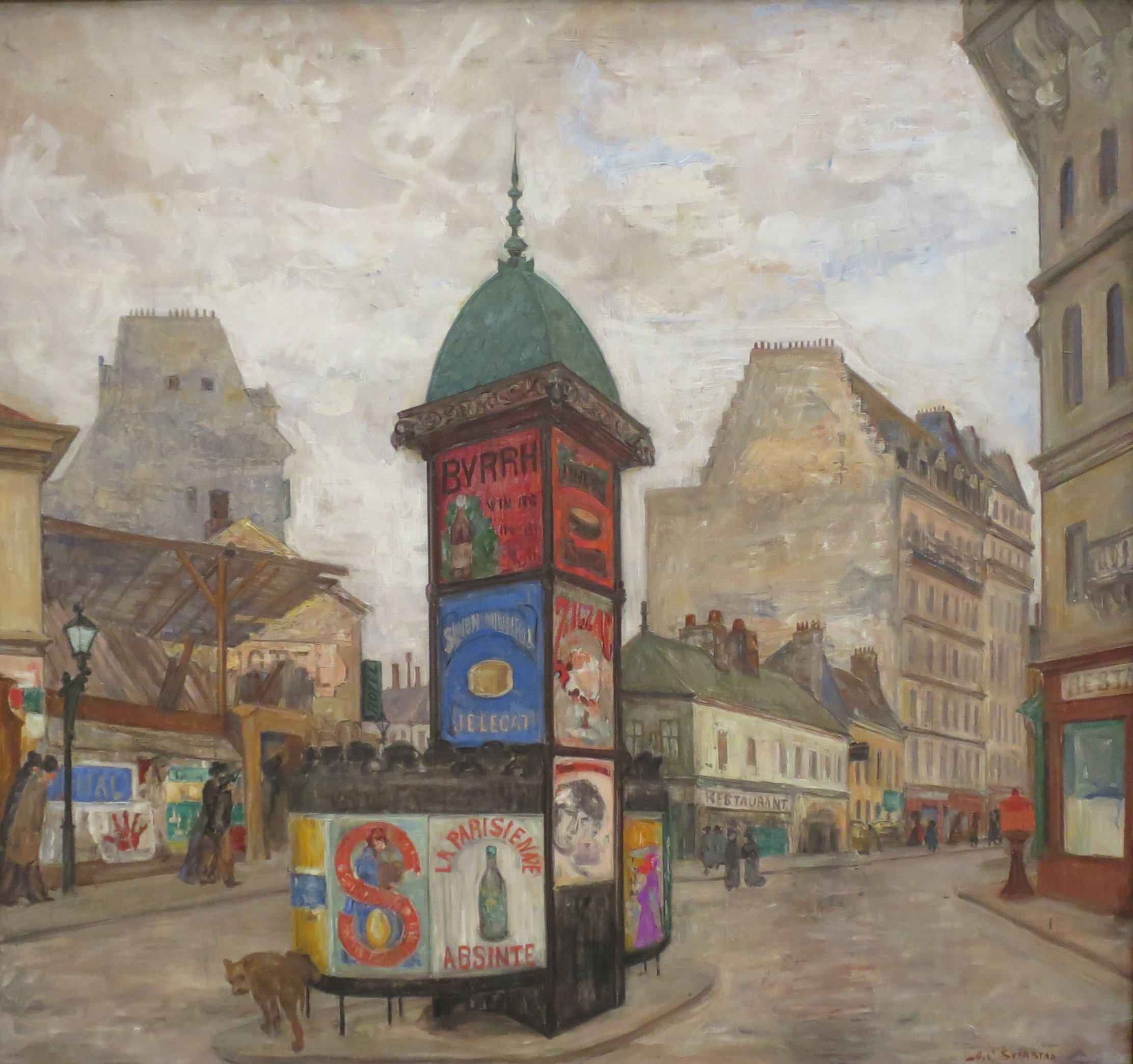
Street in Bruges (1910)

== Selected works ==
- Fra Akerselven, 1908–12, Drammens Museum
- Palonetto Santa Lucia, 1909, Bergen Art Museum
- Parti fra La Morgue, 1910, National Gallery of Norway
- Sigrid Undset, 1911, Bergen Art Museum
- Fabrikker ved Themsen, 1912, Bergen Art Museum
- Sigrid Undset, 1912, Den norske forfatterforening, Oslo
- Terrasse i Roma, 1913, National Gallery of Norway
- Via Bocca di Leone, 1908, Bergen Kunstmuseum
