= The Master of Hestviken =

1925–1927 tetralogy by Sigrid Undset

- Knopf edition
- Author: Sigrid Undset
- Original title: Olav Audunssøn i Hestviken, Olav Audunssøn og Hans Børn
- Translator: Arthur G. Chater, Tiina Nunnally
- Language: Norwegian
- Genre: Historical fiction
- Publication date: 1925-1927
- Publication place: Norway
- English publication date: 1928-1930
- Media type: Print

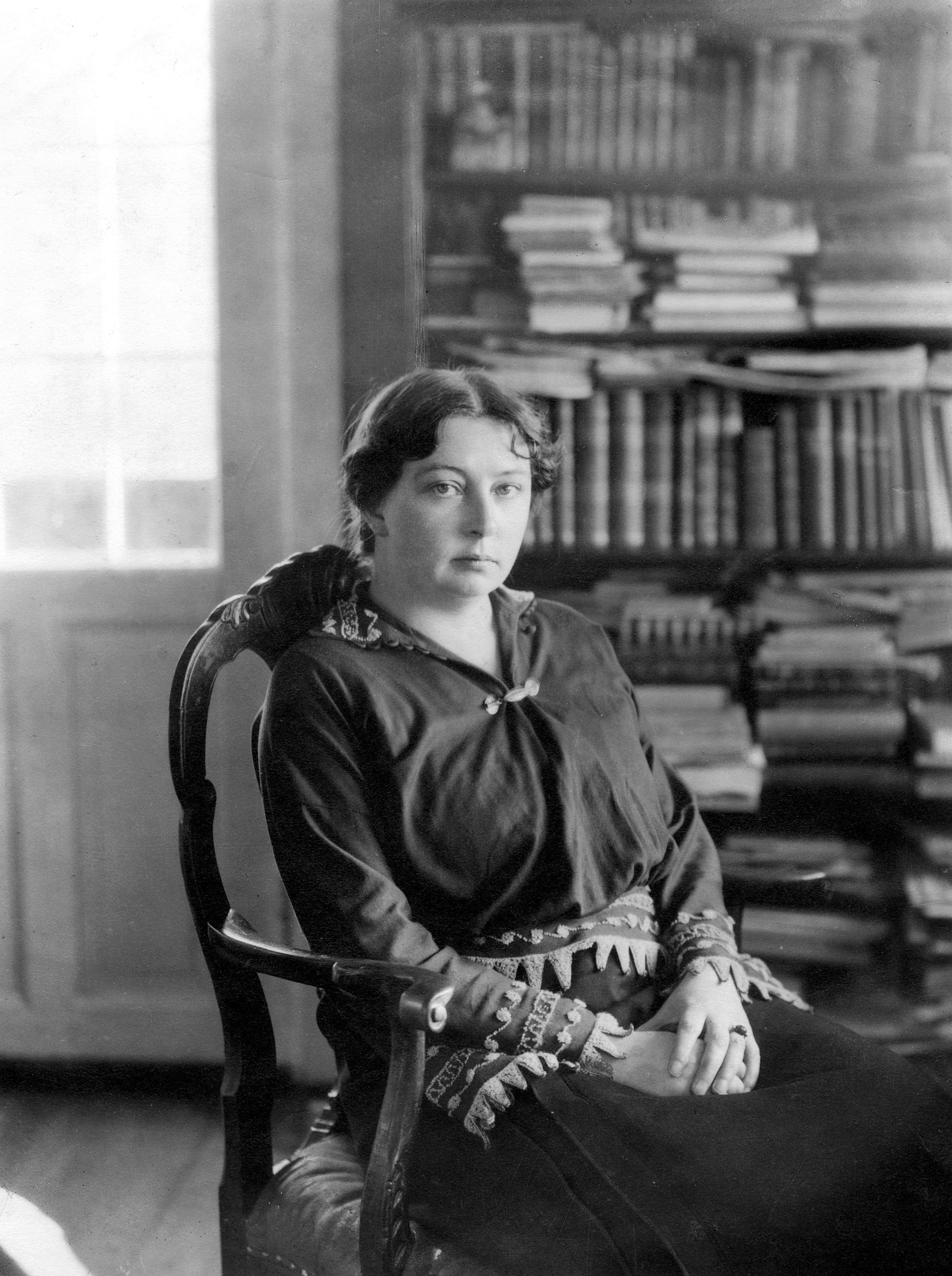
Sigrid Undset

The Master of Hestviken is a tetralogy about medieval Norway written by Sigrid Undset. It was originally published in Norwegian as two volumes Olav Audunssøn i Hestviken and Olav Audunssøn og Hans Børn, from 1925 to 1927. Hestviken is a fictional mediaeval farm on the East side of the Oslo fjord. The series is set partly during the Civil war era in Norway, in which period the Bagler faction frequently established themselves in the nearby Viken area. It's inspired by the summer cottages located in Hvitsten, near Drobak. In the 1920s, Sigrid Undset resided there for a brief period.

Written in the direct aftermath of Undset's conversion to the Catholic Church, the tetralogy presents in a clearly favorable light the Medieval Church with its institutions and rituals; the saintly Bishop Thorfinn of Hamar as well as nearly all priests and monks appearing in the four books are positive characters. The series' central theme is also preeminently Catholic: the tragedy of Olav, a deeply pious and upright man, who feels himself damned and cut off from God because of his unconfessed sin - having secretly killed his wife's lover. Yet he cannot bring himself to confess that deed, as doing so would expose his beloved wife's infidelity and destroy her good name, as well as exposing the illegitimacy of her son. Commentator Margaret Wide noted that "A modern reader is likely to feel that Olav judges himself far more harshly than he deserves - and it can be surmised that so would have a reader of Olav's own time. And surely a God as merciful as Christianity conceives Him to be would forgive Olav for a sin committed for the most understandable and honorable of motives, and expiated many times over".

== Series and English translations ==
The Master of Hestviken (titled Olav Audunssøn in T. Nunnally's 2020-2023 translations from University of Minnesota Press) series is of four volumes, which are listed in order below.

Arthur G. Chater translation. Depending on the publication, each volume may be published separately or with one other volume. The latter tend to be the earlier printings:

1. The Axe: The Master of Hestviken, ISBN 0-679-75273-0
2. The Snake Pit: The Master of Hestviken, ISBN 0-679-75554-3
3. In the Wilderness: The Master of Hestviken, ISBN 0-679-75553-5
4. The Son Avenger: The Master of Hestviken, ISBN 0-679-75552-7

Tiina Nunnally's translation:

1. Olav Audunssøn (I): Vows, ISBN 978-1517910488
2. Olav Audunssøn (II): Providence, ISBN 978-1517911607
3. Olav Audunssøn (III): Crossroads, ISBN 978-1517913342
4. Olav Audunssøn (IV): Winter, ISBN 978-1517915414

== Relationship to Kristin Lavransdatter ==
Sigrid Undset's arguably most famous novel is Kristin Lavransdatter. Kristin's parents make a brief appearance in The Master of Hestviken, near the end of The Snake Pit/Providence. They are shown as young married people, playing with their baby son. They are a happy and prosperous couple at their first home in Skog, before Kristin's birth. Kristin's father Lavrans Björgulfson helps Olav Audunsson journey home when Ingunn is on her deathbed. Olav's unfortunate life stands in stark contrast to the happiness and good fortune of the young couple.
