= Sigrid Undset =

Norwegian novelist (1882–1949) and Nobel laureate

Servant of God Sigrid Undset TOSD
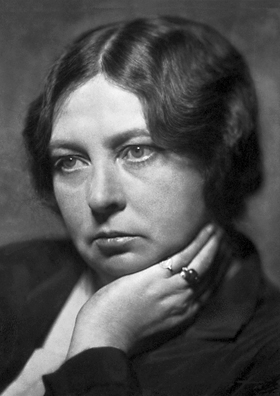
- Born: 20 May 1882; Kalundborg, Denmark
- Died: 10 June 1949 (aged 67); Lillehammer, Norway
- Occupation: Writer
- Spouse: Anders Castus Svarstad (m. 1912; dissolved 1927)
- Children: 3
- Relatives: Ingvald Martin Undset (father); Anna Marie Charlotte Nicoline née Gyth (mother)
- Writing career
- Notable awards: Nobel Prize in Literature; 1928

Sigrid Undset (Norwegian: [ˈsɪ̂ɡːɾiː ˈʉ̂nːseːt]; 20 May 1882 – 10 June 1949) was a Danish-born Norwegian novelist. She was awarded the 1928 Nobel Prize in Literature.

Born in Denmark and raised in Norway, Undset had her first books of historical fiction published in 1907. She fled Norway for the United States in 1940 because of her opposition to Nazi Germany and the German invasion and occupation of Norway, but returned after the end of World War II in Europe in 1945.

Her best-known work is Kristin Lavransdatter, a trilogy about life in Norway in the Middle Ages, portrayed through the experiences of a woman from birth until death. Its three volumes were published between 1920 and 1922.

== Early life ==
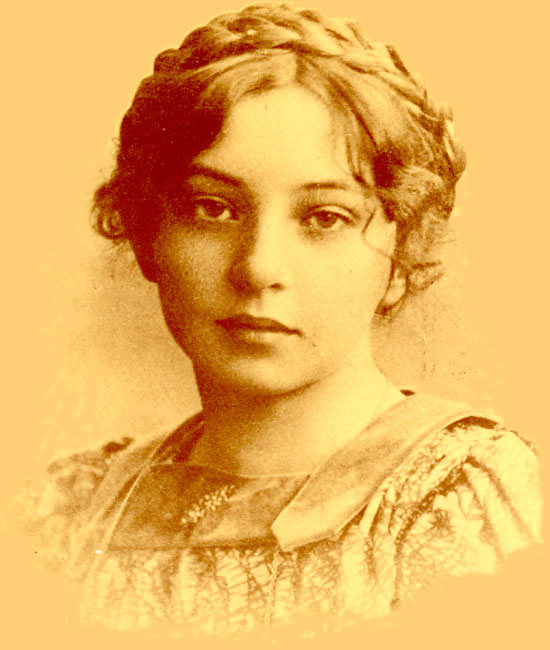
Undset as a young girl

Sigrid Undset was born on 20 May 1882 in the small town of Kalundborg, Denmark, at the childhood home of her mother, Charlotte Undset (1855–1939, née Anna Maria Charlotte Gyth). Her father was the Norwegian archaeologist Ingvald Martin Undset (1853–1893). Sigrid Undset was the eldest of three daughters. She and her family moved to Norway when she was two.

She grew up in the Norwegian capital, Oslo (or Kristiania, as it was known until 1925), where the family moved in July 1884. When she was only 11 years old, her father died at the age of 40 after a long illness.

The family's economic situation meant that Undset had to give up hope of a university education and after a one-year secretarial course she obtained work at the age of 16 as a secretary with an engineering company in Kristiania, a post she went on to hold for 10 years. She later said that she detested the work.

She joined the Norwegian Authors' Union in 1907 and from 1933 through 1935 headed its Literary Council, eventually serving as the union's chairwoman from 1935 until 1940.

== Writer ==
While employed at office work, Undset wrote and studied. She was 16 years old when she made her first attempt at writing a novel set in the Nordic Middle Ages. The manuscript, a historical novel set in medieval Denmark, was ready by the time she was 22. It was turned down by the publishing house.

Nonetheless, two years later, she completed another manuscript, much less voluminous than the first at only 80 pages. She had put aside the Middle Ages and had instead produced a realistic description of a woman with a middle-class background in contemporary Kristiania. This book was also refused by the publishers at first but it was subsequently accepted.

At the age of 25, Undset made her literary debut with a short realist novel on adultery, set against a contemporary background. It created a stir, and she found herself ranked as a promising young author in Norway. During the years up to 1919, Undset published a number of novels set in contemporary Kristiania, concerning the city, its inhabitants, and relationships.

This realistic period culminated in the novels Jenny (1911) and Vaaren (Spring) (1914). The first is about a woman painter who, as a result of romantic crises, believes that she is wasting her life, and, in the end, commits suicide. The other tells of a woman who succeeds in saving both herself and her love from a serious matrimonial crisis, finally creating a secure family. These books placed Undset apart from the incipient women's emancipation movement in Europe.

Undset's books sold well from the start, and, after the publication of her third book, she left her office job and prepared to live on her income as a writer. Having been granted a writer's scholarship, she set out on a lengthy journey in Europe. After short stops in Denmark and Germany, she continued to Italy, arriving in Rome in December 1909, where she remained for nine months. Undset's parents had had a close relationship with Rome, and, during her stay there, she followed in their footsteps. The encounter with Southern Europe meant a great deal to her; she made friends within the circle of Scandinavian artists and writers in Rome.

== Marriage and children ==
In Rome, Undset met Anders Castus Svarstad, a Norwegian painter, whom she married almost three years later. She was 30; Svarstad was thirteen years older, married, and had a wife and three children in Norway. It was nearly three years before Svarstad divorced from his first wife.

Undset and Svarstad were married in 1912 and went to stay in London for six months. From London, they returned to Rome, where their first child was born in January 1913. A boy, he was named after his father. In the years up to 1919, she had another child, and the household also took in Svarstad's three children from his first marriage. These were difficult years: her second child, a girl, was mentally handicapped, as was one of Svarstad's sons by his first wife.

She continued writing, finishing her last realistic novels and collections of short stories. She also entered the public debate on topical themes: women's emancipation and other ethical and moral issues. She had considerable polemical gifts, and was critical of emancipation as it was developing, and of the moral and ethical decline she felt was threatening in the wake of the First World War.

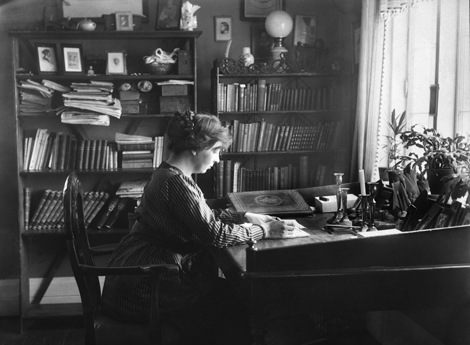
Undset at work at Bjerkebæk

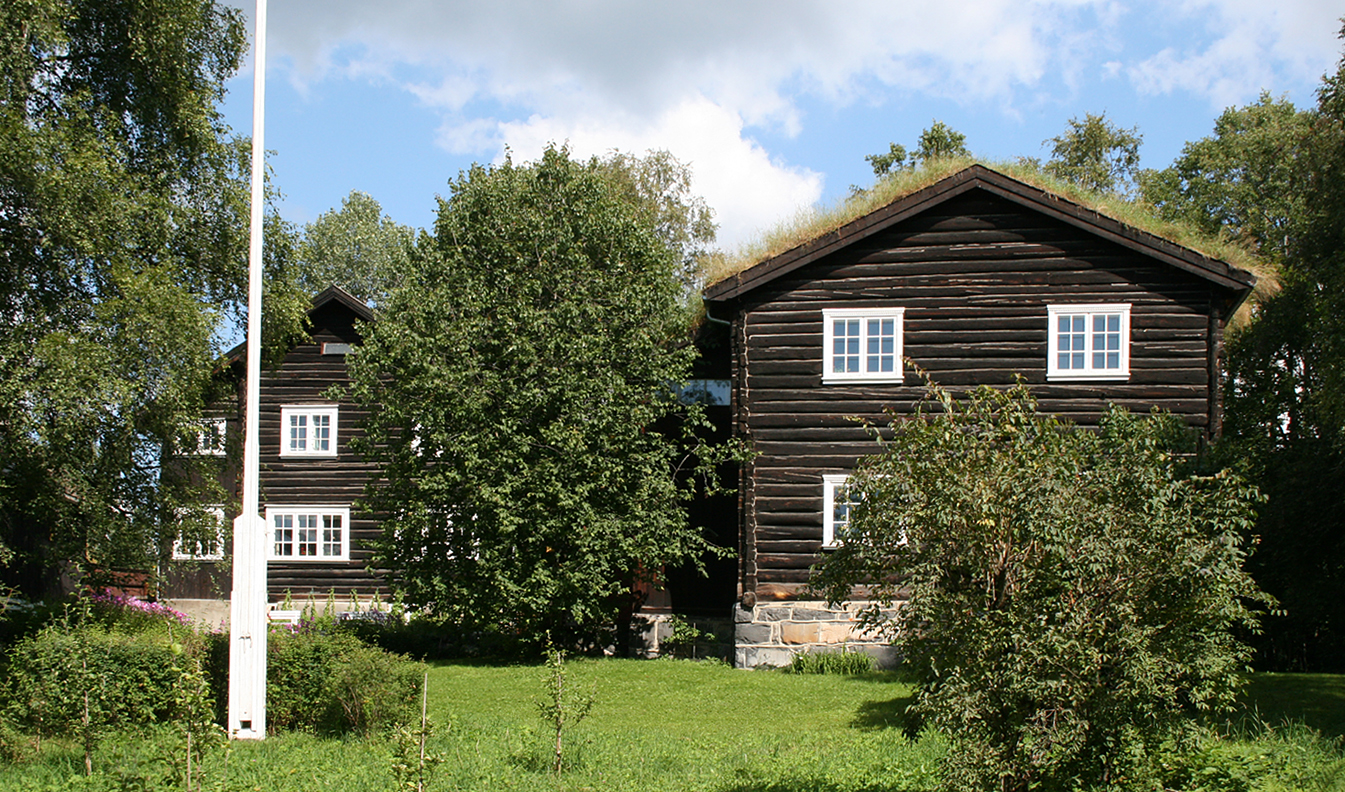
Bjerkebæk, Undset's home, now part of Maihaugen museum

In 1919, she moved to Lillehammer, a small town in the Gudbrand Valley in southeast Norway, taking her two children with her, while her husband stayed in Italy. She was then expecting her third child. The intention was that she should take a rest at Lillehammer and move back to Kristiania as soon as Svarstad had their new house in order. However, the marriage broke down and a divorce followed. In August 1919, she gave birth to her third child, at Lillehammer. She decided to make Lillehammer her home, and within two years, Bjerkebæk, a large house of traditional Norwegian timber architecture, was completed, along with a large fenced garden with views of the town and the villages around. Here she was able to retreat and concentrate on her writing.

== Kristin Lavransdatter trilogy and The Master of Hestviken tetralogy ==
After the birth of her third child, and with a secure roof over her head, Undset started a major project: Kristin Lavransdatter. She was at home in the subject matter, having written a short novel at an earlier stage about a period in Norwegian history closer to the Pre-Christian era. She had also published a Norwegian retelling of the Arthurian legends. She had studied Old Norse manuscripts and medieval chronicles and visited and examined medieval churches and monasteries, both at home and abroad. She was now an authority on the period she was portraying and a very different person from the 22-year-old who had written her first novel about the Middle Ages.

It was only after the end of her marriage that Undset wrote her masterpiece. In the years between 1920 and 1927, she first published the three-volume Kristin, and then the 4-volume Olav (Audunssøn), translated into English as The Master of Hestviken.

Undset experimented with modernist literary techniques such as stream of consciousness in her novel, although the original English translation by Charles Archer excised many of these passages. In 1997, the first volume of Tiina Nunnally's new translation of the work won the PEN/Faulkner Award for Fiction in the category of translation. The names of each volume were translated by Archer as The Bridal Wreath, The Mistress of Husaby, and The Cross, and by Nunnally as The Wreath, The Wife, and The Cross. Subsequent translation of the Hestviken tetralogy by Nunnally are retitled Olav Audunssøn (1):Vows (The Axe), …(2) Providence, (The Snake Pit), …(3) Crossroads (In The Wilderness), and …(4) Winter (The Son Avenger).

== Catholicism ==
Both Undset's parents were atheists and, although, in accord with the norm of the day, she and her two younger sisters were baptised and with their mother regularly attended the local Lutheran church, the milieu in which they were raised was a thoroughly secular one. Undset spent much of her life as an agnostic, but marriage and the outbreak of the First World War were to change her attitudes. During those difficult years she experienced a crisis of faith, almost imperceptible at first, then increasingly strong. The crisis led her from clear agnostic skepticism, by way of painful uneasiness about the ethical decline of the age, towards Christianity.

Beginning around 1917, Undset developed a passionate interest in the writings of Monsignor Robert Hugh Benson, many of whose writings she would later translate into Norwegian. However, she did not turn to the established Lutheran Church of Norway, where she had been nominally reared. This is because, according to Geir Hasnes, Undset had always considered the Lutheran Church "anemic" and "detested the fact that every minister seemed to preach his personal version of Lutheranism."

She was received into the Catholic Church in November 1924, after thorough instruction from the Catholic priest in her local parish. She was 42 years old. She subsequently became a lay Dominican.

In Norway, Undset's conversion to Catholicism was not only considered sensational; it was scandalous. It was also noted abroad, where her name was becoming known through the international success of Kristin Lavransdatter. At the time, there were very few practicing Catholics in Norway, which was an almost exclusively Lutheran country. Anti-Catholicism was widespread not only among the Lutheran clergy, but through large sections of the population.

For many years, she participated in the public debate, introducing the Catholic literary revival into Norwegian literature. In response, she was dubbed "The Mistress of Bjerkebæk" and "The Catholic Lady".

Undset's essays about Elizabethan era English Catholic martyrs Margaret Clitherow and Robert Southwell were collected and published in Stages on the Road. Furthermore, Undset's Saga of Saints told the whole of Norwegian history through the lives of Norwegian saints.

In May 1928, Undset travelled to England and visited G. K. Chesterton and Hilaire Belloc, both of whose writings she would soon translate into Norwegian. Undset's translation of The Everlasting Man was published in 1931.

In 2026, during his sermon at Seljumannamesse, bishop Fredrik Hansen of the Catholic Diocese of Oslo announced the initiation of the canonization process for Sigrid Undset.

== Later life ==
After 1929, Undset completed a series of novels set in contemporary Oslo. She also published a number of weighty historical works which put the history of Norway into a sober perspective. In addition, she translated several Icelandic sagas into Norwegian and published a number of literary essays, mainly on English literature, of which a long essay on the Brontë sisters, and one on D. H. Lawrence.

In 1934, she published Eleven Years Old, an autobiographical work.

At the end of the 1930s, she commenced work on a new historical novel set in 18th century Scandinavia. Only the first volume, Madame Dorthea, was published, in 1939. The Second World War broke out that same year and proceeded to break her, both as a writer and as a woman. She never completed her new novel. When Joseph Stalin's invasion of Finland touched off the Winter War, Undset supported the Finnish war effort by donating her Nobel Prize on 25 January 1940.

== Exile ==
When Germany invaded Norway in April 1940, Undset was forced to flee. She had strongly criticised both Nazi ideology and Adolf Hitler since the early 1930s, and, from an early date, her books were banned as part of censorship in Nazi Germany. She accordingly knew her name was on a list of those to be rounded up in the first wave of arrests and had no wish to become a target of the Gestapo. She accordingly fled to neutral Sweden.

Her eldest son, Norwegian Army Second Lieutenant Anders Svarstad, was killed in action at the age of 27, on 27 April 1940, while defending Segalstad Bridge in Gausdal from German troops.

Undset's sick daughter had died shortly before the outbreak of the war. Bjerkebæk was requisitioned by the Wehrmacht, and used as officers' quarters throughout the Occupation of Norway. Undset's library had already been secretly divided between her closest local friends. The books were hidden at great risk throughout the Nazi occupation and were returned to her after the Liberation of Norway.

In 1940, Undset and her younger son left neutral Sweden then crossed the Soviet Union via the Trans-Siberian Railroad before arriving as a political refugee in the United States. There, she untiringly pleaded occupied Norway's cause and the plight of European Jews in writings, speeches and interviews. She lived in Brooklyn Heights, New York. She was active in St. Ansgar's Scandinavian Catholic League and wrote several articles for its bulletin. She also traveled to Florida, where she became a close friend of novelist Marjorie Kinnan Rawlings.

Following the Gestapo's arrest and summary execution of Danish Lutheran pastor and playwright Kaj Munk on 4 January 1944, the Danish resistance newspaper De frie Danske printed protests from many famous Scandinavian intellectuals, including Undset.

== Return to Norway and death ==
Undset returned to Norway after the liberation in 1945. She lived another four years but no longer published. Neither she nor her son Hans thrived after returning to Bjerkebæk. In May 1948 she had a psychological breakdown, while on visit to her birth town Kalundborg. In June 1949 she was admitted to Lillehammer hospital with kidney inflammation. Undset died shortly after at 67 in Lillehammer, Norway, where she had lived from 1919 through 1940. She was buried in the village of Mesnali, 15 kilometers east of Lillehammer, where her daughter and son are also buried. The grave is recognizable by three black crosses.

== Honors ==
- Undset won the Nobel prize for literature in 1928, for which she was nominated by Helga Eng, member of the Norwegian Academy of Science and Letters.
- A mountain on the moon, east of crater Lambert at Mare Imbrium, was called Mons Undset, however, it was erroneously mentioned as Mons Undest on Lunar Topographic Orthophotomap 40B4. The International Astronomical Union (IAU) refused to include Mons Undset in the alphabetic gazetteer of officially named lunar formations. This mountain is nowadays known as Lambert γ (Lambert gamma).
- A crater on the planet Venus was named after Undset.
- Minor planet 9919 Undset is named after her.
  - MPC
  - JPL
- Undset was depicted on a Norwegian 500 kroner note and a two-kroner postage stamp from 1982. Neighboring Sweden put her on a stamp in 1998.
- Bjerkebæk, Undset's home in Lillehammer, is now part of the Maihaugen museum. The farmhouse was listed in 1983. Efforts to restore and furnish the houses as they were during the time of her occupancy were begun in 1997. The museum was restored and more buildings were opened to the public in May 2007.
- Undset is depicted on the tail fin of a Norwegian Air Shuttle Boeing 737-800, with the registration LN-NGY.

== Works ==
=== Novels ===
- Marta Oulie (1907)
- The Happy Age (1908)
- Gunnar's Daughter is a brief novel set in the Saga Age. This was Undset's first historical novel, published in 1909.
  - Gunnar's Daughter, ISBN 0-14-118020-X
- Jenny was written in 1911. It is a story of a Norwegian painter who travels to Rome for inspiration. Things do not turn out as she had expected.
  - Jenny, ISBN 1-58642-050-X
- The Unknown Sigrid Undset, a collection of Undset's early existentialist works, including Tiina Nunnally's new translation of Jenny was assembled by Tim Page for Steerforth Press and published in 2001.
- Kristin Lavransdatter is a trilogy of three volumes. These are listed in order as well. Written during 1920–22. In 1995 the first volume was the basis for a commercial film, Kristin Lavransdatter, directed by Liv Ullmann.
  - Kristin Lavransdatter: The Wreath. ISBN 0-14-118041-2
  - Kristin Lavransdatter: The Wife, ISBN 0-14-118128-1
  - Kristin Lavransdatter: The Cross, ISBN 0-14-118235-0
- The Master of Hestviken series is a tetralogy of four volumes, published 1925–27, which are listed in order below. Depending on the edition, each volume may be printed by itself, or two volumes may be combined into one book. The latter tends to result from older printings and whether the original Norwegian or later English translation. Recent completed re-titling/releases by Tiina Nunnally, from the University of Minnesota Press, are shown below.
  - The Axe: The Master of Hestviken, ISBN 0-679-75273-0, re-titled in T. Nunnally's revised English translation as Olav Audunssøn (I): Vows, ISBN 978-1517910488
  - The Snake Pit: The Master of Hestviken, ISBN 0-679-75554-3, re-titled in T. Nunnally's revised English translation as Olav Audunssøn (II): Providence, ISBN 978-1517911607
  - In the Wilderness: The Master of Hestviken, ISBN 0-679-75553-5, re-titled in T. Nunnally's revised English translation as Olav Audunssøn (III): Crossroads, ISBN 978-1517913342
  - The Son Avenger: The Master of Hestviken, ISBN 0-679-75552-7, re-titled in T. Nunnally's revised English translation as Olav Audunssøn (IV): Winter, ISBN 978-1517915414
- Ida Elisabeth (1932)
  - Ida Elisabeth (San Francisco: Ignatius Press, 2011), ISBN 1-58617-424-X
- The Wild Orchid is a novel set in twentieth century Norway and published in 1931. The title is in reference to the garden of the main character's mother.
- The Burning Bush is a continuation of the novel The Wild Orchid and published in 1932. It examines the conflicts arising in the main character's life after his conversion to Catholicism.
- Ida Elizabeth 1933. Cassell and Co.
- The Longest Years, 1935
- The Faithful Wife, 1937
- Images in a Mirror, 1938
- Madame Dorthea, 1939 (First volume of uncompleted novel)

=== Other works ===
- Men, Women and Places, a collection of critical essays, including 'Blasphemy', 'D. H. Lawrence', 'The Strongest Power', and 'Glastonbury'. Tr. Arthur G Chater, Cassel & Co., London. 1939.
- Happy Times in Norway, a memoir of her children's life in that country before the Nazi occupation, features a particularly moving and powerful preface about the simplicity and hardiness of Norway and its people, with a vow that it will return thus after the evil of Nazism is "swept clean." New York; Alfred A. Knopf. 1942. ISBN 978-0-313-21267-3
- True and Untrue and Other Norse Tales 1945, by Alfred A Knopf. Reissued 2012 by Pook Press; ISBN 978-1447449607 (hardcover) (based on the original stories collected by Moe and Asbjornsen).
- Saga of Saints, ISBN 0-8369-0959-3; ISBN 978-0-8369-0959-3. The coming of Christianity.--St. Sunniva and the Seljemen.--St. Olav, Norway's king to all eternity.--St. Hallvard.--St. Magnus, earl of the Orkney islands.--St. Eystein, archbishop of Nidaros.--St. Thorfinn, bishop of Hamar.--Father Karl Schilling, Barnabite. Chapter of this book also published as "A Priest From Norway, The Venerable Karl M. Schilling, CRSP" by the Barnabite Fathers through the North American Voice of Fatima, Youngstown NY, July 1976.
- Stages on the Road is a collection of saints' lives and essays previously published in Catholic periodicals. Published in English by Knopf in 1934. Republished with a foreword by Elizabeth Scalia by Ave Maria Press in 2012 (ISBN 978-0870612589).
- Catherine of Siena (1951). A biography of the fourteenth-century saint Catherine of Siena. Published in English by Sheed and Ward in 1954, it was republished by Ignatius Press in 2009.
  - Catherine of Siena (1954)
  - Catherine of Siena (San Francisco: Ignatius Press, 2009), ISBN 978-1-58617-408-8

== Cultural impact ==
Sigrid Undset and the plot of Kristin Lavransdatter are important elements in the 2006 Academy Award-winning animated short film, The Danish Poet.

== See also ==
- List of female Nobel laureates

== Other sources ==
- Inside the gate: Sigrid Undset's Life at Bjerkebæk by Nan Bentzen Skille, translated by Tiina Nunnally. ISBN 978-82-03-19447-4
- Amdam, Per (1975). "En ny realisme. Historie og samtid". In Beyer, Edvard (ed.). Norges Litteraturhistorie (in Norwegian). Vol. 4. Oslo: Cappelen. pp. 412–439.
- Krane, Borgnild (1970). Sigrid Undset. Liv og meninger (in Norwegian).
- Bayerschmidt, Carl F. 1970. Sigrid Undset. (Twayne's world authors series 107.) New York: Twayne Publishers.
- Nan Bentzen Skille: 2018 Inside the Gate. Sigrid Undset's Life at Bjerkebæk – biography translated by Tiina Nunnally University of Minnesota Press, ISBN 978-1-5179-0496-8
- Undset, Sigrid, and Deal W. Hudson. Sigrid Undset on saints and sinners: new translations and studies; papers presented at a conference sponsored by the Wethersfield Institute, New York City, April 24, 1993. Ignatius Press, 1993.
