= Østerdalens Avis =

Local newspaper of Elverum, Norway

Østerdalens Avis was a local newspaper published in Elverum, Norway.

Its first issue came out on 16 February 1911, and its political alignment was Conservative. At the time, Elverum had two competing Liberal newspapers; Østlandske Tidende and Østlændingen.

Østerdalens Avis was published three times a week from 1911 to 1927, except for the periods 1915–1917 (four times a week) and 1919–1923 (six times a week). Lastly, it was published four times a week from 1927 until it was discontinued. The newspaper was bought by political affiliate Hamar Stiftstidende, effective on 13 May 1929.

== Editors-in-chief ==
Years	Name
1911–1918	Augun Klever
1918–1919	Ole Gillebo
1919	Olaf Paulsen
1919–1920	Ove Ansteinsson
1920–1921	Per Schulstad
1921	Ove Ansteinsson
1921–1923	Erling Lauhn
1923–1927	Alf E. Olaussen
