= Maihaugen =

Museum in Norway

Coordinates: 61°06′46.16″N 10°28′42.36″E

Maihaugen (De Sandvigske Samlinger på Maihaugen, Lillehammer) is one of the most visited tourist attractions in Lillehammer, Norway. Maihaugen, with close to 200 buildings, is one of Northern Europe's largest open-air museums and one of the largest cultural facilities in Norway.

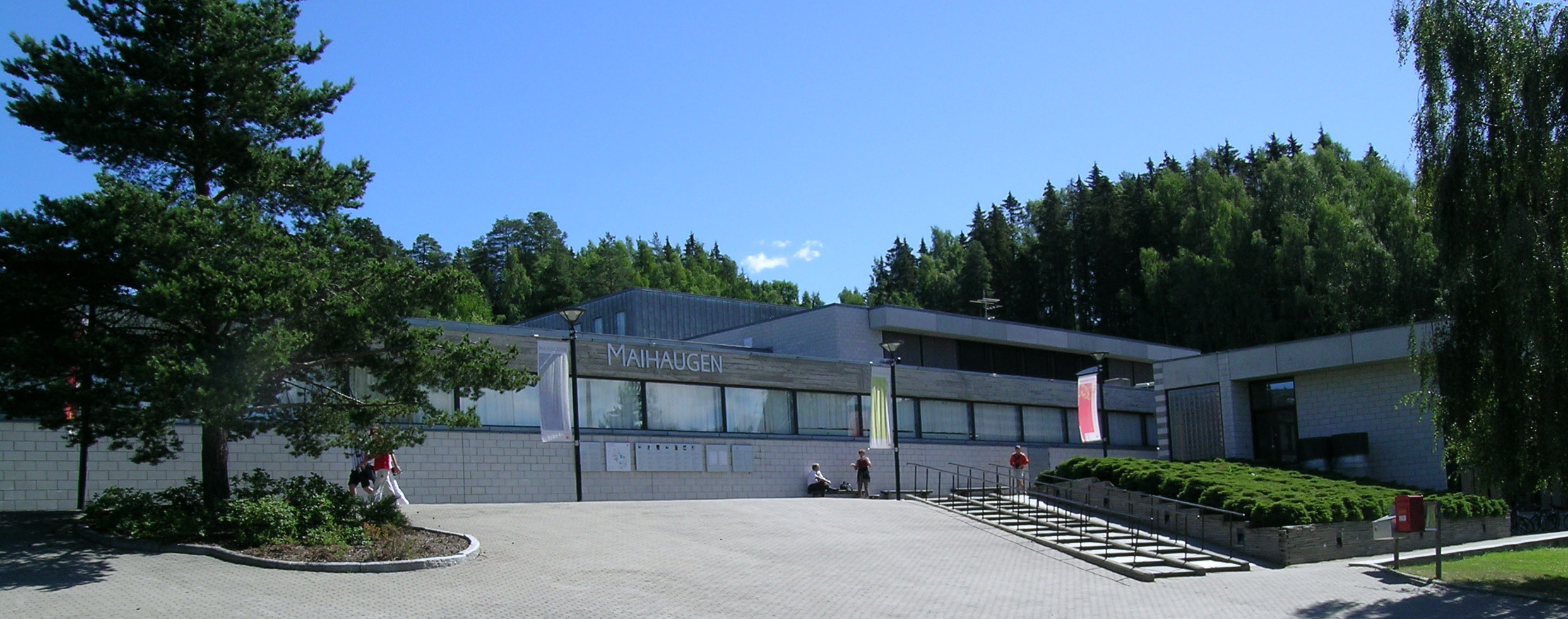
Entrance to Maihaugen

== History ==
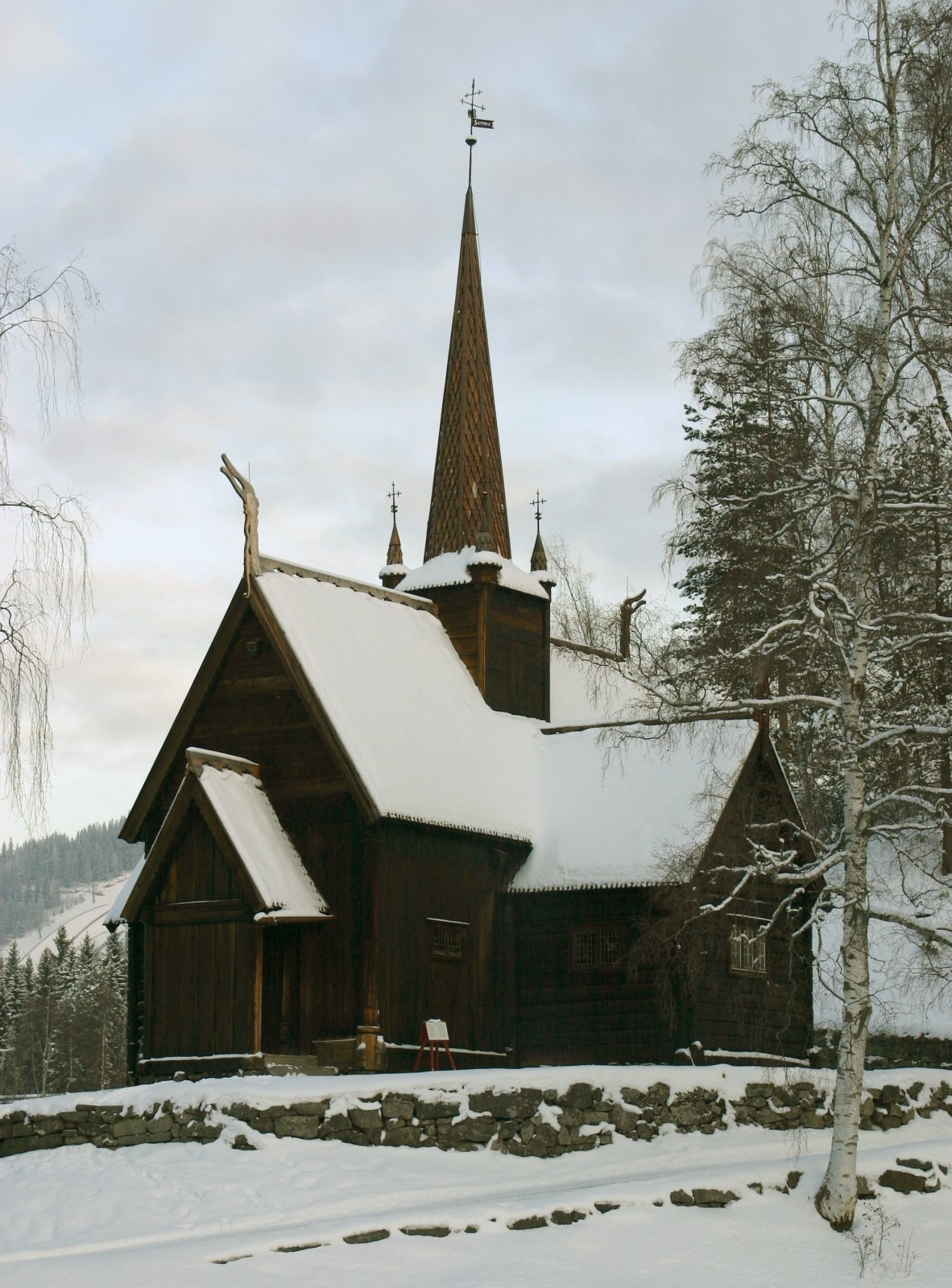
Garmo Stave Church

The founder, Anders Sandvig, collected from old houses and farmyards within Gudbrandsdalen to provide a sample of Norwegian culture and history in a museum. He first started in his backyard, but when his collection grew, in 1901, the town council offered him a permanent site for the museum. In 1904, the city of Lillehammer set aside an area already known as Maihaugen and bought Sandvig's collection and established the Sandvig Collections (Sandvigske Samlinger), the formal name for Maihaugen. Sandvig was at first hired as an unpaid curator but was later appointed the museum's first director. The new site of the museum had been used as a picnic and meeting place for the townspeople. People had met here to celebrate the Norwegian Constitution Day and to light bonfires for Midsummer eve.

Maihaugen tells the history of how people have been living in the Gudbrandsdalen from the Middle Ages until today. Social institutions such as a church, school, post office, railway station, shops, prisons and military facilities are all represented at the museum. The museum has a rich collection of artifacts, furniture, tools and ornaments, ranging in age from the Middle Ages.

Garmo Stave Church is one of the main attractions. In 1882, the church was disassembled and sold to Anders Sandvig, who brought it to Lillehammer, where it was re-erected at Maihaugen in 1920–1921.

Maihaugen also includes a large photography archive and an indoor museum. Constructed in 1959, they were extended in preparation for the 1994 Winter Olympics held in Lillehammer. Maihaugsalen concert hall, with over 700 seats and a large exhibition space, was opened in September 1967.

== Sections ==
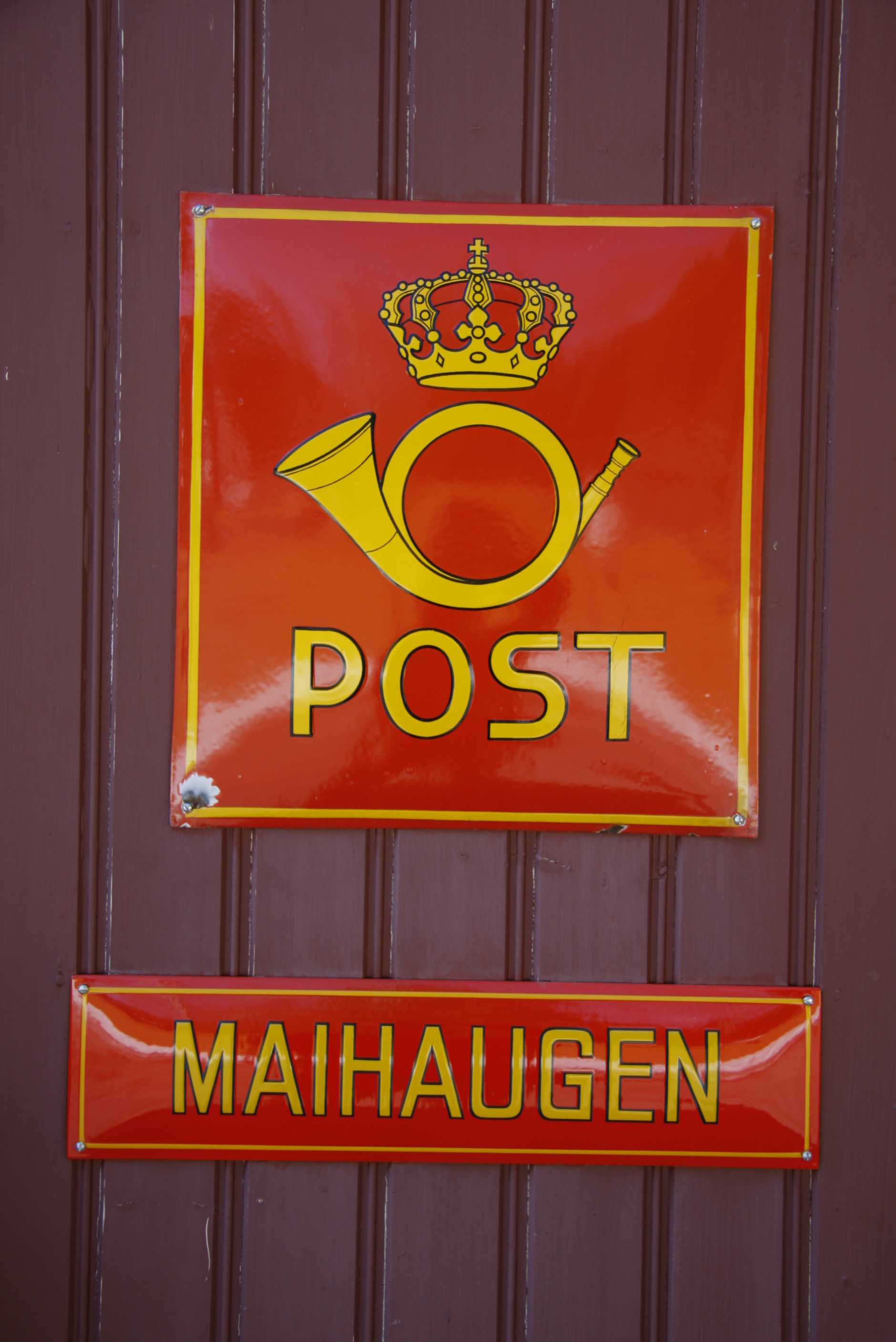
Maihaugen postal sign

The open-air museum is divided into three primary sections, the Rural Collection, Historic Town, and the Residential Area.

- Rural Collection – from the villages in Lillehammer, focusing on the period 1700–1850 but also houses dating back to the 15th century
- Historic Town – collection of buildings from Lillehammer between early 19th century until around 1920
- Residential Area – consists of the time typical single-family homes from nearly all decades of the 20th century

== Related sites ==
The following additional institutions are also under the administration of De Sandvigske Samlinger:

- Aulestad in Gausdal Municipality – Home of Nobel Laureate, Bjørnstjerne Bjørnson
- Bjerkebæk in Lillehammer Municipality – Home of Nobel Laureate, Sigrid Undset
- Norwegian Olympic Museum – Represents all Olympic Games since 1896.
- Norwegian Post Museum – Norway's special museum for mail and philately.

== Gallery ==
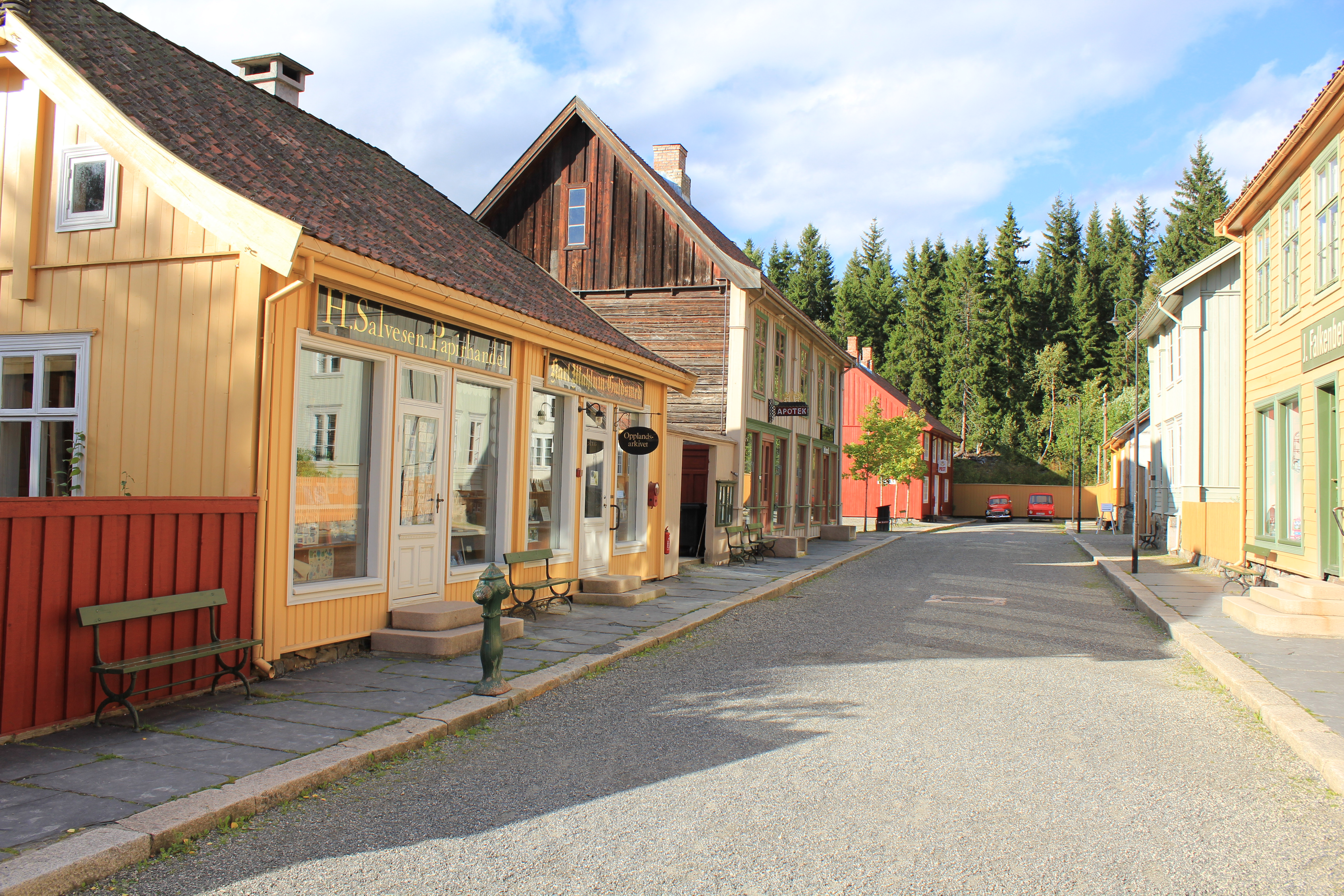
Old town street at Maihaugen Museum

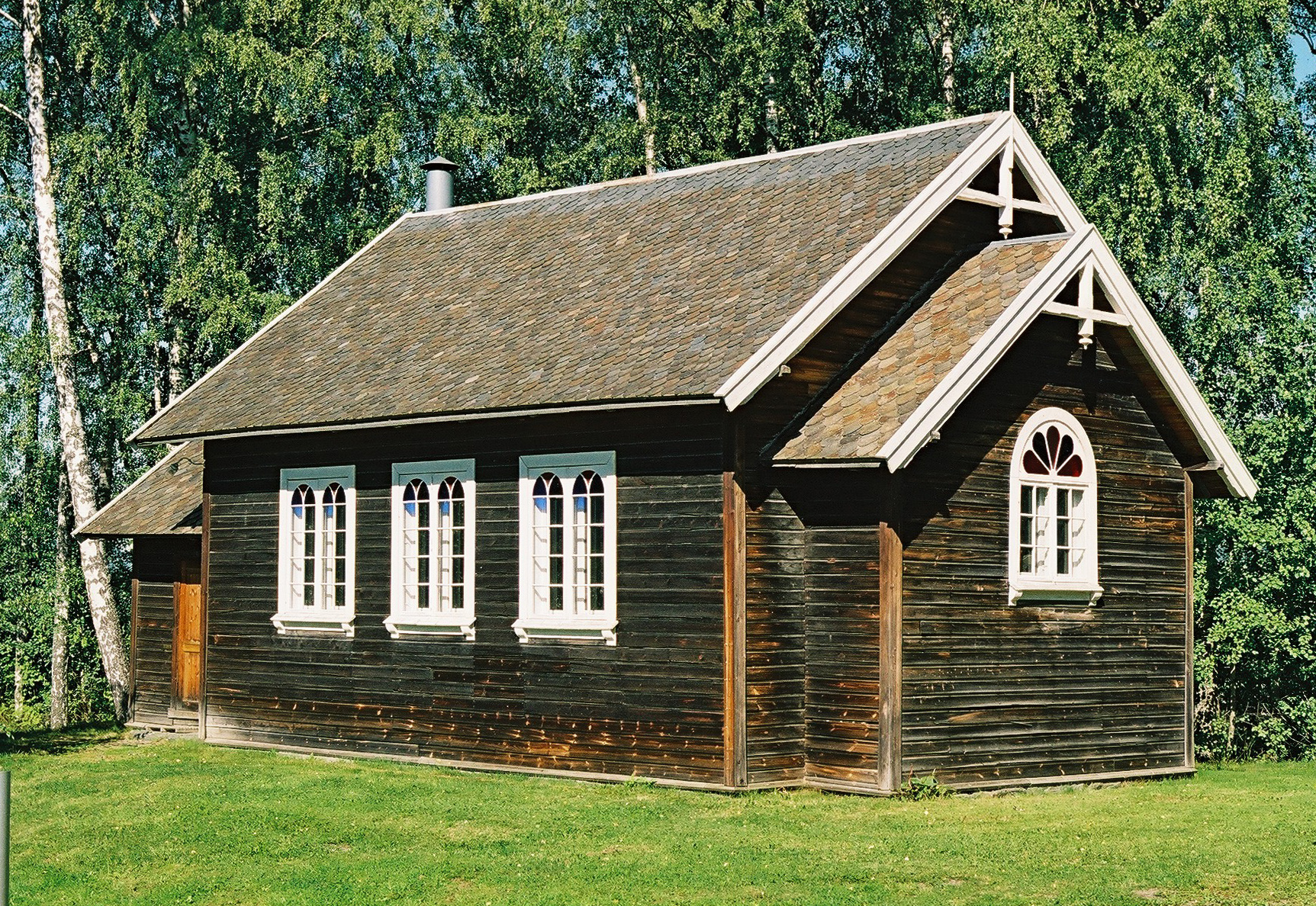
Assembly Hall of the Temperance Movement

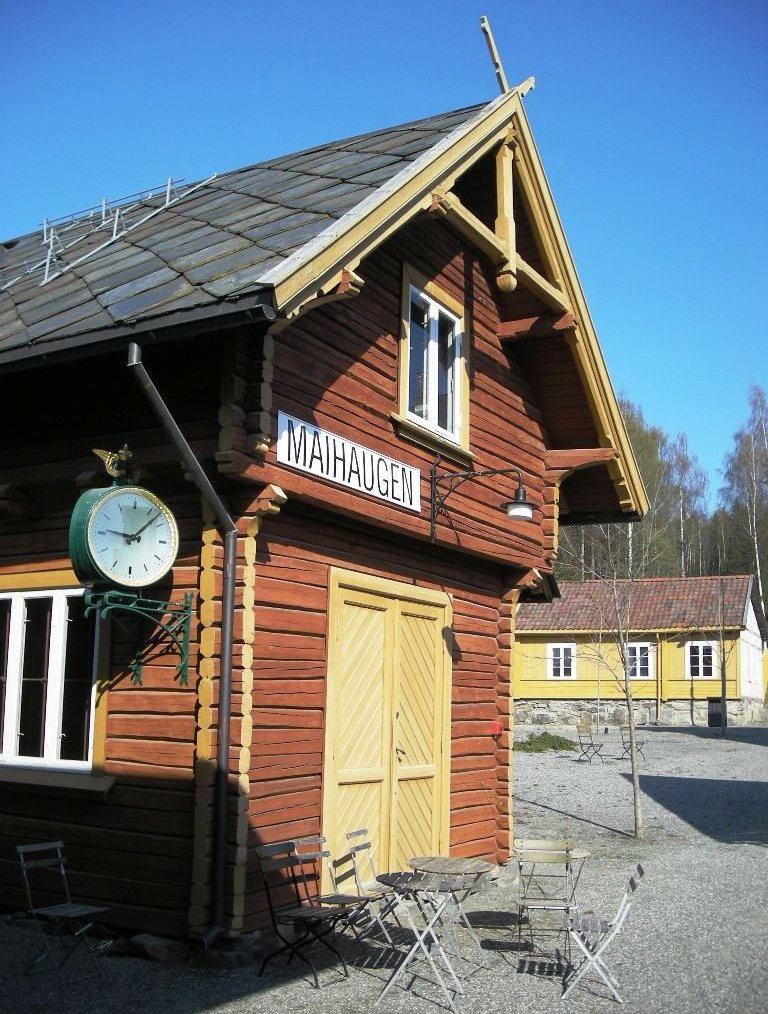
Maihaugen Station

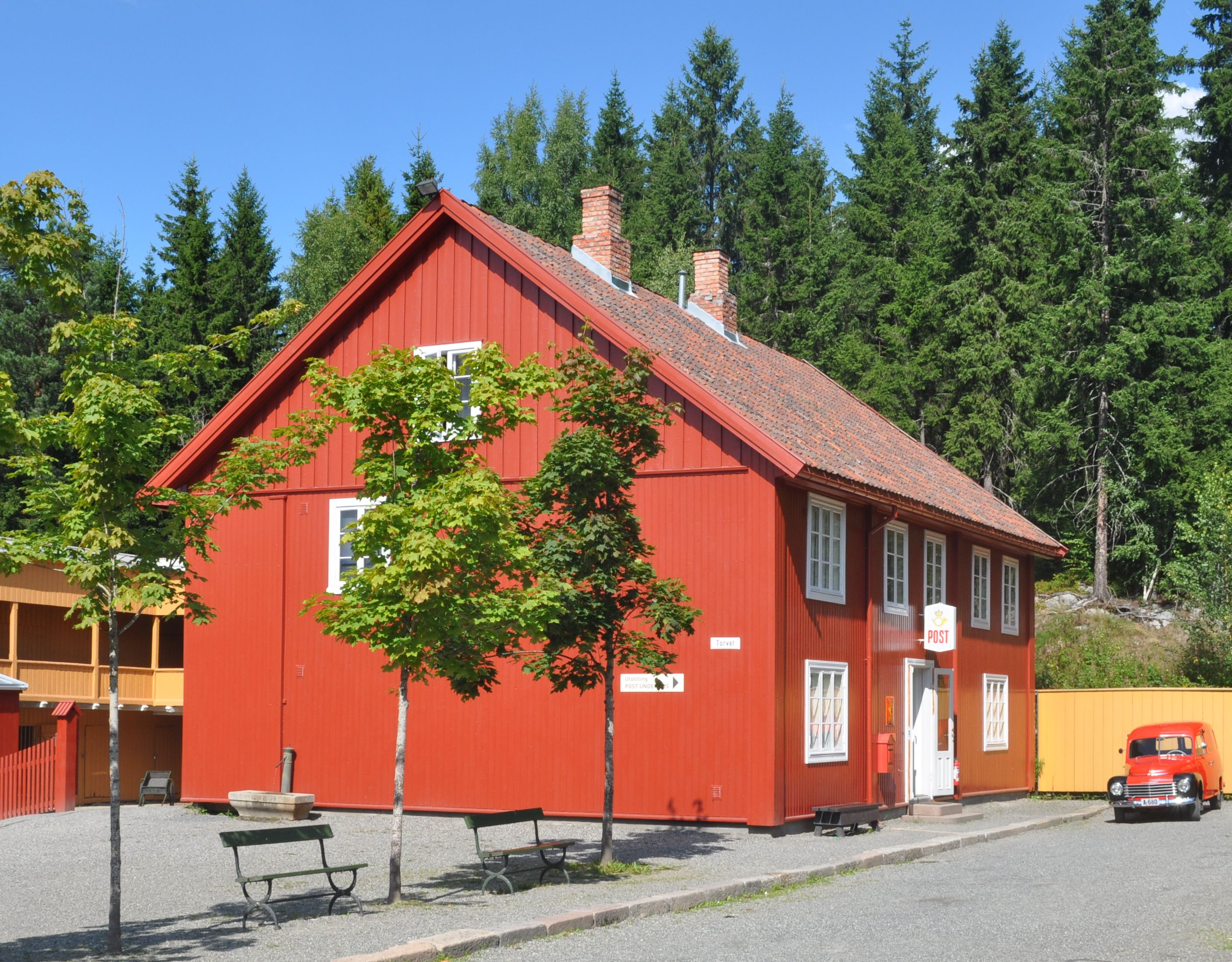
Maihaugen Post Office

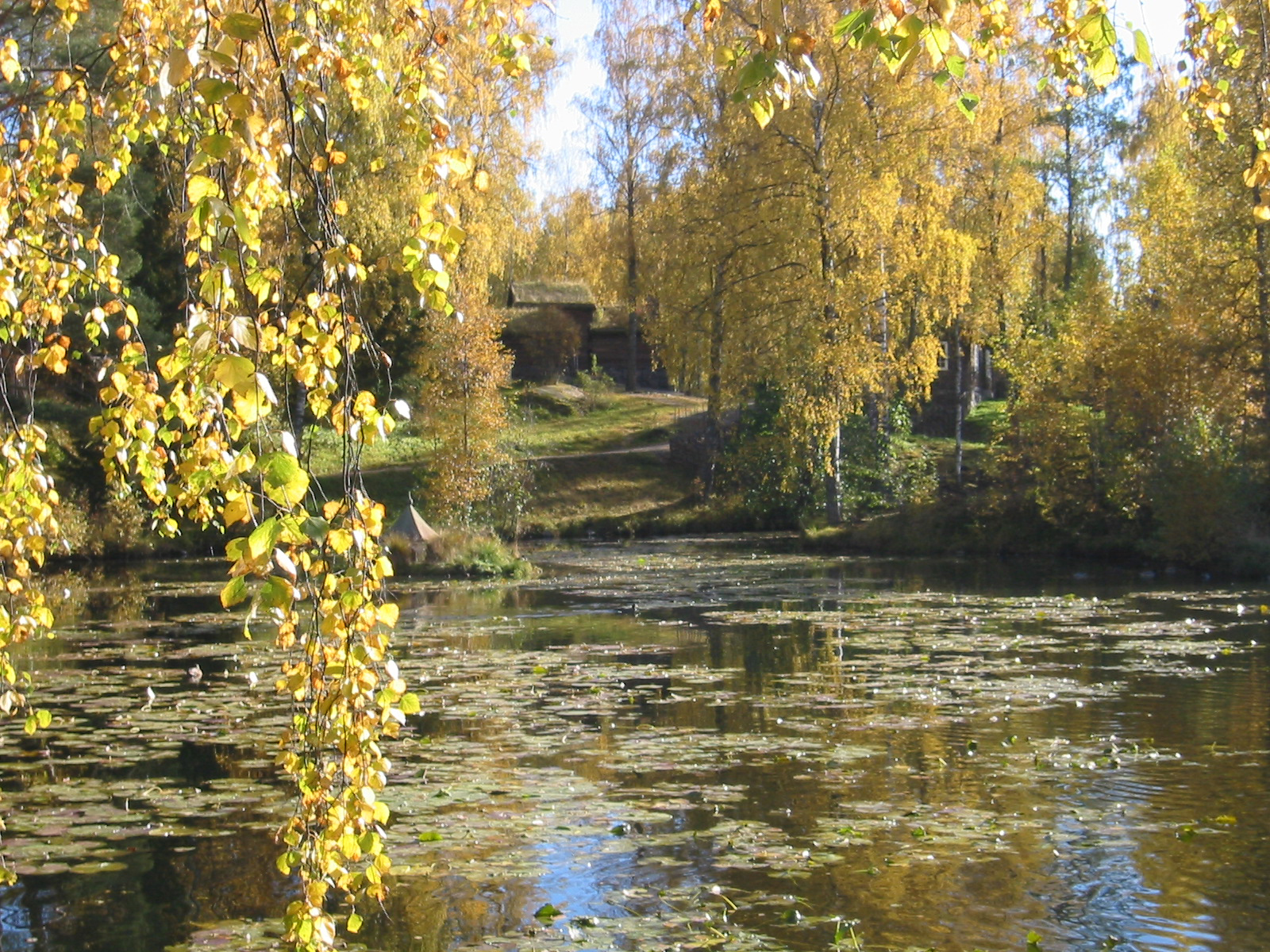
Nordre pond at Maihaugen

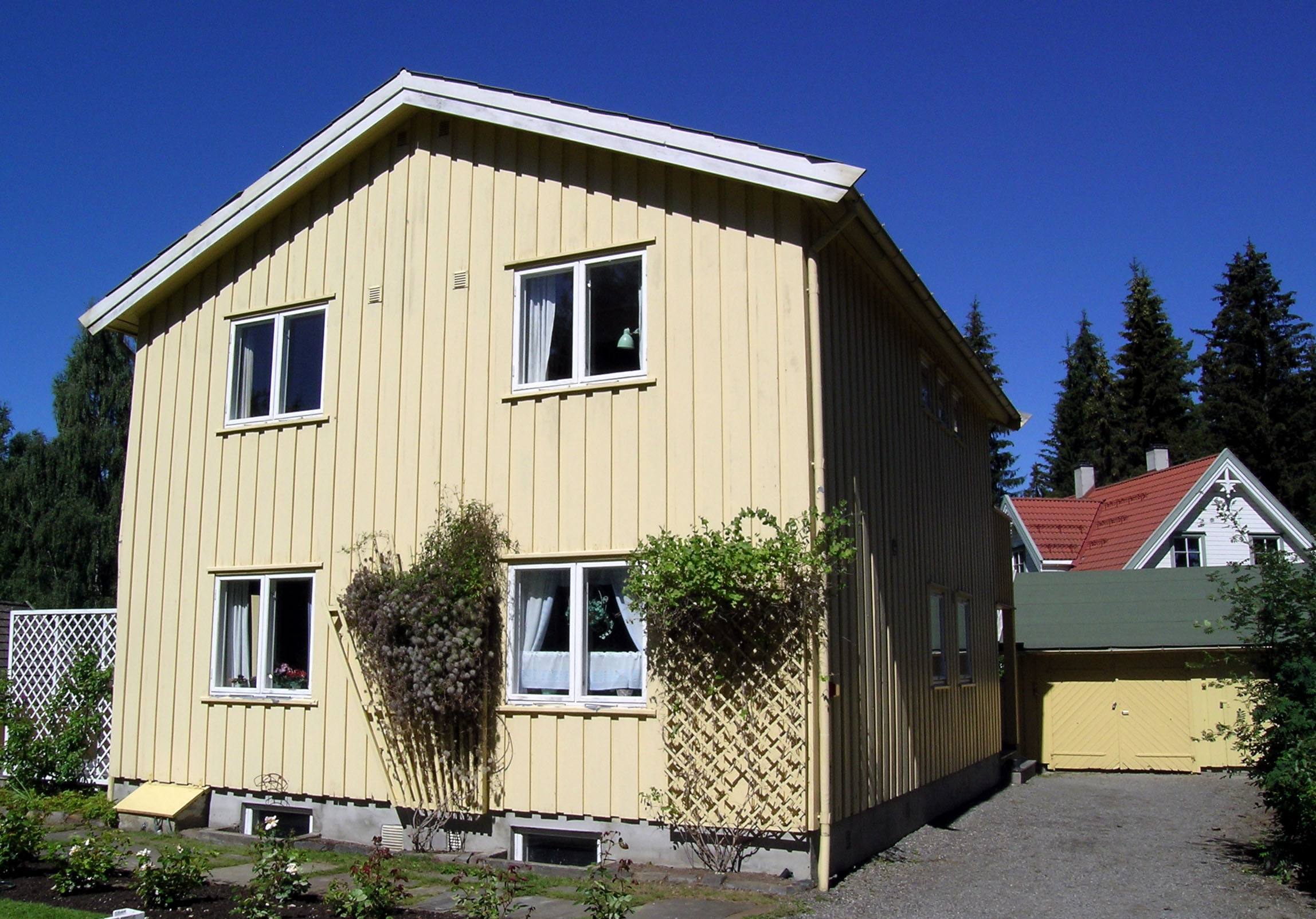
Typical Norwegian house from the 1950s

== Related reading ==
- Buggeland, Tord Maihaugen: De Sandvigske samlinger 100 ar (Cappelen. 1987) ISBN 8202108284
- Hauglid, Anders Ole Maihaugen: The Sandvig Collections guide (Lillehammer: 1994) ISBN 8290241232
- Valen-Sendstad, Fartein The Sandvig collections: Guide to the open air museum (Mariendal. 1968)
