= Anders Sandvig =

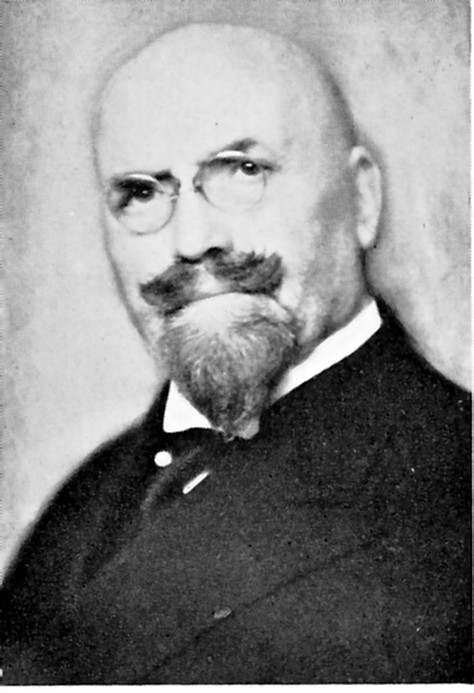
- Born: 11 May 1862; Bud in Møre og Romsdal, Norway
- Died: 11 February 1950 (aged 87); Lillehammer in Oppland, Norway
- Education: University of Oslo
- Occupations: Dentist museum curator
- Employer: Repton School
- Known for: Founder of Maihaugen
- Spouse: Anna Georgine Uchermann (1868–1950)
- Children: Anders Uchermann-Sandvig

Anders Sandvig (11 May 1862 – 11 February 1950) was a Norwegian dentist most noted for having founded Maihaugen, an innovative regional ethnological and architectural museum in Lillehammer Municipality, documenting the vernacular architecture of Gudbrandsdalen.

== Biography ==
Sandvig was born at Bud in Møre og Romsdal, Norway. He was the son of Sjur Sandvig and Maren Knudsdotter Hustad. He first worked as an apprentice with a jeweler in Kristiansund where he often performed gold work for dentists. He was trained as a dentist in Kristiansund with later training at the University of Oslo and in Berlin. During his stay in Germany, he was diagnosed with tuberculosis. In 1885, he moved to Lillehammer to start a dentist practice and promote his recovery. At this time he was the only dentist in Gudbrandsdalen.

On a travel to Skiaaker Municipality (later spelled Skjåk) in 1894, he came to the realization that Norwegian farmers had not yet begun to appreciate their cultural heritage. He acquired his first house, a dwelling house built in 1764 at Skiaaker. The building was moved to the large property he had near Lillehammer.

By the turn of the century he had six antiquarian buildings and a large amount of other objects. In 1902, the Society for Lillehammer Byes Vel bought the collection and had it moved to Maihaugen just outside of Lillehammer.

The city of Lillehammer set aside an area known as Maihaugen and bought Sandvig's collection and established the Sandvig Collections (De Sandvigske Samlinger) in 1904. Sandvig was at first hired as unpaid curator, but was later appointed the museum's first director. Sandvig also traveled extensively to promote ethnological museums, including Vesterheim in Decorah, Iowa.

== Personal life ==
In 1889 he married Anna Georgine Uchermann (1868–1950). In 1900 he became a knight and in 1907 commander of the Order of St. Olav. He was also commander of the Swedish Order of Vasa. He retired from the museum in 1947 at 85 years of age. He died in 1950 at Lillehammer.

== Other sources ==
- Engen, Arnfinn (2004) Samlaren Anders Sandvig (Samlaget: Oslo) ISBN 9788252164602
- Jacobsen, Gaute; Wallin Weihe, Hans-Jørgen (2012) Anders Sandvig og Maihaugen (Hertevig Akademiske: Stavanger) ISBN 978-82-8217-202-8
