= Lillehammer (disambiguation) =

Lillehammer is a municipality in Innlandet county, Norway.

Lillehammer may also refer to:

== Places ==
- Lillehammer (town), the administrative centre of Lillehammer Municipality in Innlandet county, Norway
- Lillehammer Church, a church in Lillehammer Municipality, Innlandet county, Norway
- Lillehammer Hospital, a hospital in Lillehammer Municipality, Innlandet county, Norway
- Lillehammer Station, a railway station in Lillehammer Municipality, Innlandet county, Norway

== Sport ==
- Lillehammer FK, a Norwegian football club from Lillehammer
- Lillehammer SK, a Norwegian skiing (Nordic and alpine) club from Lillehammer
- Lillehammer Wolfpack, an American football team based in Lillehammer

== Other ==
- Lillehammer affair, the mistaken 1973 killing of Ahmed Bouchikhi by Mossad agents
- Lilyhammer, a Norwegian–American crime dramedy television series starring Steven Van Zandt
- Hallvard Lillehammer, a professor of philosophy at Birkbeck College, University of London
