= St. Mary Church, Lillehammer =

Catholic church in Innlandet, Norway

St. Mary Church
- Mariakirken; Mariakirken på Lillehammer
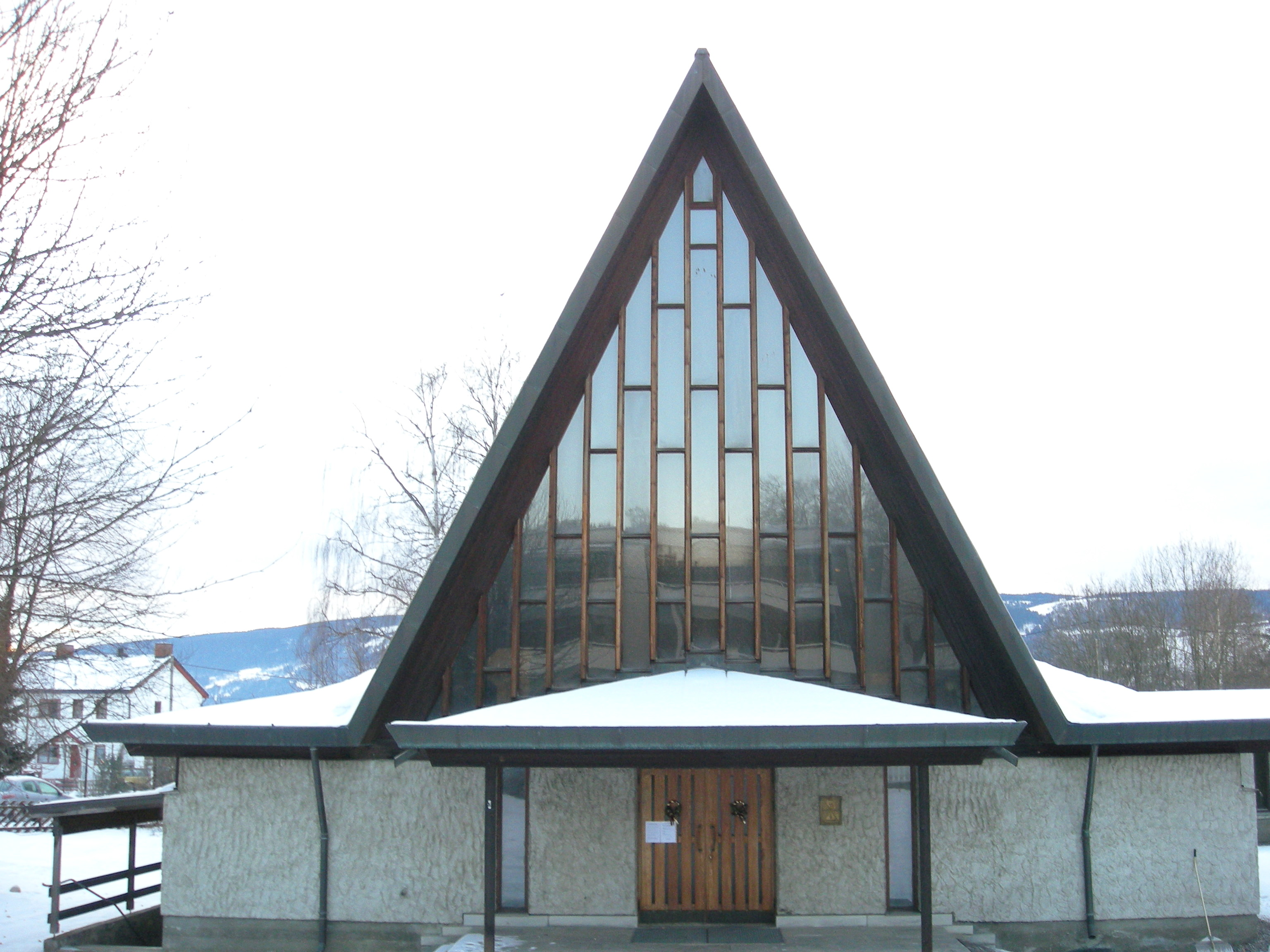
- View of the church
- St. Mary Church
- 61°06′26″N 10°28′01″E
- Location: Lillehammer, Innlandet
- Country: Norway
- Denomination: Roman Catholic Church
- Churchmanship: Catholic

History
- Status: Parish church

Architecture
- Functional status: Active

St. Mary Church (Norwegian: Mariakirken) is the church of the Catholic parish of St. Mary in Lillehammer Municipality in Innlandet county, Norway. The parish the western part of Innlandet county. The church is situated in Suttestad, an area to the south of the city of Lillehammer. The parish also operates chapels of ease in Gjøvik, Oppa, and Dokka.

The parish was established in 1956, with worship taking place in a private chapel until 1970. In that year, the main church was constructed to plans by architect Carl Corwin. In 2010, the church was consecrated by Bishop Bernt Eidsvig, and the altar consecrated with relics.

== See also ==
Media related to Mariakirken, Lillehammer at Wikimedia Commons

- Roman Catholicism in Norway
