= Thallaug =

Thallaug is a surname. Notable people with the surname include:

- Anita Thallaug (born 1938), Norwegian actress and singer
- Axel Thallaug (1866–1938), Norwegian lawyer and politician
- Edith Thallaug (1929–2020), Norwegian actress and opera singer
- Haakon Thallaug (1903–1984), Norwegian barrister
