= Vingnes =

Village in Lillehammer Municipality, Norway

- Village
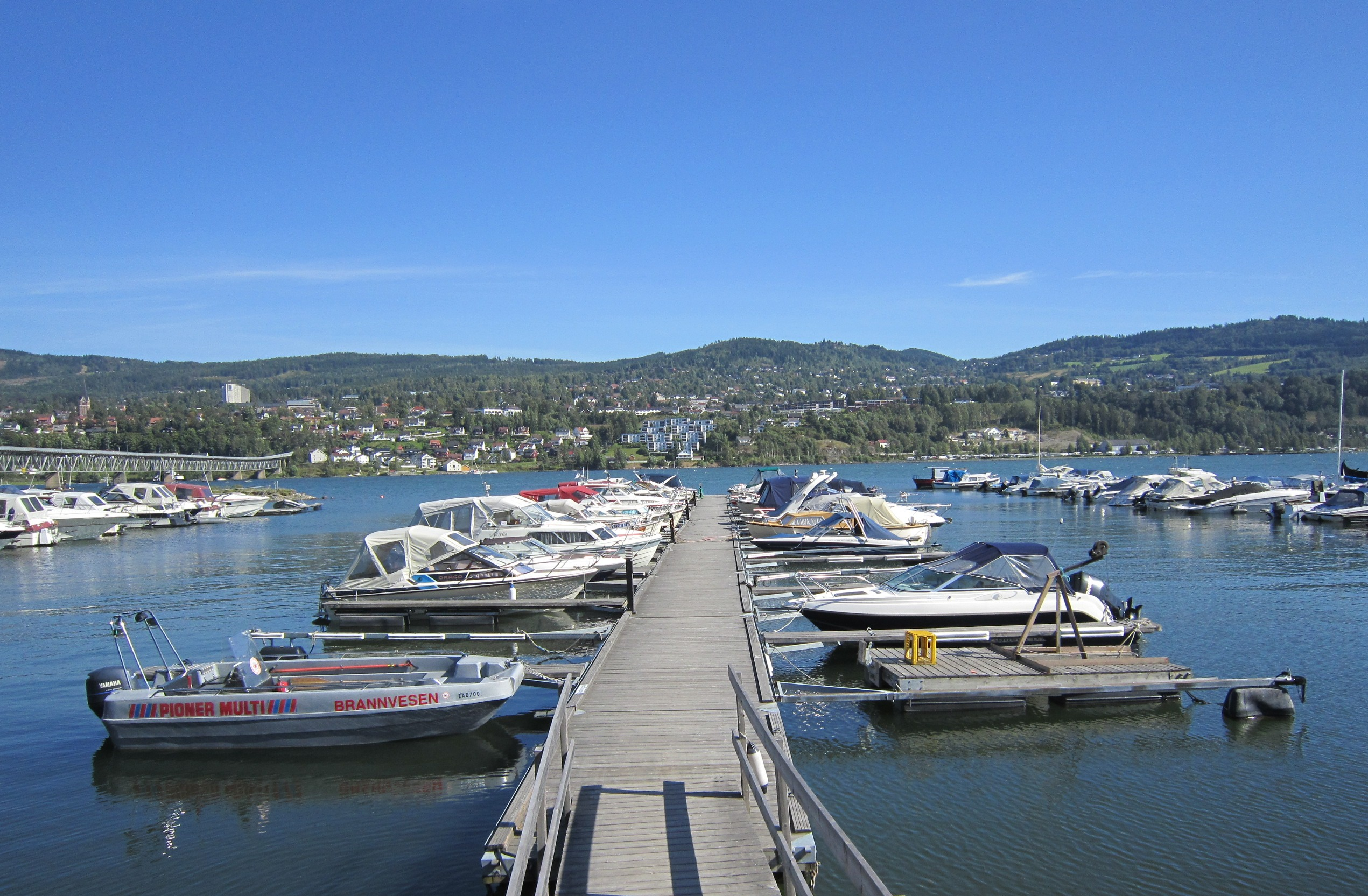
- View of the village harbour
- Interactive map of Vingnes
- Location within Innlandet Location within Norway
- Coordinates: 61.10512°N 10.44453°E
- Country: Norway
- Region: Eastern Norway
- County: Innlandet
- District: Gudbrandsdalen
- Municipality: Lillehammer Municipality

Area
  - Total: 0.97 km^{2} (0.37 sq mi)
- Elevation: 130 m (430 ft)

Population (2021)
  - Total: 1,524
  - Density: 1,571/km^{2} (4,070/sq mi)
- Time zone: UTC+01:00 (CET)
  - Summer (DST): UTC+02:00 (CEST)
- Post Code: 2608 Lillehammer

Vingnes is a village in Lillehammer Municipality in Innlandet county, Norway. The village is located on the west bank of lake Mjøsa, just across the Gudbrandsdalslågen river from the town of Lillehammer. The European route E6 highway runs through the village, and connecting it by bridge to the town of Lillehammer.

The 0.97-square-kilometre (240-acre) village has a population (2024) of 1,524 and a population density of 1,571 inhabitants per square kilometre (4,070/sq mi).
