= Jørstadmoen =

Village in Lillehammer Municipality, Norway

- Village
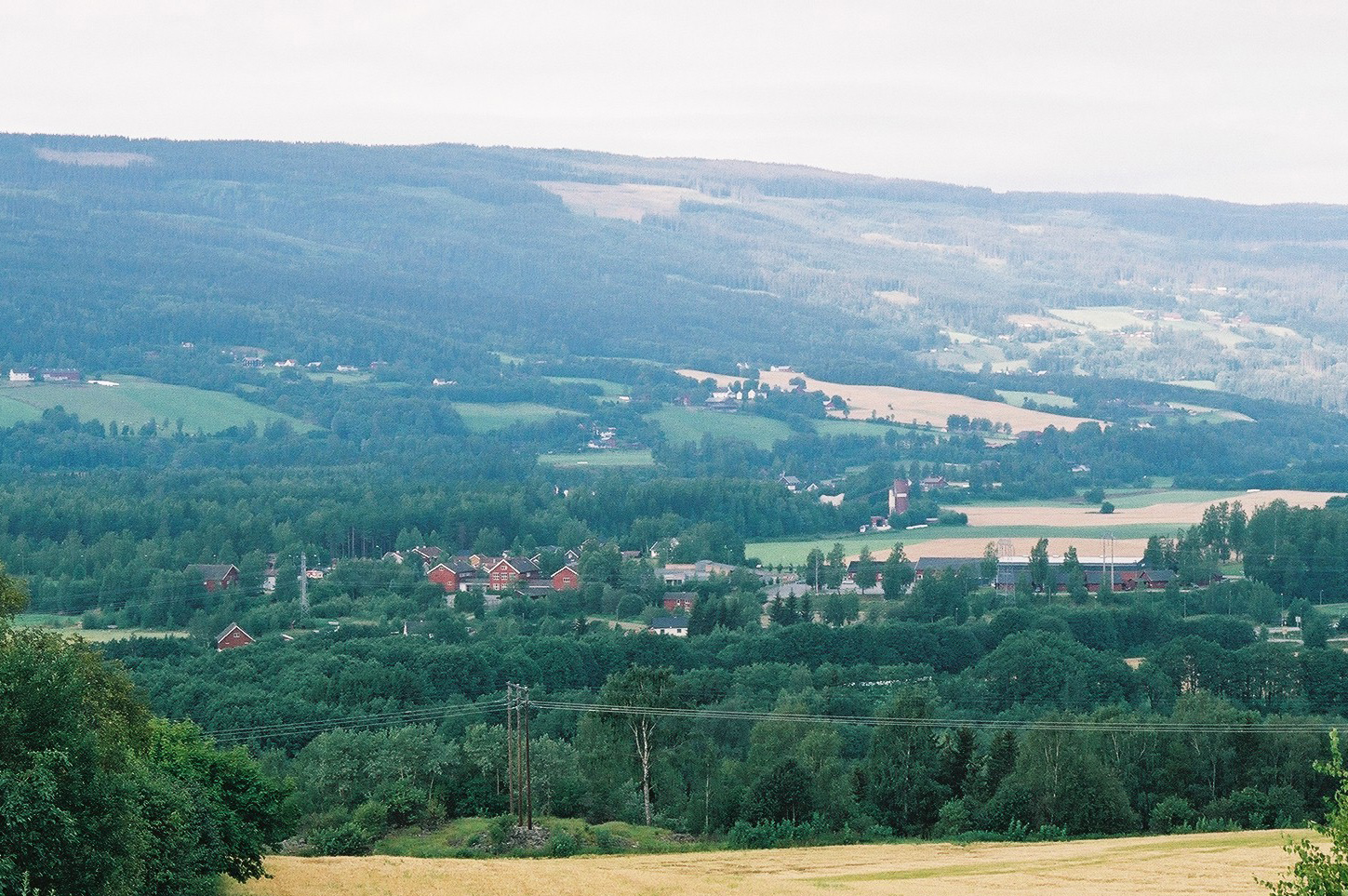
- View of the village
- Interactive map of Jørstadmoen
- Location within Innlandet Location within Norway
- Coordinates: 61.14558°N 10.38458°E
- Country: Norway
- Region: Eastern Norway
- County: Innlandet
- District: Gudbrandsdalen
- Municipality: Lillehammer Municipality

Area
  - Total: 0.8 km^{2} (0.31 sq mi)
- Elevation: 138 m (453 ft)

Population (2024)
  - Total: 656
  - Density: 820/km^{2} (2,100/sq mi)
- Time zone: UTC+01:00 (CET)
  - Summer (DST): UTC+02:00 (CEST)
- Post Code: 2625 Fåberg

Jørstadmoen is a village in Lillehammer Municipality in Innlandet county, Norway. It is located in the Gudbrandsdalen valley along the river Gudbrandsdalslågen, about 4 kilometres (2.5 mi) northwest of Lillehammer, and just across the river from the village of Fåberg.

The 0.8-square-kilometre (200-acre) village has a population (2024) of 656 and a population density of 820 inhabitants per square kilometre (2,100/sq mi). The village has a school, grocery store, and sports facilities.

== Military base ==
The village is the site of Jørstadmoen leir, a military base that has been in use since the 18th century. The base is now the headquarters of the Norwegian Cyber Defence Force, a branch of the Norwegian Armed Forces responsible for military communications and defensive cyberwarfare. The Cyber Defence Force was established on 18 September 2012 and employs approximately 1,500 personnel across more than 60 locations in Norway, with Jørstadmoen serving as its main base. The base is also home to the Cyber Engineer Academy (Norwegian: Cyberingeniørskolen), an officer school that provides training in communication and information system operations.

== World War II ==
During the German occupation of Norway, the military camp at Jørstadmoen was significantly expanded by the occupying forces, serving as an infantry base and hospital for German units.

=== Teacher internment ===
In March 1942, the camp was used to intern Norwegian teachers who had refused to join the Nazi-aligned NS teachers' union or teach the Nazi curriculum. Approximately 686 teachers were held at Jørstadmoen before being deported to Kirkenes in northern Norway for forced labour. This episode was part of a broader nonviolent resistance movement by Norwegian teachers against the Nazification of education, which ultimately succeeded in preventing the implementation of fascist curricula in Norwegian schools.

=== Soviet prisoner-of-war camp ===
Jørstadmoen also served as the site of Stalag 303, one of four major prisoner-of-war camps for Soviet prisoners of war in occupied Norway. The camp had a capacity of approximately 30,000 prisoners, with an estimated 70,000 prisoners passing through during the occupation. At the time of liberation, Stalag 303 had 87 sub-camps throughout southern Norway. Conditions at the camp were described by witnesses as among the worst in Norway, with severe overcrowding, poor sanitation, and inadequate medical care. A total of 954 prisoners died at the camp and are buried at the nearby Jørstadmoen War Cemetery.

== War cemetery ==
Jørstadmoen War Cemetery (Jørstadmoen krigskirkegård) is located just outside the military base. It contains the graves of Soviet, Yugoslav, and Polish prisoners of war who died at the camp during World War II. The cemetery is one of six major Soviet war cemeteries in southern Norway maintained by the Norwegian War Graves Service. A rededication project to mark the names of the 25 Yugoslav prisoners of war buried there has been underway.
