= Nevelfjell =

Mountain in Innlandet, Norway

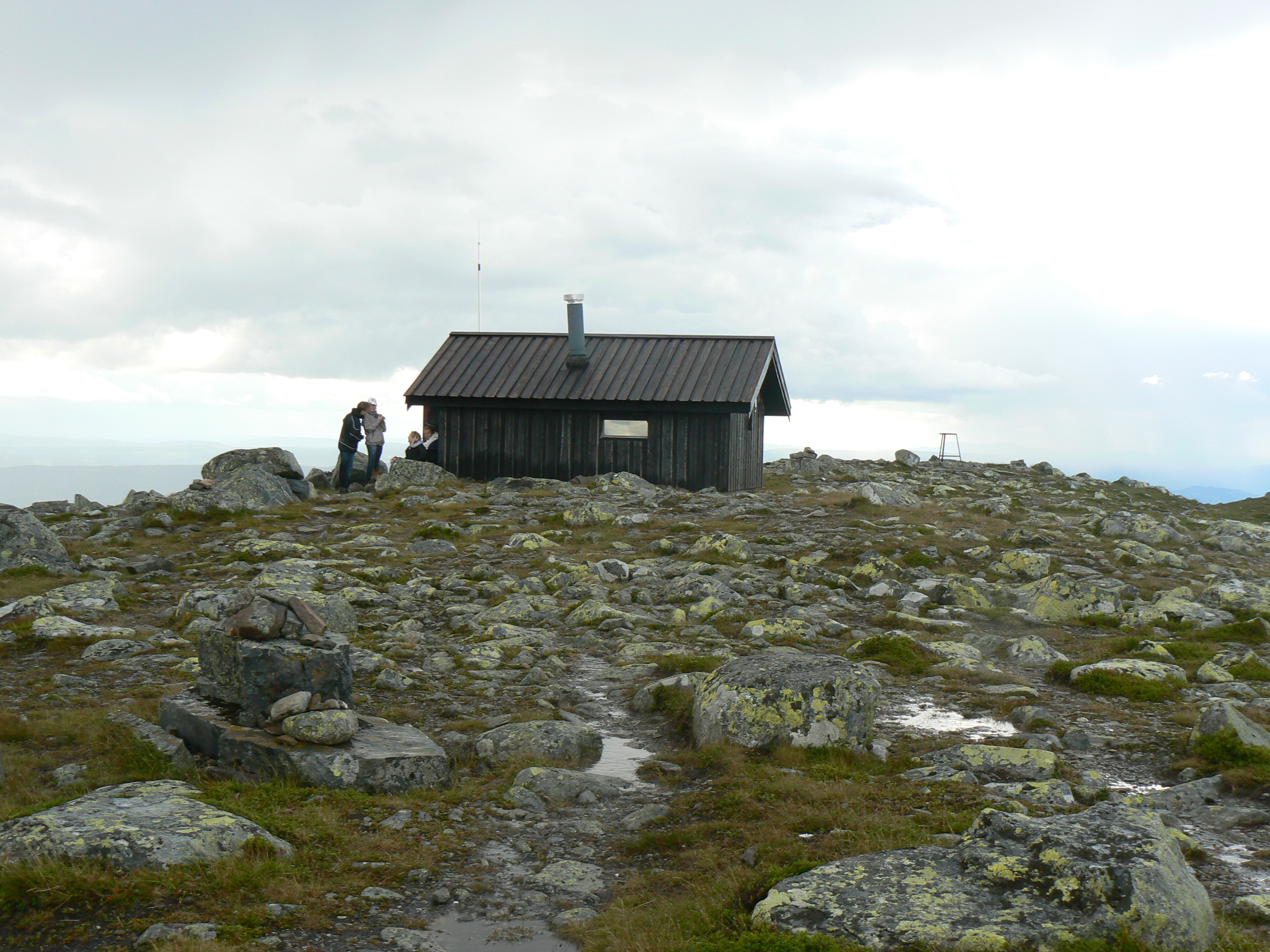
- Top of Nevelfjell with the Nevelhytta hiking cabin

Highest point
- Elevation: 1,089 m (3,573 ft)
- Prominence: 181 m (594 ft)
- Isolation: 19.5 km (12.1 mi)
- Coordinates: 61°12′16″N 10°34′01″E

Geography
- Interactive map of the mountain
- Location: Innlandet, Norway

Nevelfjell is a mountain in Lillehammer Municipality in Innlandet county, Norway. The 1,089-metre (3,573 ft) tall mountain is the highest point in the municipality. The mountain sits about 11 kilometres (6.8 mi) northeast of the town of Lillehammer, about 350 metres (1,150 ft) to the south of the municipal border with Øyer Municipality.

Nevelfjell is a popular destination in the Lillehammer area both in winter and in summer. On clear days there is a good panoramic view of a wide area, including peaks in the Jotunheimen and Rondane mountain ranges. There are hiking and ski trails to the top of Nevelfjell and a small hiking cabin named "Nevelhytta".

== See also ==
- List of mountains of Norway by height
