= Ingunn Trosholmen =

Norwegian politician

- Born: 5 March 1976 (age 50)
- Occupations: Schoolteacher; Politician
- Political party: Labour Party

Ingunn Trosholmen (born 5 March 1976) is a Norwegian schoolteacher and politician for the Labour Party.

She was elected deputy representative to the Storting from Oppland for the period 2017–2021. She has served as mayor of Lillehammer from 2019 to 2023.

In October 2023, she was mentioned as a possible candidate for the Støre Cabinet, with NRK mentioning the post as Minister of Education. Instead, she was assigned State Secretary at the Office of the Prime Minister from October 2023.
