= Margit Haslund =

Norwegian women's advocate and politician

Margit Haslund (10 September 1885 – 3 September 1963) was a Norwegian women's advocate and local politician.

Margit Løkke was born in Oslo. She sat in the city council in Lillehammer from 1928 to 1940, where she represented the Conservatives. In 1940, she became mayor of the city, after the standing mayor asked for leave and the deputy mayor did not want this position. She was the first female mayor in a Norwegian city. During the German occupation of Norway, she was a member of the home front civilian organization, Sivorg. Haslund died 3 September 1963. A street in Lillehammer is named in her honor.
