= Nordseter =

Skiing area in Norway

Coordinates: 61°10′N 10°37′E

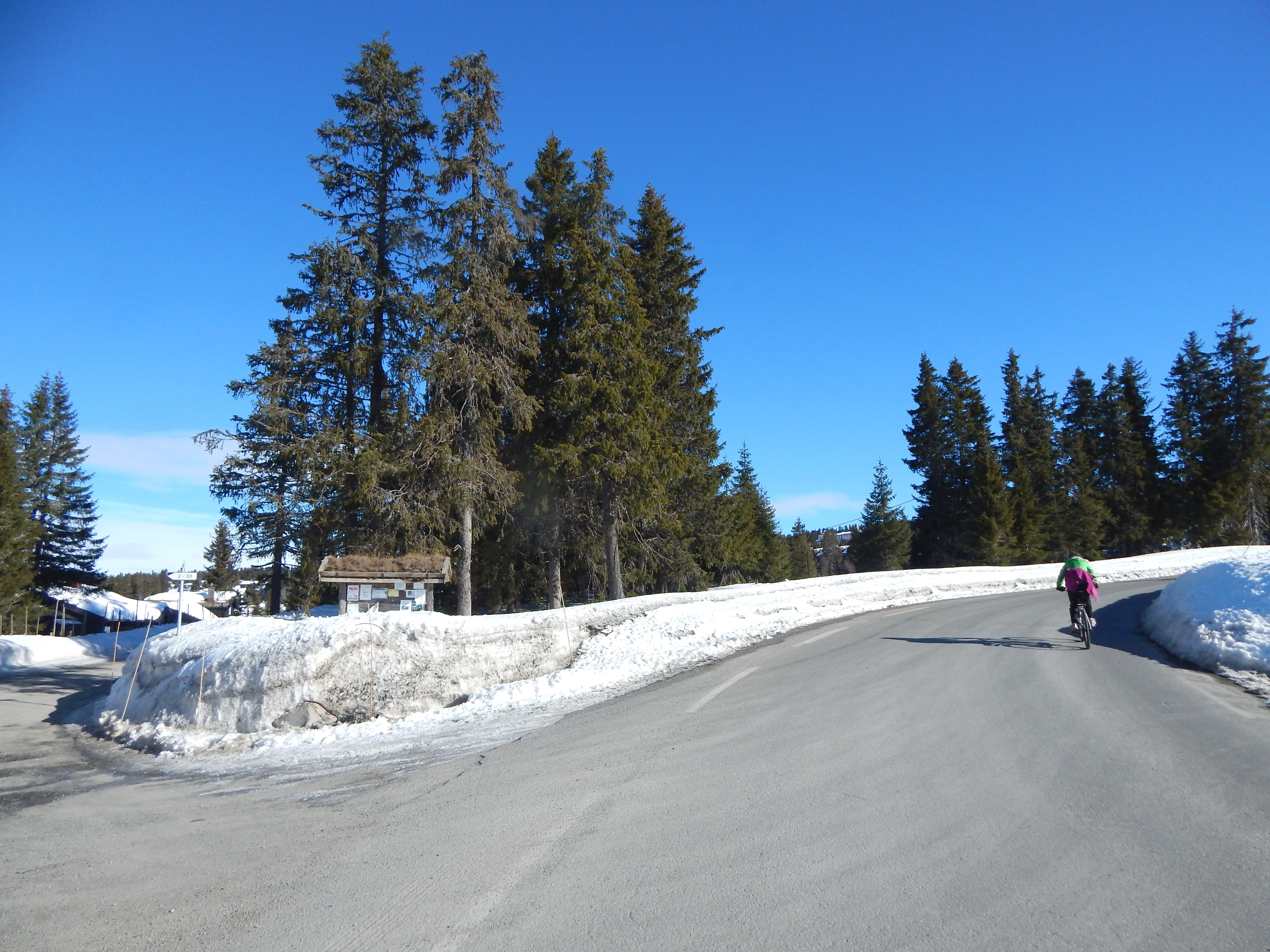
County road 2520 (formerly 311) at Nordseter

Nordseter is a mountain cross country skiing area located near Fåberg in Lillehammer Municipality, Norway, not very far from Sjusjøen. The area is located at an altitude of approximately 850 metres (2,790 ft) above sea level, and offers skiing from December through to the end of March. In the summers, the area is also popular for the locals and a growing number of tourists with many activities such as walking, kayaking, cycling, small game hunting and fishing.

The area has been used for centuries as summer farms, where local farmers take advantage of the thaw and bring their animals into the lush mountainside to feed. In the early 1900s, the first guest houses were built to entertain tourists and travellers.
