= Haakon Thallaug =

Norwegian barrister

Haakon Thallaug (26 April 1903 – 1984) was a Norwegian barrister.

He was born in Lillehammer as a son of attorney and politician Axel Thallaug (1866–1938) and Julie Louise Augusta Prytz (1877–1929). In 1929 he married Ingeborg Benedicte Hagerup Thoresen, daughter of ship-owner Ole Røed Thoresen.

He finished his secondary education in 1922 and graduated from the Royal Frederick University with the cand.jur. degree in 1928. He studied copyright law in Munich for one year, and then started as a junior solicitor in Lillehammer in 1929. He partnered up with barrister Eilif Moe in 1938 in the law firm Thallaug og Moe, but ran his own law firm from 1954. During the war he was imprisoned, and from 1945 to 1946 he was the acting police chief of Oppland.

He was a prominent figure in the cultural life of Sør-Gudbrandsdalen. He chaired De Sandvigske Samlinger from 1964 to 1975, having chaired the friends' association since 1939. He also chaired the supervisory committee of Aulestad from 1954 and the council of the Nansen Academy since 1966. He chaired Mesna Bruk from 1955, Lillehammer Bryggeri from 1955 to 1967 (board member since 1950), Oplandske Dampskibsselskap from 1961 to 1968 (later board member) and Mesnaliens Kursted from 1967 (board member since 1939). He died in 1984.
