= Axel Thallaug =

Norwegian lawyer and politician

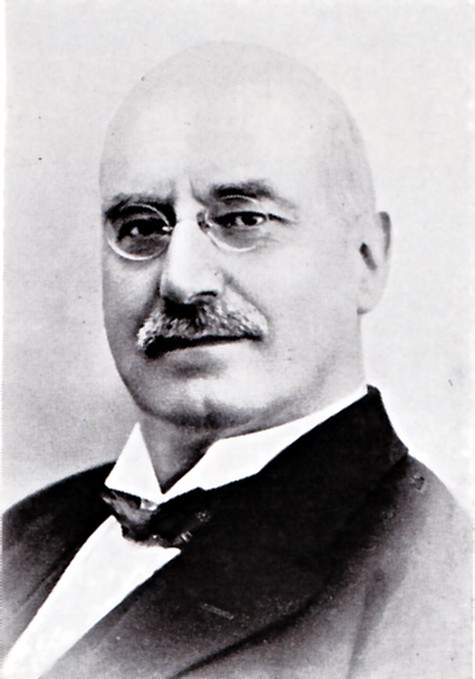
Axel Thallaug.

Axel Andreas Thallaug (15 April 1866 – 17 March 1938) was a Norwegian lawyer and politician for the Conservative Party from Lillehammer.

He received his law degree in 1889. He was a local politician from 1894 to 1938, and a member of the Parliament of Norway from 1903 to 1918. He was a deputy member of the Norwegian Nobel Committee from 1925 to 1936, and a regular member from 1931 to 1933.

He was the father of Haakon Thallaug.
