= Lillehammer Church =

Church in Innlandet, Norway

- Lillehammer kirke
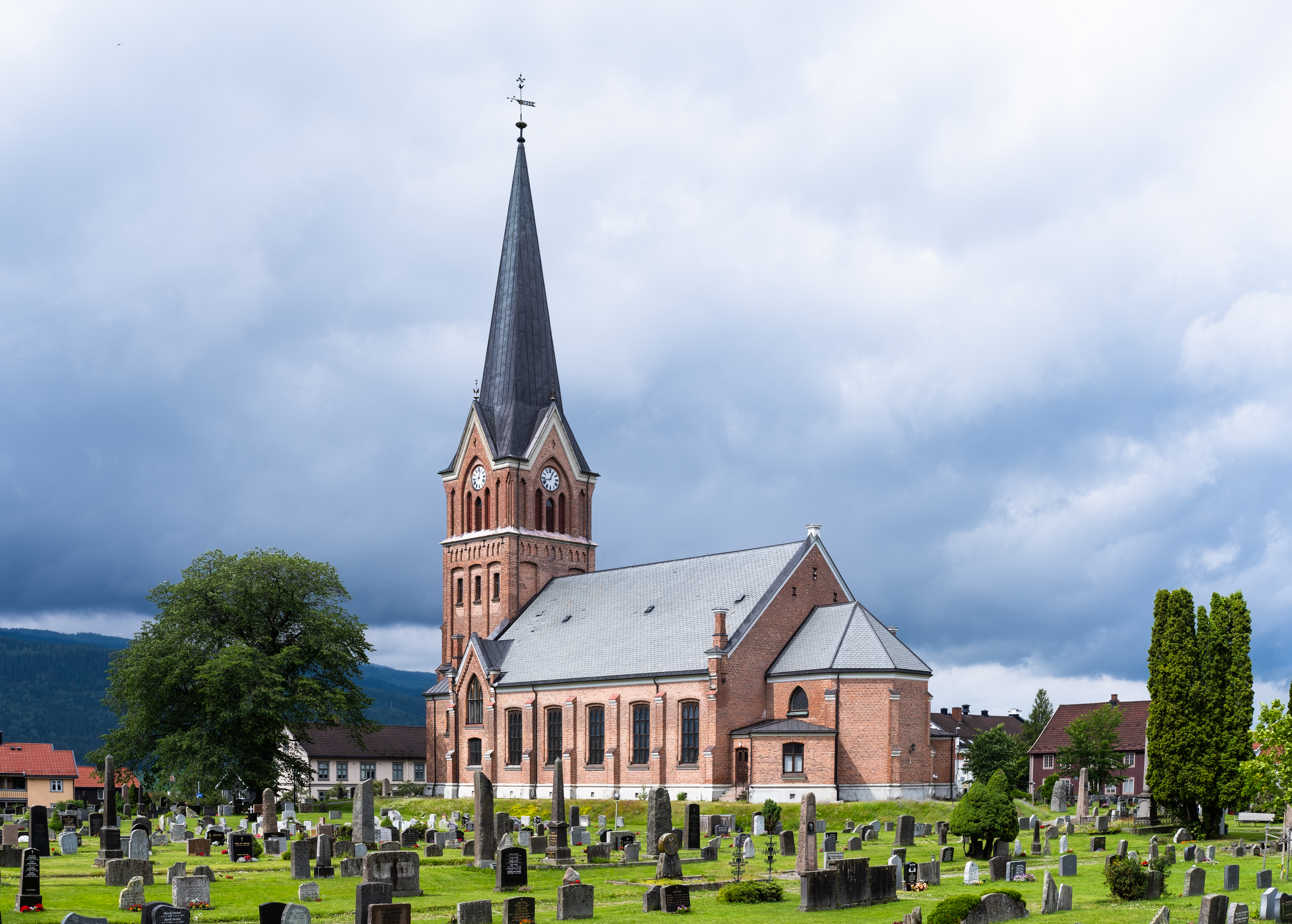
- View of the church
- Lillehammer Church
- 61°06′41″N 10°27′52″E
- Location: Lillehammer Municipality, Innlandet
- Country: Norway
- Denomination: Church of Norway
- Churchmanship: Evangelical Lutheran

History
- Status: Parish church
- Founded: 13th century
- Consecrated: 14 June 1882

Architecture
- Functional status: Active
- Architect: Henrik Thrap-Meyer
- Architectural type: Long church
- Completed: 1882 (144 years ago)

Specifications
- Capacity: 650
- Materials: Brick

Administration
- Diocese: Hamar bispedømme
- Deanery: Sør-Gudbrandsdal prosti
- Parish: Lillehammer
- Norwegian Cultural Heritage Site
- Type: Church
- Status: Protected
- ID: 84305

Lillehammer Church (Norwegian: Lillehammer kirke) is a parish church of the Church of Norway in Lillehammer Municipality in Innlandet county, Norway. It is located in the town of Lillehammer. It is the church for the Lillehammer parish which is the seat of the Sør-Gudbrandsdal prosti (deanery) in the Diocese of Hamar. The red, brick church was built in a long church design in 1882 using plans drawn up by the architect Henrik Thrap-Meyer. The church seats about 650 people.

== History ==
The earliest existing historical records of the church date back to the 14th century, but the church was not new at that time. The first church in Lillehammer was a wooden stave church that was likely built during the 13th century. The church site was at the intersection between two old roads: Kongeveien and the road from the ferry over the river. A market was held on the land between the farm and the church. The old stave church was a modest building that was an annex church to the main Fåberg Church. Not much is known about the church, except that it had a tower. During the 1600s, the church was repaired due to rot and decay in the structure. The church was sold by the King at the Norwegian church auction in the 1720s to raise money to pay down war debts from the Great Northern War. The church was purchased by the people of the parish. Soon after, the people of the parish decided that the old church needed to be replaced.

In 1733, the old church was torn down and replaced with a new timber-framed cruciform building that was built about 20 metres (66 ft) northeast of the site of the old stave church, in the corner of the old cemetery. Svend Tråseth was the lead builder of the church. Some furniture items of varying ages was moved from the old stave church to the new church. This includes, among other things, the altarpiece from 1695 (which was also used in the next church as well and which can be seen today in the Garmo Stave Church at Maihaugen. The new church was consecrated by Bishop Peder Hersleb on 9 January 1733. The new church building was said to have been very similar to the existing Fåberg Church, which was built a few years earlier, but this church had a central tower while Fåberg has a west tower (see painting of the old church). It is said that this church suffered great damage when it was used as a granary in the years of distress and famine before 1814. However, the building was restored afterwards. The town of Lillehammer was established in 1827, and the church was eventually considered too small and outdated and demand for a new church arose.

By the 1870s, planning was underway for a new, much larger church for the growing town of Lillehammer. A new brick long church was built alongside the old church in 1881–1882, roughly on the same site as the old stave church which was torn down in 1733. The new building was constructed in a neo-Gothic style and it was designed by the architect Henrik Thrap-Meyer. The new building was consecrated on 14 June 1882.

In 1959, the church was extensively renovated. Prior to this time, the church had a neo-Gothic style, but afterwards, almost the entire interior of the church was changed. The church's original altarpiece, a copy of Adolph Tidemand's altarpiece at Tyristrand church, was then replaced with a new, painted wooden relief by Maja Refsum with the motif of Jesus in Gethsemane. Also at this time, the exterior doors of the church were replaced. The church's interior was redone again in 2007. A new altar table was installed on a platform at the front of the nave, while the choir appeared as a separate chapel. The choir's walls were dressed with monotypes by Borgny Farstad Svalastog. Also in 2007, the church was re-roofed and the old slate roof was replaced with a new one except for the tower where the slate plates were removed and copper plates were laid.

== Statues ==
There is a statue a few stone throws from the church at Lillehammer made by Rolf Lunde. A replica has later been cast and today stands outside the National Gallery in Oslo. On the church ramp northwest of the church, in the summer of 1937, the statue of Dyre Vaa was unveiled by Lars Skrefsrud (1840-1910). Pentecost 2011, Svein-Tore Kleppan's bronze bust by organist and composer Leif Solberg was unveiled by county mayor Audun Tron. The monument has been given a beautiful and dignified place northwest of the church's main entrance.

== Media gallery ==
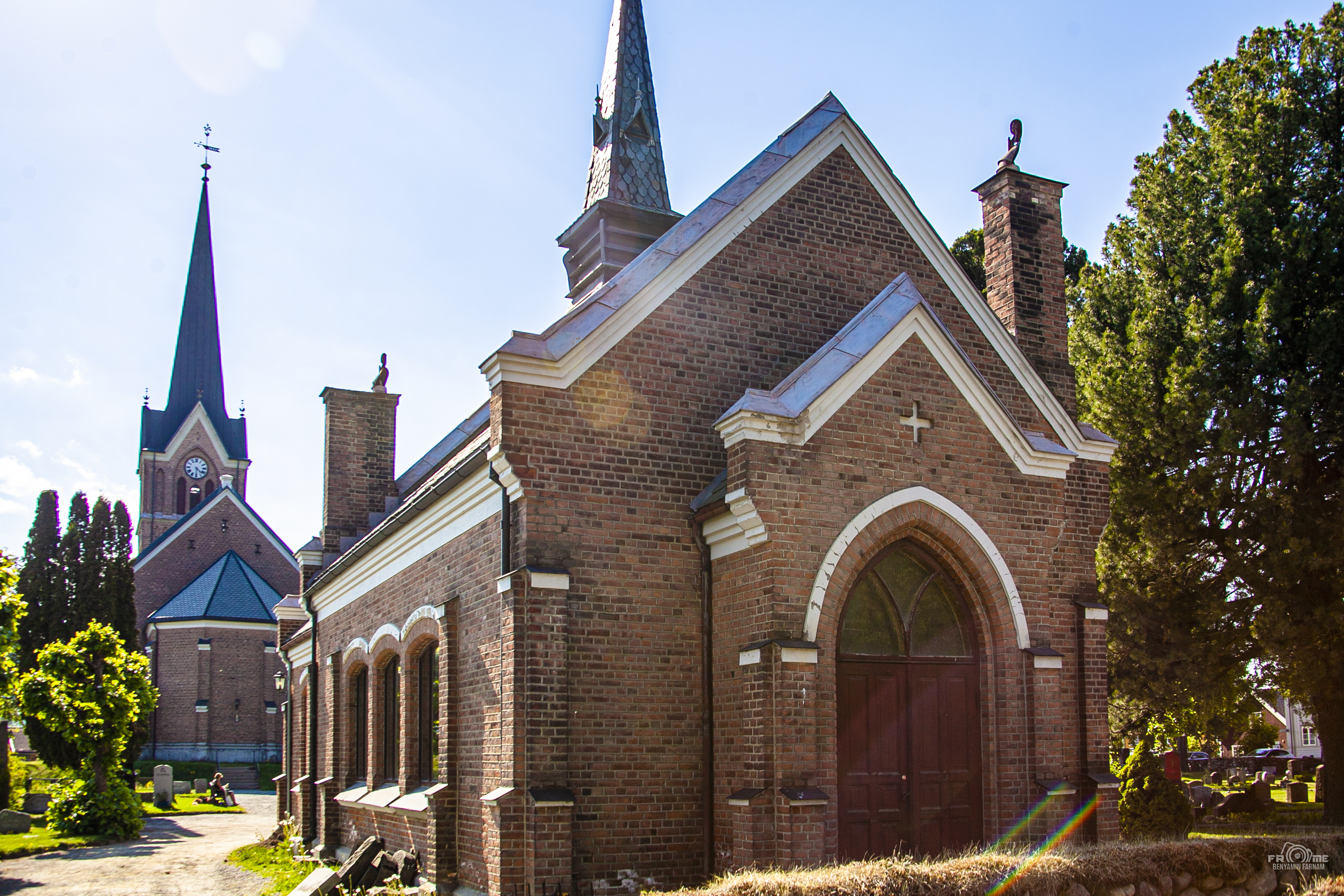

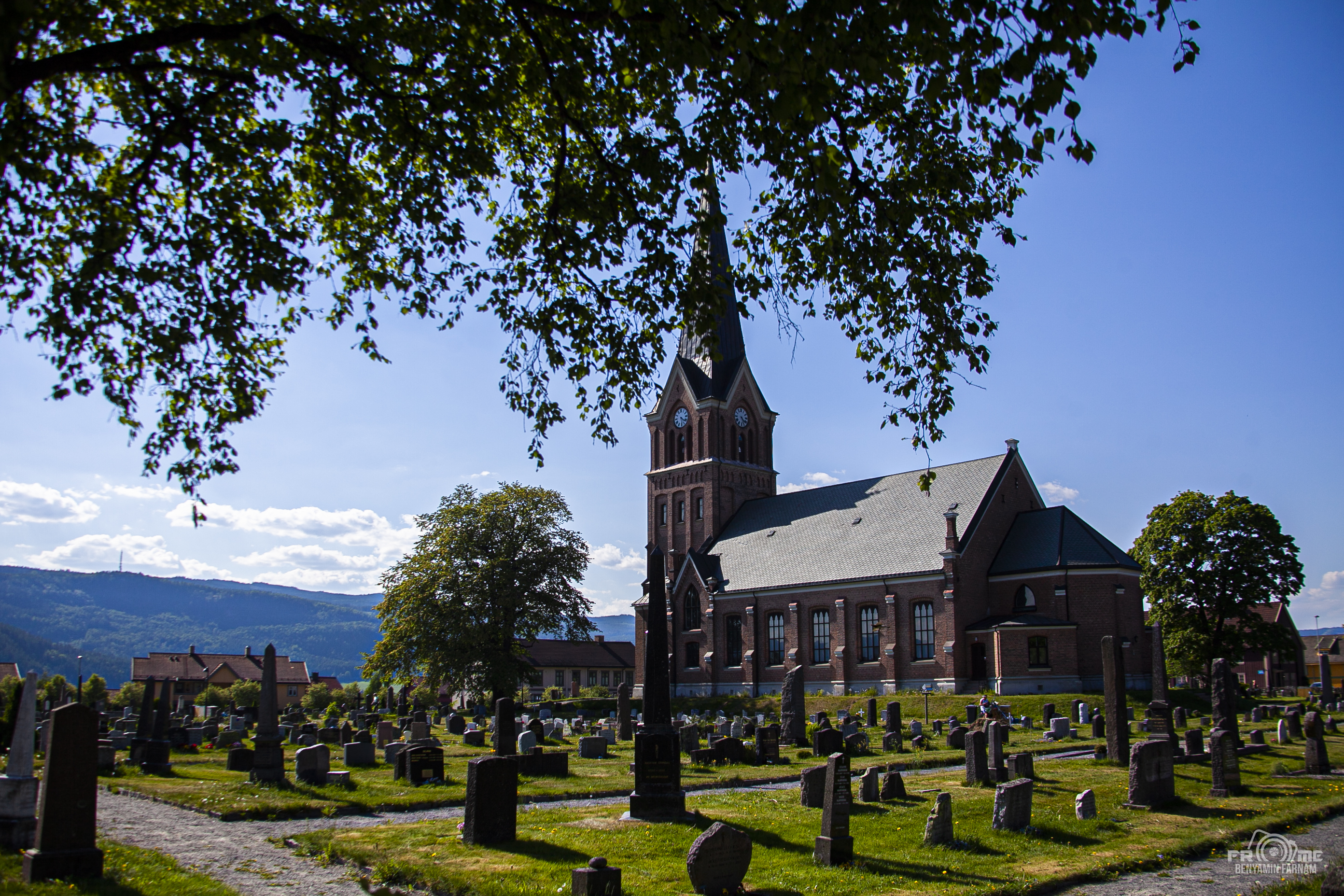

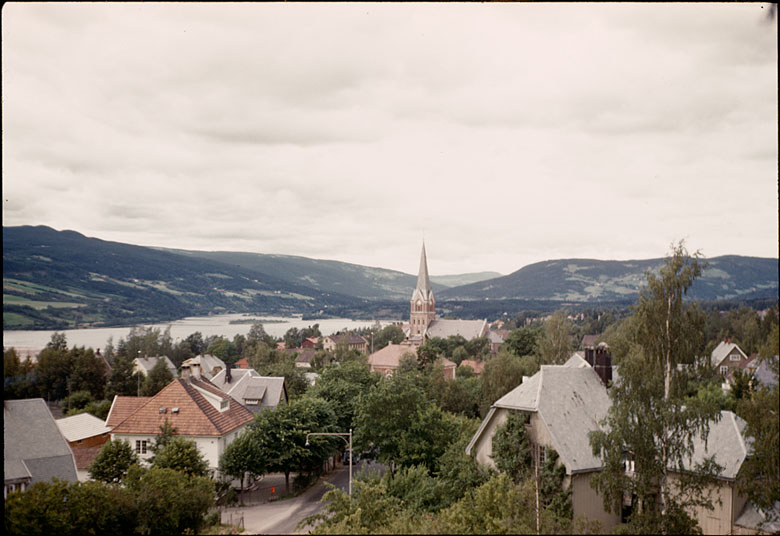

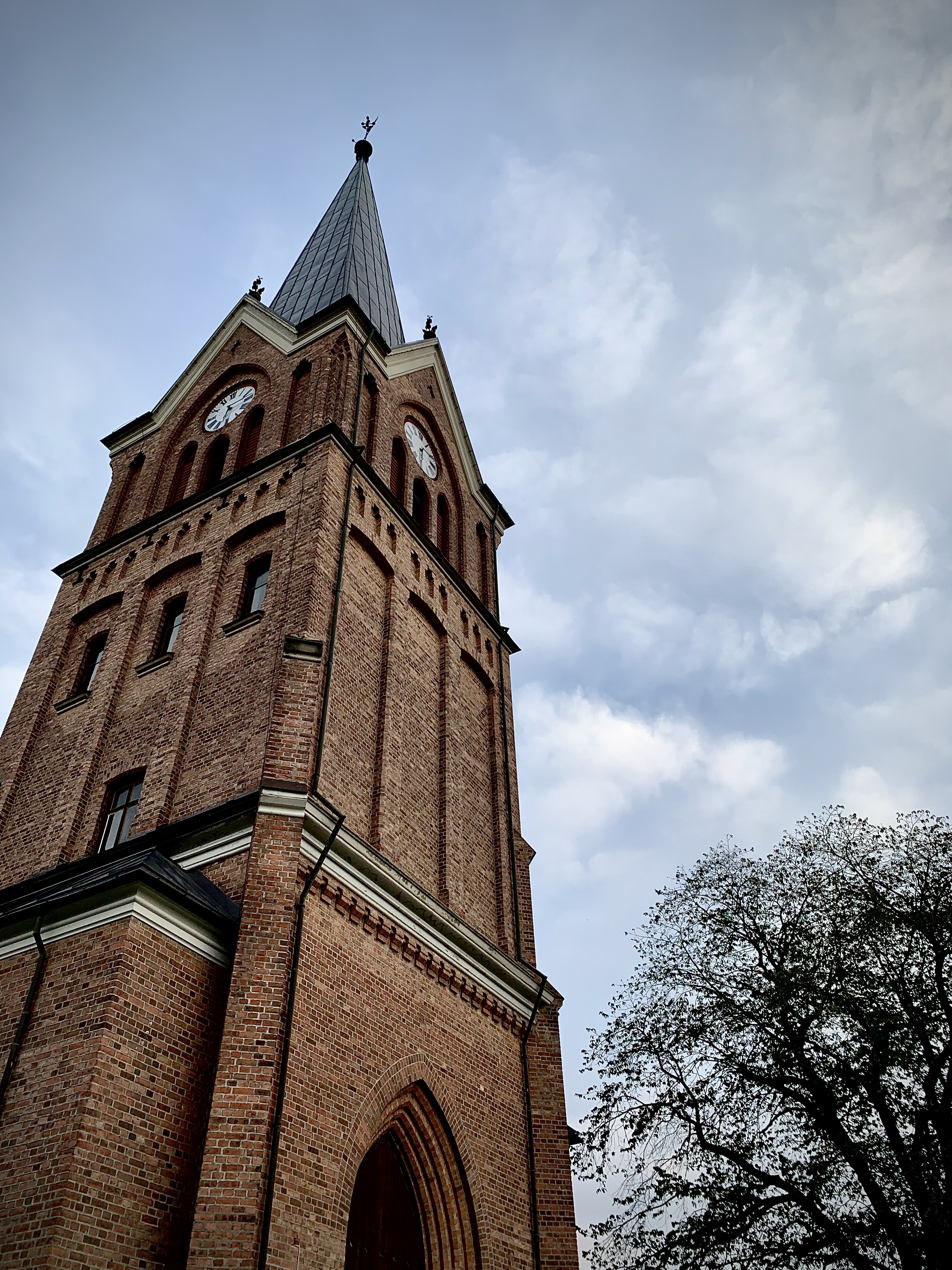

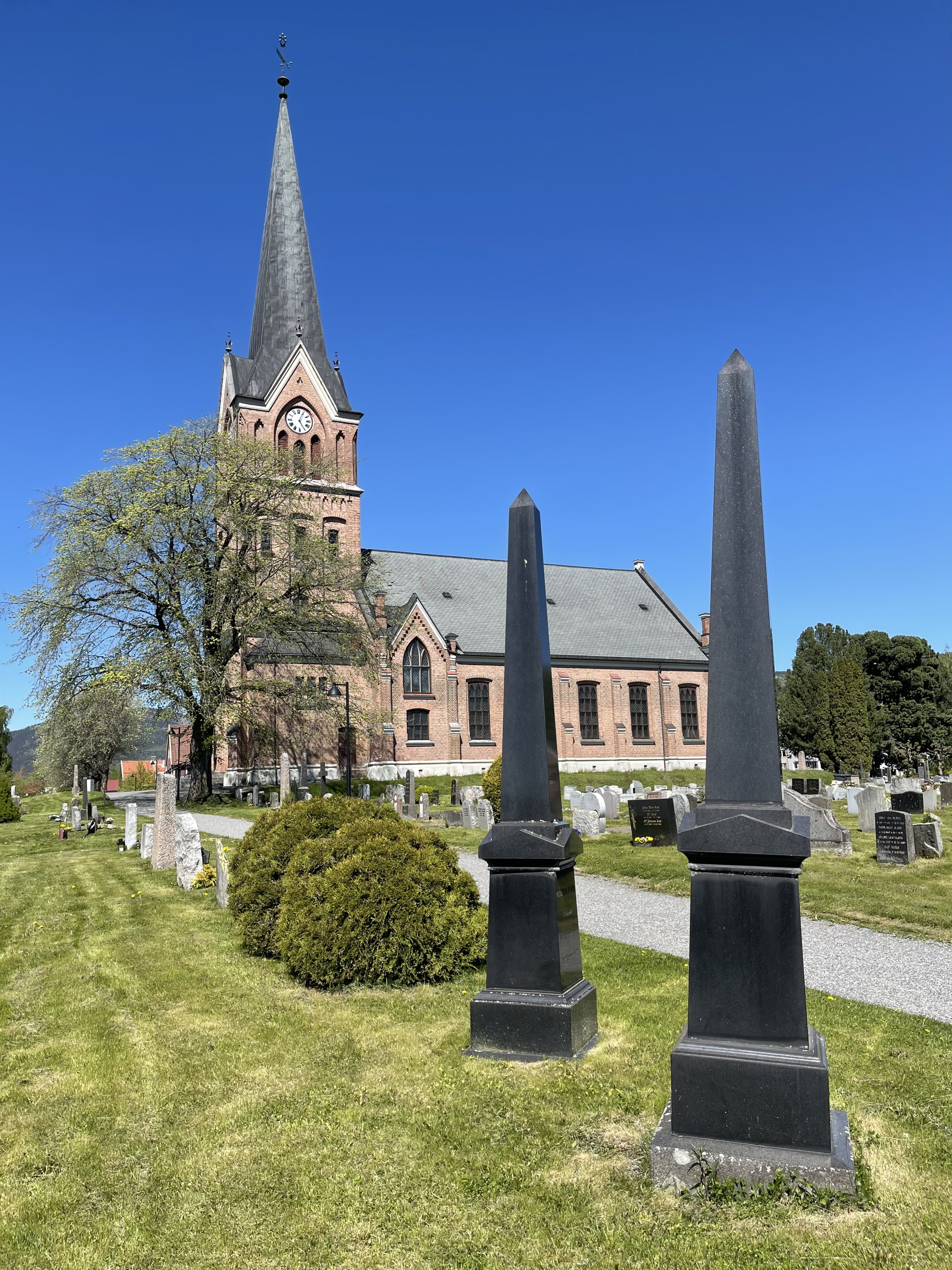

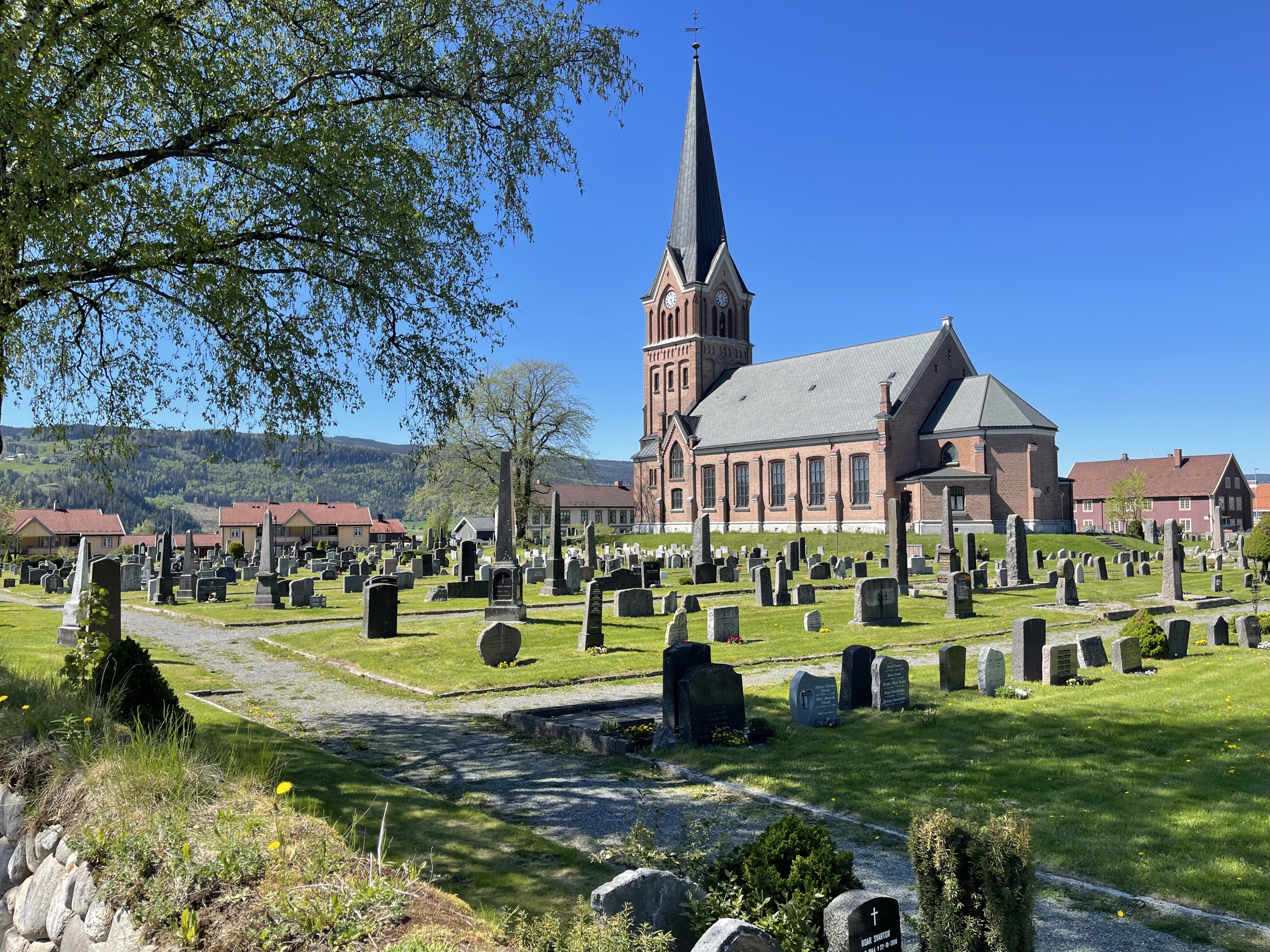

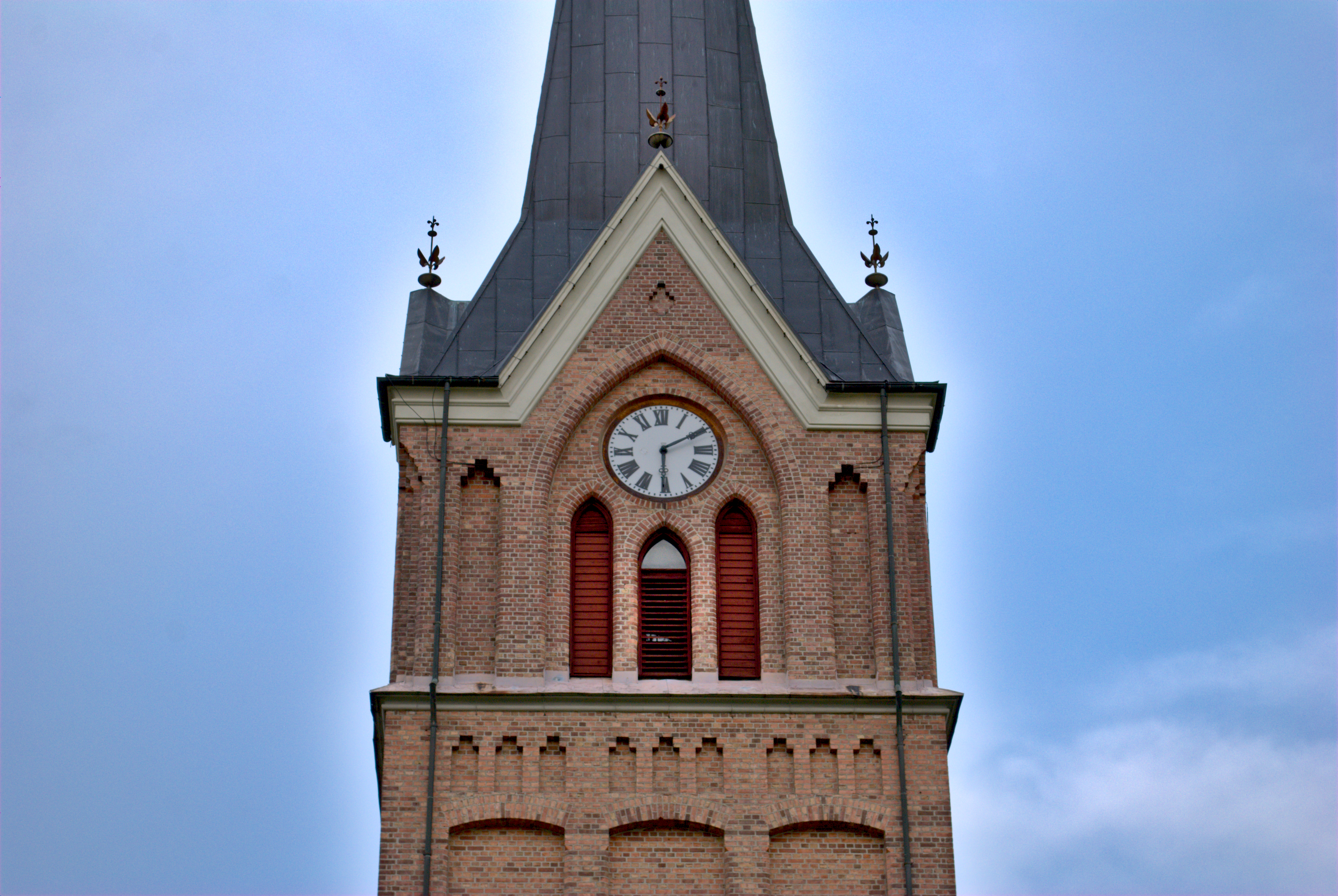

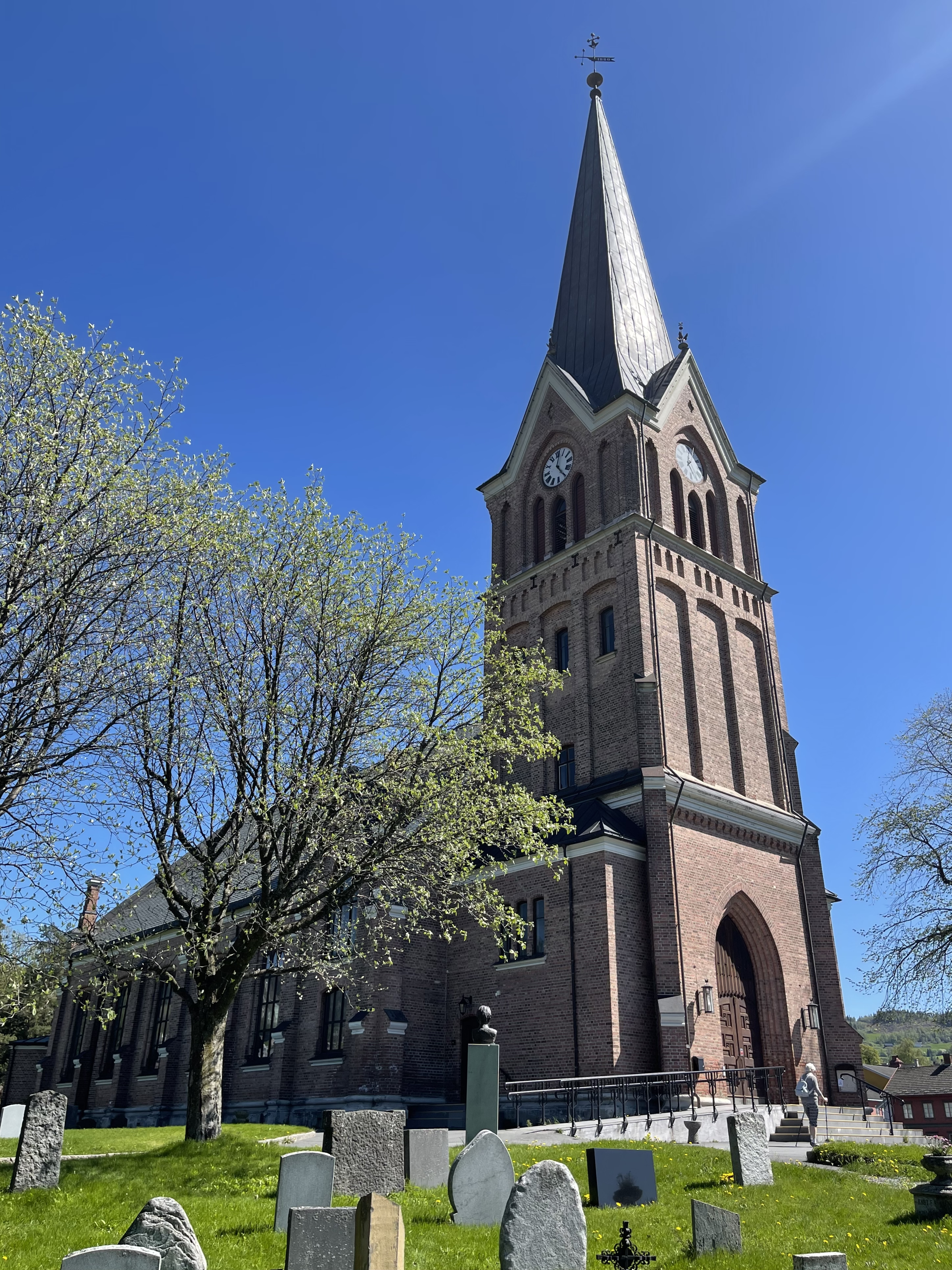

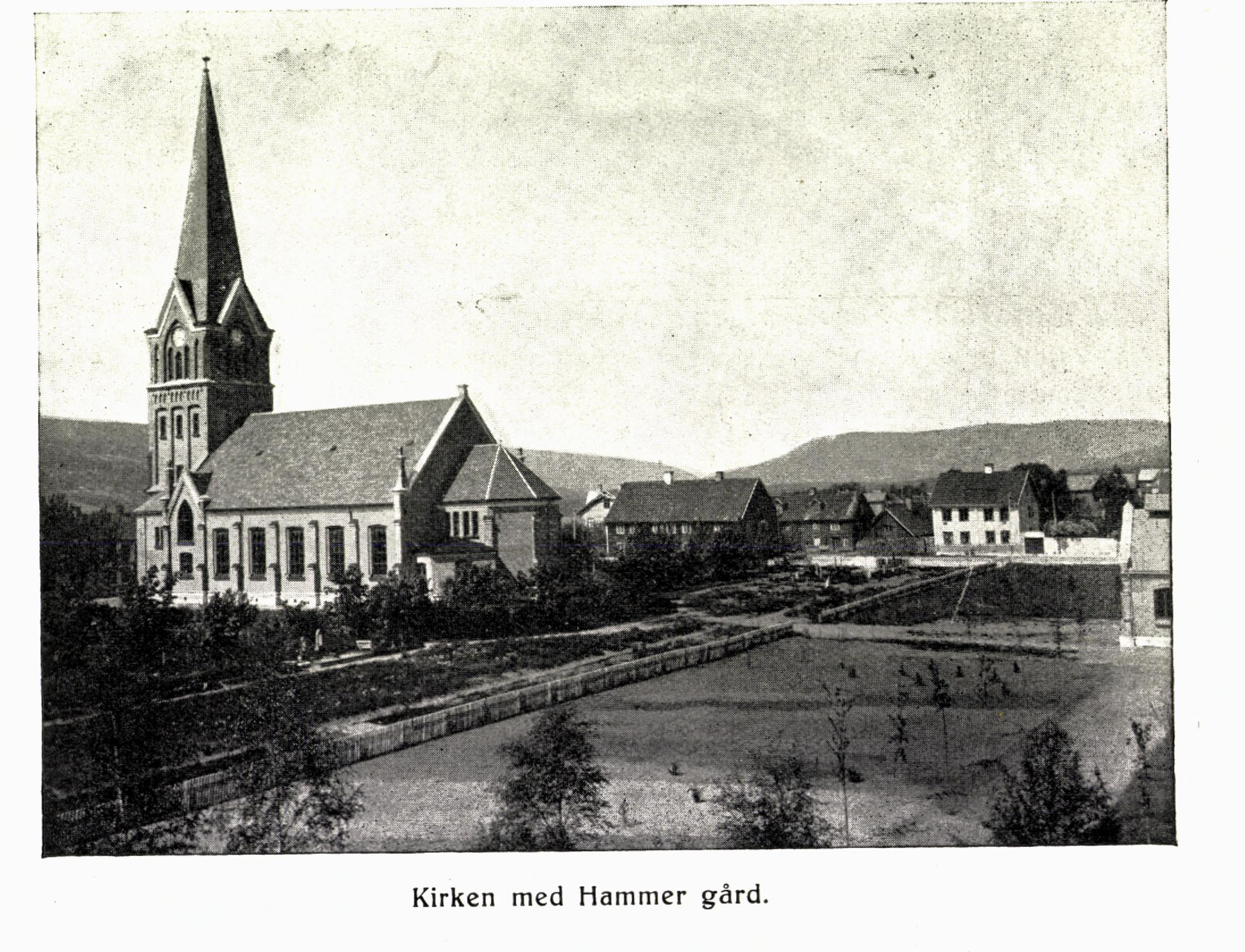

== See also ==
- List of churches in Hamar
