= Oppa =

Oppa may refer to:

- Oppas, 8th-century Visigothic elite
- Oppa, German name of the Opava (river)
- Korean term for older men, see Korean honorifics
