= Lillehammer =

Municipality in Innlandet, Norway

Lillehammer Municipality Lillehammer kommune
- Municipality
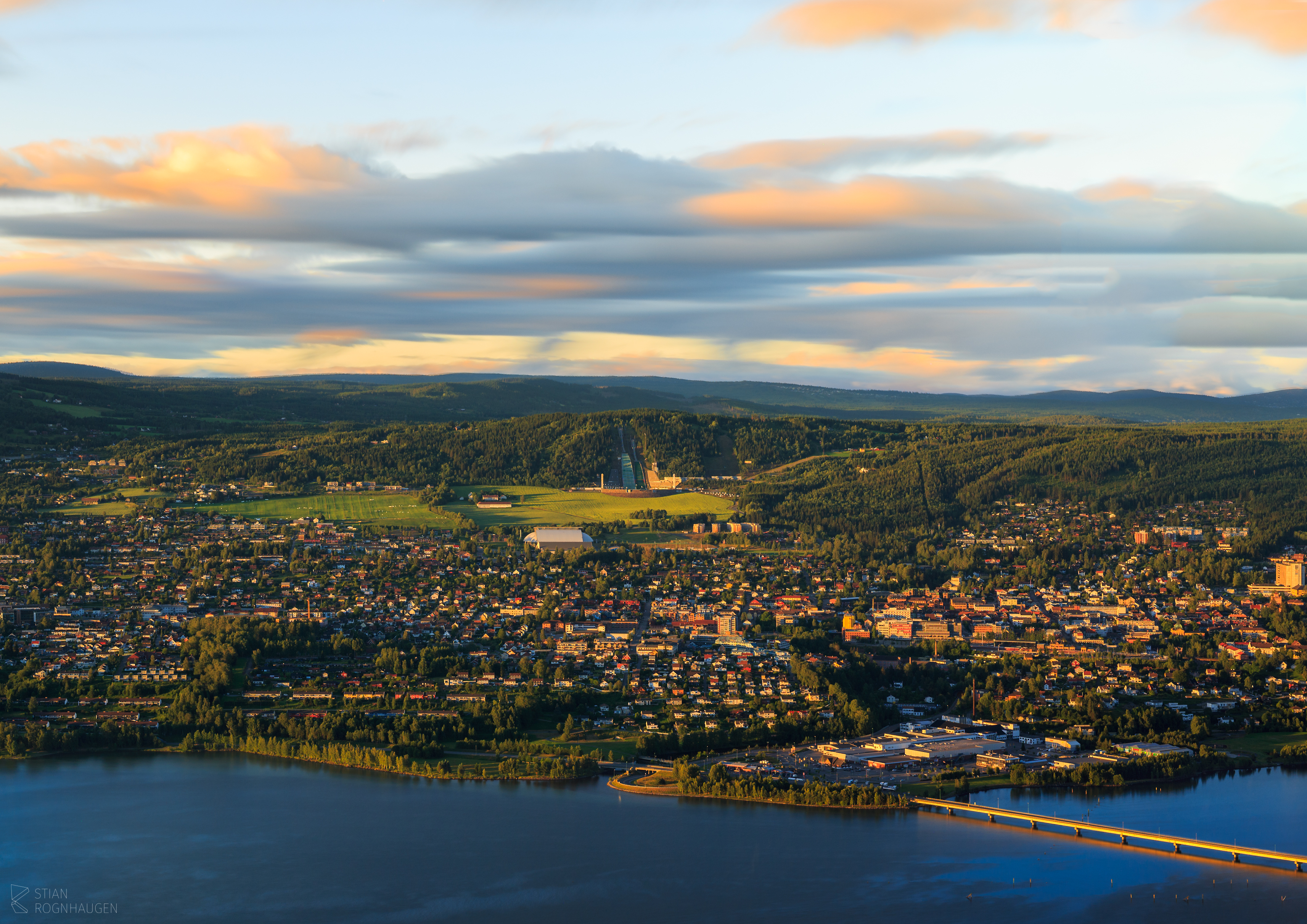
- View of the town of Lillehammer

- Coat of arms

- Innlandet within Norway

- Lillehammer within Innlandet
- Coordinates: 61°7′N 10°28′E
- Country: Norway
- County: Innlandet
- District: Gudbrandsdal
- Established: 1 Jan 1838
  - Created as: Formannskapsdistrikt
- Administrative centre: Lillehammer

Government
  - Mayor (2023): Hans Olav Sundfør (H)

Area
  - Total: 477.94 km^{2} (184.53 sq mi)
  - Land: 450.72 km^{2} (174.02 sq mi)
  - Water: 27.22 km^{2} (10.51 sq mi) 5.7%
  - Rank: #210 in Norway
- Highest elevation: 1,090.63 m (3,578.2 ft)

Population (2025)
  - Total: 29,011
  - Rank: #39 in Norway
  - Density: 60.7/km^{2} (157/sq mi)
  - Change (10 years): ▲ +6.4%
- Demonym: Lillehamring

Official language
  - Norwegian form: Bokmål
- Time zone: UTC+01:00 (CET)
  - Summer (DST): UTC+02:00 (CEST)
- ISO 3166 code: NO-3405
- Website: Official website

Lillehammer (Norwegian pronunciation: [ˈlɪ̂lːəˌhɑmːər]) is a municipality in Innlandet, Norway. It is located in the traditional district of Gudbrandsdal. The administrative centre of the municipality is the town of Lillehammer. The town of Lillehammer was first created in 1827 as a part of Fåberg parish, and later became a municipality that merged with the much bigger Fåberg Municipality in 1964. Some of the more notable villages in the municipality include Fåberg, Hunderfossen, Jørstadmoen and Rudsbygd within the rural area of Fåberg. Vingnes, Saksumdal and Vingrom is located in the western and southern parts. The mountainous parts of the municipality consists of Fåberg Vestfjell, and Fåberg Østfjell, Nordseter.

The 478-square-kilometre (185 sq mi) municipality is the 210th largest by area out of the 357 municipalities in Norway. Lillehammer Municipality is the 39th most populous municipality in Norway with a population of 29,011. The municipality's population density is 60.7 inhabitants per square kilometre (157/sq mi) and its population has increased by 6.4% over the previous 10-year period.

The town of Lillehammer is the largest urban centre in the municipality. It lies in the central part of the municipality and it is surrounded by more rural areas. The town centre is a late nineteenth-century concentration of wooden houses, which enjoys a picturesque location overlooking the northern part of lake Mjøsa and the river Lågen, surrounded by mountains.

Lillehammer hosted the 1994 Winter Olympics, 2004 Junior Eurovision Song Contest, 2004 European Taekwondo Championships and 2016 Winter Youth Olympics.

== General information ==
The municipality was established on 1 January 1838 (see formannskapsdistrikt law). Initially, the municipality only included the town of Lillehammer. On 1 January 1906, a small adjacent area of the neighboring Fåberg Municipality (population: 140) was annexed by Lillehammer Municipality to make room for more expansion as the town grew. During the 1960s, there were many municipal mergers across Norway due to the work of the Schei Committee. On 1 January 1964, the town of Lillehammer (population: 5,905) was merged with Fåberg Municipality (population: 13,381) to form a new, much larger Lillehammer Municipality.

Historically, the municipality was part of the old Oppland county. On 1 January 2020, the municipality became a part of the newly-formed Innlandet county (after Hedmark and Oppland counties were merged).

=== Name ===
The municipality (originally the parish) is named after the old Hamar farm (Old Norse: Hamarr) since the first Lillehammer Church was built there. The name is identical with the word hamarr which means "stone" or "rocky hill". To distinguish it from the nearby town of Hamar and Diocese of Hamar, it began to be called "little Hamar": Lilþlæ Hamar and Litlihamarr, and finally Lillehammer. It is also mentioned in the Old Norse sagas as Litlikaupangr ("Little Trading Place").

=== Coat of arms ===
The coat of arms was granted on 4 April 1898. The arms have are divided with a diagonal line. The field (background) above the line has a tincture of blue. Below the line, the field has a tincture of argent which means it is commonly colored white, but if it is made out of metal, then silver is used. The charge is a birkebeiner, carrying a spear and a shield, who is skiing down the mountainside under a blue sky. The design symbolizes the historical importance of when the Birkebeiners carried the future King Haakon from Lillehammer to Rena on skis. There is a mural crown above the escutcheon. The arms were designed by Andreas Bloch.

=== Churches ===
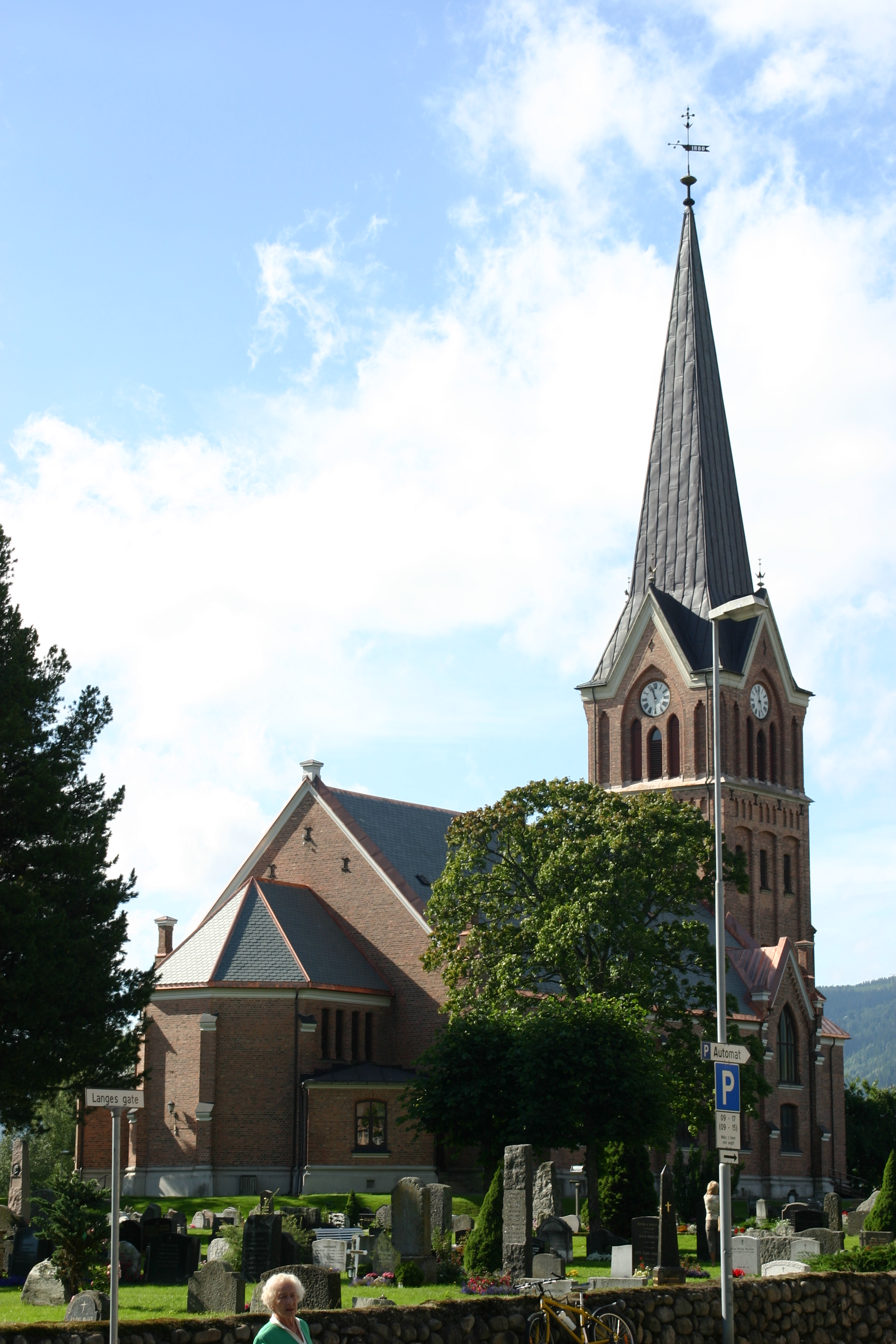
Lillehammer Church

The Church of Norway has six parishes (sokn) within Lillehammer Municipality. It is part of the Sør-Gudbrandsdal prosti (deanery) in the Diocese of Hamar.

Churches in Lillehammer Municipality
| Parish (sokn) | Church name | Location of the church | Year built |
|---|---|---|---|
| Fåberg | Fåberg Church | Fåberg | 1727 |
| Lillehammer | Lillehammer Church | Lillehammer | 1882 |
| Nordre Ål | Nordre Ål Church | Lillehammer | 1994 |
| Nordre Ål | Nordseter Church | Nordseter | 1964 |
| Saksumdal | Saksumdal Church | Lillehammer | 1875 |
| Søre Ål | Søre Ål Church | Lillehammer | 1964 |
| Vingrom | Vingrom Church | Vingrom | 1908 |

== History ==
The town of Lillehammer is located at the northern end of Norway's largest lake, Mjøsa. There have likely been settlements here since the Iron Age and the market here was mentioned in Håkon Håkonson's saga in 1390. It is also mentioned as a site for Thing assembly in 1390. Tradition states that it was here in Lillehammer where the birkebeiners Torstein Skjevla and Skjervald Skrukka joined up with the King's son (and future King), Haakon, in 1205 before they traveled to Østerdalen (an event which is commemorated in March every year to this day). Since medieval times, the Lillehammer Church has been located here.

The town was granted market town rights on 7 August 1827 as a kjøpstad. At that time, 50 people lived within the boundaries of the newly established town. This site was chosen because there were no other towns in all of Christians amt (county) and this site was located along the Gudbrandsdalslågen river and the whole Gudbrandsdal valley was a major transportation route from the capital to northern Norway. Within two years of the establishment of the town, the population had risen to 360 people. The merchant Ludvig Wiese has been counted as the founder of the town (a statue of him was erected in the town in connection with the town's 100th anniversary in 1927). The laying of the main railway line from the capital in Christiania to Eidsvoll was completed in 1852. This railway line was connected with steamships along the lake Mjøsa which travelled to Lillehammer and from there a newly laid road made connections further up into the Gudbrandsdalen valley. This transport system made the transit of timber and agricultural goods from all over the county to the capital possible, and it contributed to the growth of the town of Lillehammer.

In 1973, Mossad killed a Moroccan waiter, having mistaken him for Palestinian terrorist Ali Hassan Salameh, which became known as the Lillehammer affair.

Lillehammer is known as a typical venue for winter sporting events; it was host city of the 1994 Winter Olympics, and the 2016 Winter Youth Olympics, and was part of a joint bid with applicant host city Oslo to host events part of the 2022 Winter Olympics until Oslo withdrew its bid on 1 October 2014.

Lillehammer is home to the largest literature festival in the Nordic countries and, in 2017, was designated as a UNESCO City of Literature.

== Education ==
A number of schools are located in Lillehammer, including the Hammartun Primary and Lower Secondary School, Søre Ål Primary School and Kringsjå Primary and Lower Secondary School. Lillehammer Upper Secondary School consists of two branches, North and South, both situated near the city center. The private high school Norwegian College of Elite Sports, NTG, also has a branch in Lillehammer. The Lillehammer campus of Inland Norway University of Applied Sciences is situated just north of the town itself.

Lillehammer is also the home of the Nansen Academy - the Norwegian Humanistic Academy. The Nansen Academy is an educational institution for adult students with varied political, religious, and cultural backgrounds. The Academy was founded on the core principles of humanism and aims at strengthening the knowledge of these principles.

The 14th World Scout Jamboree was held from 29 July to 7 August 1975 and was hosted by Norway at Lillehammer.

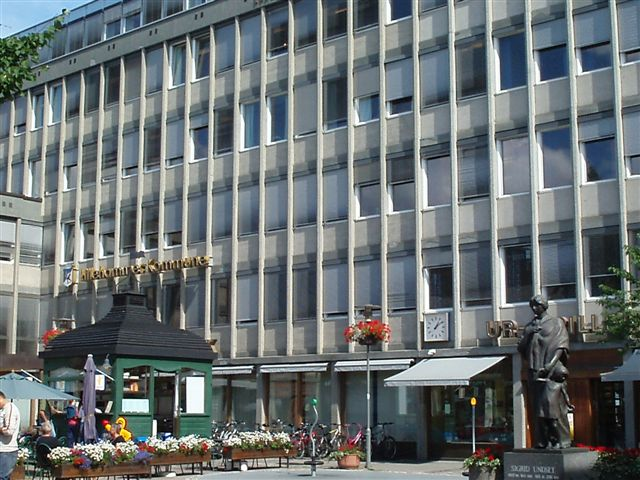
The municipal hall

== Government ==
Lillehammer Municipality is responsible for primary education (through 10th grade), outpatient health services, senior citizen services, welfare and other social services, zoning, economic development, and municipal roads and utilities. The municipality is governed by a municipal council of directly elected representatives. The mayor is indirectly elected by a vote of the municipal council. The municipality is under the jurisdiction of the Gudbrandsdal District Court and the Eidsivating Court of Appeal.

=== Municipal council ===
The municipal council (Kommunestyre) of Lillehammer Municipality is made up of 39 representatives who are elected to four year terms. The tables below show the current and historical composition of the council by political party.

Lillehammer kommunestyre 2023–2027
| Party name (in Norwegian) | Number of representatives |
|---|---|
| Labour Party (Arbeiderpartiet) | 12 |
| Progress Party (Fremskrittspartiet) | 2 |
| Green Party (Miljøpartiet De Grønne) | 2 |
| Conservative Party (Høyre) | 10 |
| Industry and Business Party (Industri‑ og Næringspartiet) | 1 |
| Christian Democratic Party (Kristelig Folkeparti) | 1 |
| Pensioners' Party (Pensjonistpartiet) | 2 |
| Red Party (Rødt) | 2 |
| Centre Party (Senterpartiet) | 2 |
| Socialist Left Party (Sosialistisk Venstreparti) | 3 |
| Liberal Party (Venstre) | 2 |
| Total number of members: | 39 |

Lillehammer kommunestyre 2019–2023
| Party name (in Norwegian) | Number of representatives |
|---|---|
| Labour Party (Arbeiderpartiet) | 13 |
| Progress Party (Fremskrittspartiet) | 2 |
| Green Party (Miljøpartiet De Grønne) | 4 |
| Conservative Party (Høyre) | 9 |
| Christian Democratic Party (Kristelig Folkeparti) | 1 |
| Pensioners' Party (Pensjonistpartiet) | 1 |
| Red Party (Rødt) | 3 |
| Centre Party (Senterpartiet) | 8 |
| Socialist Left Party (Sosialistisk Venstreparti) | 4 |
| Liberal Party (Venstre) | 2 |
| Total number of members: | 47 |

Lillehammer kommunestyre 2015–2019
| Party name (in Norwegian) | Number of representatives |
|---|---|
| Labour Party (Arbeiderpartiet) | 22 |
| Progress Party (Fremskrittspartiet) | 2 |
| Green Party (Miljøpartiet De Grønne) | 3 |
| Conservative Party (Høyre) | 7 |
| Christian Democratic Party (Kristelig Folkeparti) | 2 |
| Red Party (Rødt) | 1 |
| Centre Party (Senterpartiet) | 4 |
| Socialist Left Party (Sosialistisk Venstreparti) | 2 |
| Liberal Party (Venstre) | 4 |
| Total number of members: | 47 |

Lillehammer kommunestyre 2011–2015
| Party name (in Norwegian) | Number of representatives |
|---|---|
| Labour Party (Arbeiderpartiet) | 19 |
| Progress Party (Fremskrittspartiet) | 3 |
| Green Party (Miljøpartiet De Grønne) | 1 |
| Conservative Party (Høyre) | 11 |
| Christian Democratic Party (Kristelig Folkeparti) | 2 |
| Red Party (Rødt) | 2 |
| Centre Party (Senterpartiet) | 2 |
| Socialist Left Party (Sosialistisk Venstreparti) | 2 |
| Liberal Party (Venstre) | 5 |
| Total number of members: | 47 |

Lillehammer kommunestyre 2007–2011
| Party name (in Norwegian) | Number of representatives |
|---|---|
| Labour Party (Arbeiderpartiet) | 19 |
| Progress Party (Fremskrittspartiet) | 6 |
| Conservative Party (Høyre) | 5 |
| Christian Democratic Party (Kristelig Folkeparti) | 2 |
| Pensioners' Party (Pensjonistpartiet) | 1 |
| Red Electoral Alliance (Rød Valgallianse) | 2 |
| Centre Party (Senterpartiet) | 3 |
| Socialist Left Party (Sosialistisk Venstreparti) | 4 |
| Liberal Party (Venstre) | 3 |
| Lillehammer town and local list (Lillehammer by- og bygdeliste) | 2 |
| Total number of members: | 47 |

Lillehammer kommunestyre 2003–2007
| Party name (in Norwegian) | Number of representatives |
|---|---|
| Labour Party (Arbeiderpartiet) | 18 |
| Progress Party (Fremskrittspartiet) | 5 |
| Conservative Party (Høyre) | 6 |
| Christian Democratic Party (Kristelig Folkeparti) | 2 |
| Pensioners' Party (Pensjonistpartiet) | 1 |
| Red Electoral Alliance (Rød Valgallianse) | 1 |
| Centre Party (Senterpartiet) | 4 |
| Socialist Left Party (Sosialistisk Venstreparti) | 7 |
| Liberal Party (Venstre) | 3 |
| Total number of members: | 47 |

Lillehammer kommunestyre 1999–2003
| Party name (in Norwegian) | Number of representatives |
|---|---|
| Labour Party (Arbeiderpartiet) | 17 |
| Progress Party (Fremskrittspartiet) | 3 |
| Conservative Party (Høyre) | 9 |
| Christian Democratic Party (Kristelig Folkeparti) | 3 |
| Pensioners' Party (Pensjonistpartiet) | 1 |
| Red Electoral Alliance (Rød Valgallianse) | 2 |
| Centre Party (Senterpartiet) | 4 |
| Socialist Left Party (Sosialistisk Venstreparti) | 5 |
| Liberal Party (Venstre) | 3 |
| Total number of members: | 47 |

Lillehammer kommunestyre 1995–1999
| Party name (in Norwegian) | Number of representatives |
|---|---|
| Labour Party (Arbeiderpartiet) | 22 |
| Conservative Party (Høyre) | 10 |
| Christian Democratic Party (Kristelig Folkeparti) | 2 |
| Pensioners' Party (Pensjonistpartiet) | 1 |
| Red Electoral Alliance (Rød Valgallianse) | 1 |
| Centre Party (Senterpartiet) | 5 |
| Socialist Left Party (Sosialistisk Venstreparti) | 4 |
| Liberal Party (Venstre) | 2 |
| Total number of members: | 47 |

Lillehammer kommunestyre 1991–1995
| Party name (in Norwegian) | Number of representatives |
|---|---|
| Labour Party (Arbeiderpartiet) | 22 |
| Progress Party (Fremskrittspartiet) | 2 |
| Conservative Party (Høyre) | 10 |
| Christian Democratic Party (Kristelig Folkeparti) | 2 |
| Pensioners' Party (Pensjonistpartiet) | 1 |
| Red Electoral Alliance (Rød Valgallianse) | 1 |
| Centre Party (Senterpartiet) | 7 |
| Socialist Left Party (Sosialistisk Venstreparti) | 8 |
| Liberal Party (Venstre) | 2 |
| Total number of members: | 55 |

Lillehammer kommunestyre 1987–1991
| Party name (in Norwegian) | Number of representatives |
|---|---|
| Labour Party (Arbeiderpartiet) | 26 |
| Progress Party (Fremskrittspartiet) | 5 |
| Conservative Party (Høyre) | 12 |
| Christian Democratic Party (Kristelig Folkeparti) | 2 |
| Centre Party (Senterpartiet) | 4 |
| Socialist Left Party (Sosialistisk Venstreparti) | 4 |
| Liberal Party (Venstre) | 2 |
| Total number of members: | 55 |

Lillehammer kommunestyre 1983–1987
| Party name (in Norwegian) | Number of representatives |
|---|---|
| Labour Party (Arbeiderpartiet) | 27 |
| Progress Party (Fremskrittspartiet) | 1 |
| Conservative Party (Høyre) | 14 |
| Christian Democratic Party (Kristelig Folkeparti) | 3 |
| Centre Party (Senterpartiet) | 4 |
| Socialist Left Party (Sosialistisk Venstreparti) | 4 |
| Liberal Party (Venstre) | 2 |
| Total number of members: | 55 |

Lillehammer kommunestyre 1979–1983
| Party name (in Norwegian) | Number of representatives |
|---|---|
| Labour Party (Arbeiderpartiet) | 24 |
| Conservative Party (Høyre) | 15 |
| Christian Democratic Party (Kristelig Folkeparti) | 4 |
| Centre Party (Senterpartiet) | 5 |
| Socialist Left Party (Sosialistisk Venstreparti) | 4 |
| Liberal Party (Venstre) | 3 |
| Total number of members: | 55 |

Lillehammer kommunestyre 1975–1979
| Party name (in Norwegian) | Number of representatives |
|---|---|
| Labour Party (Arbeiderpartiet) | 27 |
| Conservative Party (Høyre) | 11 |
| Christian Democratic Party (Kristelig Folkeparti) | 5 |
| New People's Party (Nye Folkepartiet) | 1 |
| Centre Party (Senterpartiet) | 6 |
| Socialist Left Party (Sosialistisk Venstreparti) | 4 |
| Liberal Party (Venstre) | 1 |
| Total number of members: | 55 |

Lillehammer kommunestyre 1971–1975
| Party name (in Norwegian) | Number of representatives |
|---|---|
| Labour Party (Arbeiderpartiet) | 27 |
| Conservative Party (Høyre) | 10 |
| Christian Democratic Party (Kristelig Folkeparti) | 4 |
| Centre Party (Senterpartiet) | 7 |
| Liberal Party (Venstre) | 2 |
| Socialist common list (Venstresosialistiske felleslister) | 5 |
| Total number of members: | 55 |

Lillehammer kommunestyre 1967–1971
| Party name (in Norwegian) | Number of representatives |
|---|---|
| Labour Party (Arbeiderpartiet) | 29 |
| Conservative Party (Høyre) | 11 |
| Christian Democratic Party (Kristelig Folkeparti) | 3 |
| Centre Party (Senterpartiet) | 6 |
| Socialist People's Party (Sosialistisk Folkeparti) | 3 |
| Liberal Party (Venstre) | 3 |
| Total number of members: | 55 |

Lillehammer kommunestyre 1963–1967
| Party name (in Norwegian) | Number of representatives |
|---|---|
| Labour Party (Arbeiderpartiet) | 30 |
| Conservative Party (Høyre) | 11 |
| Communist Party (Kommunistiske Parti) | 1 |
| Christian Democratic Party (Kristelig Folkeparti) | 3 |
| Centre Party (Senterpartiet) | 5 |
| Socialist People's Party (Sosialistisk Folkeparti) | 2 |
| Liberal Party (Venstre) | 3 |
| Total number of members: | 55 |

Lillehammer bystyre 1959–1963
| Party name (in Norwegian) | Number of representatives |
|---|---|
| Labour Party (Arbeiderpartiet) | 20 |
| Conservative Party (Høyre) | 12 |
| Communist Party (Kommunistiske Parti) | 1 |
| Christian Democratic Party (Kristelig Folkeparti) | 2 |
| Liberal Party (Venstre) | 2 |
| Total number of members: | 37 |

Lillehammer bystyre 1955–1959
| Party name (in Norwegian) | Number of representatives |
|---|---|
| Labour Party (Arbeiderpartiet) | 19 |
| Conservative Party (Høyre) | 11 |
| Communist Party (Kommunistiske Parti) | 2 |
| Christian Democratic Party (Kristelig Folkeparti) | 2 |
| Liberal Party (Venstre) | 3 |
| Total number of members: | 37 |

Lillehammer bystyre 1951–1955
| Party name (in Norwegian) | Number of representatives |
|---|---|
| Labour Party (Arbeiderpartiet) | 17 |
| Conservative Party (Høyre) | 10 |
| Communist Party (Kommunistiske Parti) | 3 |
| Christian Democratic Party (Kristelig Folkeparti) | 3 |
| Liberal Party (Venstre) | 3 |
| Total number of members: | 36 |

Lillehammer bystyre 1947–1951
| Party name (in Norwegian) | Number of representatives |
|---|---|
| Labour Party (Arbeiderpartiet) | 17 |
| Conservative Party (Høyre) | 9 |
| Communist Party (Kommunistiske Parti) | 4 |
| Christian Democratic Party (Kristelig Folkeparti) | 3 |
| Joint list of the Liberal Party (Venstre) and the Radical People's Party (Radikale Folkepartiet) | 3 |
| Total number of members: | 36 |

Lillehammer bystyre 1945–1947
| Party name (in Norwegian) | Number of representatives |
|---|---|
| Labour Party (Arbeiderpartiet) | 16 |
| Conservative Party (Høyre) | 8 |
| Communist Party (Kommunistiske Parti) | 5 |
| Christian Democratic Party (Kristelig Folkeparti) | 3 |
| Joint list of the Liberal Party (Venstre) and the Radical People's Party (Radikale Folkepartiet) | 4 |
| Total number of members: | 36 |

Lillehammer bystyre 1937–1940*
| Party name (in Norwegian) | Number of representatives |
|---|---|
| Labour Party (Arbeiderpartiet) | 16 |
| Joint List(s) of Non-Socialist Parties (Borgerlige Felleslister) | 13 |
| Local List(s) (Lokale lister) | 7 |
| Total number of members: | 36 |
Note: Due to the German occupation of Norway during World War II, no elections were held for new municipal councils until after the war ended in 1945.

Lillehammer bystyre 1934–1937
| Party name (in Norwegian) | Number of representatives |
|---|---|
| Labour Party (Arbeiderpartiet) | 15 |
| Joint List(s) of Non-Socialist Parties (Borgerlige Felleslister) | 16 |
| Local List(s) (Lokale lister) | 5 |
| Total number of members: | 36 |

Lillehammer bystyre 1931–1934
| Party name (in Norwegian) | Number of representatives |
|---|---|
| Labour Party (Arbeiderpartiet) | 13 |
| Communist Party (Kommunistiske Parti) | 1 |
| Joint List(s) of Non-Socialist Parties (Borgerlige Felleslister) | 18 |
| Local List(s) (Lokale lister) | 4 |
| Total number of members: | 36 |

Lillehammer bystyre 1928–1931
| Party name (in Norwegian) | Number of representatives |
|---|---|
| Labour Party (Arbeiderpartiet) | 15 |
| Free-minded Liberal Party (Frisinnede Venstre) | 4 |
| Communist Party (Kommunistiske Parti) | 1 |
| Liberal Party (Venstre) | 2 |
| Joint List(s) of Non-Socialist Parties (Borgerlige Felleslister) | 14 |
| Total number of members: | 36 |

Lillehammer bystyre 1925–1928
| Party name (in Norwegian) | Number of representatives |
|---|---|
| Labour Party (Arbeiderpartiet) | 8 |
| Communist Party (Kommunistiske Parti) | 2 |
| Social Democratic Labour Party (Socialdemokratiske Arbeiderparti) | 3 |
| Joint list of the Conservative Party (Høyre) and the Free-minded Liberal Party (Frisinnede Venstre) | 19 |
| Local List(s) (Lokale lister) | 4 |
| Total number of members: | 36 |

Lillehammer bystyre 1922–1925
| Party name (in Norwegian) | Number of representatives |
|---|---|
| Labour Party (Arbeiderpartiet) | 10 |
| Social Democratic Labour Party (Socialdemokratiske Arbeiderparti) | 2 |
| Liberal Party (Venstre) | 5 |
| Joint list of the Conservative Party (Høyre) and the Free-minded Liberal Party (Frisinnede Venstre) | 19 |
| Total number of members: | 36 |

Lillehammer bystyre 1919–1922
| Party name (in Norwegian) | Number of representatives |
|---|---|
| Labour Party (Arbeiderpartiet) | 9 |
| Joint list of the Liberal Party and Temperance Party (Venstre og avholdspartiet) | 2 |
| Joint list of the Conservative Party (Høyre) and the Free-minded Liberal Party (Frisinnede Venstre) | 14 |
| Local List(s) (Lokale lister) | 3 |
| Total number of members: | 28 |

=== Mayors ===
The mayor (Norwegian: ordfører) of Lillehammer Municipality is the political leader of the municipality and the chairperson of the municipal council. Here is a list of people who have held this position:

- 1838–1843: Ludvig Wiese
- 1844–1844: Børre Henrik Børresen
- 1845–1845: Knut Torkilsen
- 1846–1846: Christen Andersen
- 1847–1847: Knut Torkilsen
- 1848–1848: Christian Plathe
- 1849–1849: Wilhelm Lorange
- 1850–1851: Hans Jensen Selmer
- 1852–1852: Wilhelm Lorange
- 1853–1853: Ulrik Frederik Lange
- 1854–1854: Wilhelm Lorange
- 1855–1855: Ulrik Frederik Lange
- 1856–1856: Karl Nilsen
- 1857–1857: Jakob Løkke
- 1858–1858: Karl Nilsen
- 1859–1859: Jakob Løkke
- 1860–1860: Wilhelm Lorange
- 1861–1863: Ulrik Frederik Lange
- 1864–1867: Karl Nilsen
- 1868–1868: Jess Severin Horster
- 1869–1871: Nikolai Gunnerius Bøhmer
- 1872–1872: Thorstein Lunde
- 1873–1873: Nikolai Gunnerius Bøhmer
- 1874–1876: O.J. Grundtvig
- 1877–1878: Karl Nilsen
- 1879–1880: Thorstein Lunde
- 1881–1889: Nikolai Gunnerius Bøhmer
- 1890–1892: Thorstein Lunde
- 1893–1895: Ingvald Schey
- 1896–1897: Axel Thallaug
- 1898–1899: E. Olsen-Berg
- 1900–1901: Simen Fougner
- 1902–1902: E. Olsen-Berg
- 1903–1904: Axel Thallaug
- 1905–1907: Ingvald Schey
- 1908–1908: Eiliv Fougner
- 1909–1910: O.A. Larsen
- 1911–1912: Simen Fougner
- 1913–1913: H. Lødrup
- 1914–1916: Simen Fougner
- 1917–1917: Olaf Formoe
- 1918–1918: Thomas Tallaksen
- 1919–1919: Arne Jensen
- 1920–1922: Axel Thallaug (H)
- 1923–1928: Johan Alfred Svendsen
- 1929–1931: Eilif Moe (H)
- 1932–1932: Arne Jensen (H)
- 1938–1940: Olaf Sanne (H)
- 1940–1940: Margit Haslund (H)
- 1941–1941: Peer Widding
- 1943–1943: Johannes Gadens
- 1945–1945: Olaf Sanne (H)
- 1946–1954: Einar Hansen (Ap)
- 1954–1959: Anton Andreassen (Ap)
- 1960–1963: Erling Juell Aune (Ap)
- 1964–1975: Magne Henriksen (Ap)
- 1976–1981: Knut Korsæth (Ap)
- 1982–1987: Arild Bakken (Ap)
- 1987–1999: Audun Tron (Ap)
- 1999–2011: Synnøve Brenden Klemetrud (Ap)
- 2011–2019: Espen Johnsen (Ap)
- 2019–2023: Ingunn Trosholmen (Ap)
- 2023–present: Hans Olav Sundfør (H)

== Geography ==
Lillehammer Municipality is situated in the lower part of the Gudbrandsdal valley, at the northern end of lake Mjøsa. It is located to the south of Øyer Municipality, to the southeast of Gausdal Municipality, northeast of Nordre Land Municipality, to the north of Gjøvik Municipality, and to the southeast of Ringsaker Municipality. The highest point in the municipality is the 1,090.63-metre (3,578.2 ft) tall mountain Nevelfjell in the northeast part of the municipality.

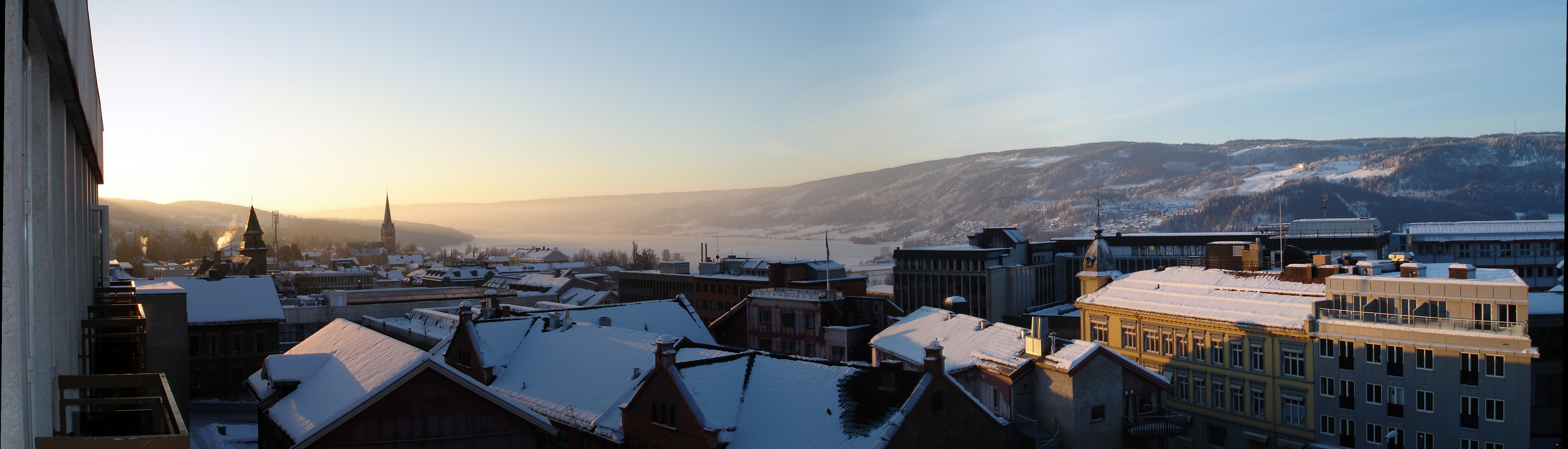
Lillehammer is situated in an inland valley with reliable snow cover in winter

=== Climate ===
Lillehammer has a humid continental climate (Köppen: Dfb) and used to have a subarctic climate (Köppen: Dfc), with the Scandinavian mountain chain to the west and north limiting oceanic influences. The record high of 34 °C (93 °F) was recorded in June 1970. The record low of −31 °C (−24 °F) was recorded in December 1978 and January 1979, and the same low was recorded in January 1987. There has been no overnight air frost in the month of August since 1978 with the record low for that month being −0.6 °C (30.9 °F). The coldest recorded temperature after 2000 is −26.2 °C (−15.2 °F) in January 2010. The average date for the last overnight freeze (low below 0 °C (32.0 °F)) in spring is May 10 and average date for first freeze in autumn is September 30 (1981-2010 average) giving an average frost-free season of 142 days. The current weather station Lillehammer-Sætherengen became operational in 1982; extremes are also from two earlier weather stations in Lillehammer.

Climate data for Lillehammer 1991-2020 (240 m; extremes 1957 - 2018)
| Month | Jan | Feb | Mar | Apr | May | Jun | Jul | Aug | Sep | Oct | Nov | Dec | Year |
|---|---|---|---|---|---|---|---|---|---|---|---|---|---|
| Record high °C (°F) | 10.4 (50.7) | 12.5 (54.5) | 16.0 (60.8) | 23.4 (74.1) | 28.5 (83.3) | 34.0 (93.2) | 32.4 (90.3) | 33.0 (91.4) | 26.4 (79.5) | 19.5 (67.1) | 16.2 (61.2) | 11.3 (52.3) | 34.0 (93.2) |
| Mean daily maximum °C (°F) | −2.9 (26.8) | −1.6 (29.1) | 3.8 (38.8) | 9.5 (49.1) | 15.4 (59.7) | 19.5 (67.1) | 21.9 (71.4) | 19.9 (67.8) | 14.9 (58.8) | 7.3 (45.1) | 1.5 (34.7) | −2.4 (27.7) | 8.9 (48.0) |
| Daily mean °C (°F) | −6.1 (21.0) | −5.4 (22.3) | −1.2 (29.8) | 4 (39) | 9.4 (48.9) | 13.7 (56.7) | 16.1 (61.0) | 14.5 (58.1) | 10.1 (50.2) | 4.1 (39.4) | −1.2 (29.8) | −5.5 (22.1) | 4.4 (39.9) |
| Mean daily minimum °C (°F) | −8.7 (16.3) | −8.3 (17.1) | −4.6 (23.7) | 0 (32) | 4.4 (39.9) | 8.7 (47.7) | 11.3 (52.3) | 10.1 (50.2) | 6.3 (43.3) | 1.3 (34.3) | −3.1 (26.4) | −7.8 (18.0) | 0.8 (33.4) |
| Record low °C (°F) | −31.0 (−23.8) | −29.5 (−21.1) | −24.1 (−11.4) | −14.0 (6.8) | −5.4 (22.3) | −2.2 (28.0) | 0.5 (32.9) | −0.6 (30.9) | −5.8 (21.6) | −14.5 (5.9) | −22.5 (−8.5) | −31.0 (−23.8) | −31.0 (−23.8) |
| Average precipitation mm (inches) | 51.6 (2.03) | 33.4 (1.31) | 34.4 (1.35) | 34.2 (1.35) | 61.4 (2.42) | 69.1 (2.72) | 77.4 (3.05) | 100.4 (3.95) | 66.1 (2.60) | 68.5 (2.70) | 71.2 (2.80) | 47.8 (1.88) | 715.5 (28.16) |
| Mean monthly sunshine hours | 28 | 68 | 126 | 168 | 212 | 242 | 237 | 195 | 136 | 83 | 44 | 18 | 1,557 |

=== Populated places ===
Lillehammer Municipality is subdivided into the following populated places (i.e.: neighborhoods, quarters, villages, localities, settlements, communities, hamlets, etc.):

- Søre Ål
- Nordre Ål
- Lillehammer Centre
- Nybu
- Vårsetergrenda
- Røyslimoen
- Vingnes
- Jørstadmoen
- Fåberg
- Rudsbygd
- Saksumdal
- Vingrom
- Nordseter
- Hovemoen
- Busmoen

== Economy ==
The basis for the economy of the municipality is its position as the northernmost point of the lake Mjøsa and as the gateway for the Gudbrandsdal region, through which the historical highway from Oslo to Trondheim passes. The Mesna river has provided the basis for several small industries through the years, but Lillehammer is now all but industry-less. –

== Media ==
The regional newspaper Gudbrandsdølen Dagningen has its editorial office in Lillehammer.

The main offices of the commercial radio channel P4 Radio Hele Norge is in Lillehammer.

== Transport ==
One of the major Norwegian rail lines, the Dovre Line, runs from Hamar to the north through Lillehammer on its way up the Gudbrandsdal valley, to terminate in the city of Trondheim. The European route E6 highway also passes through Lillehammer.

== Attractions ==
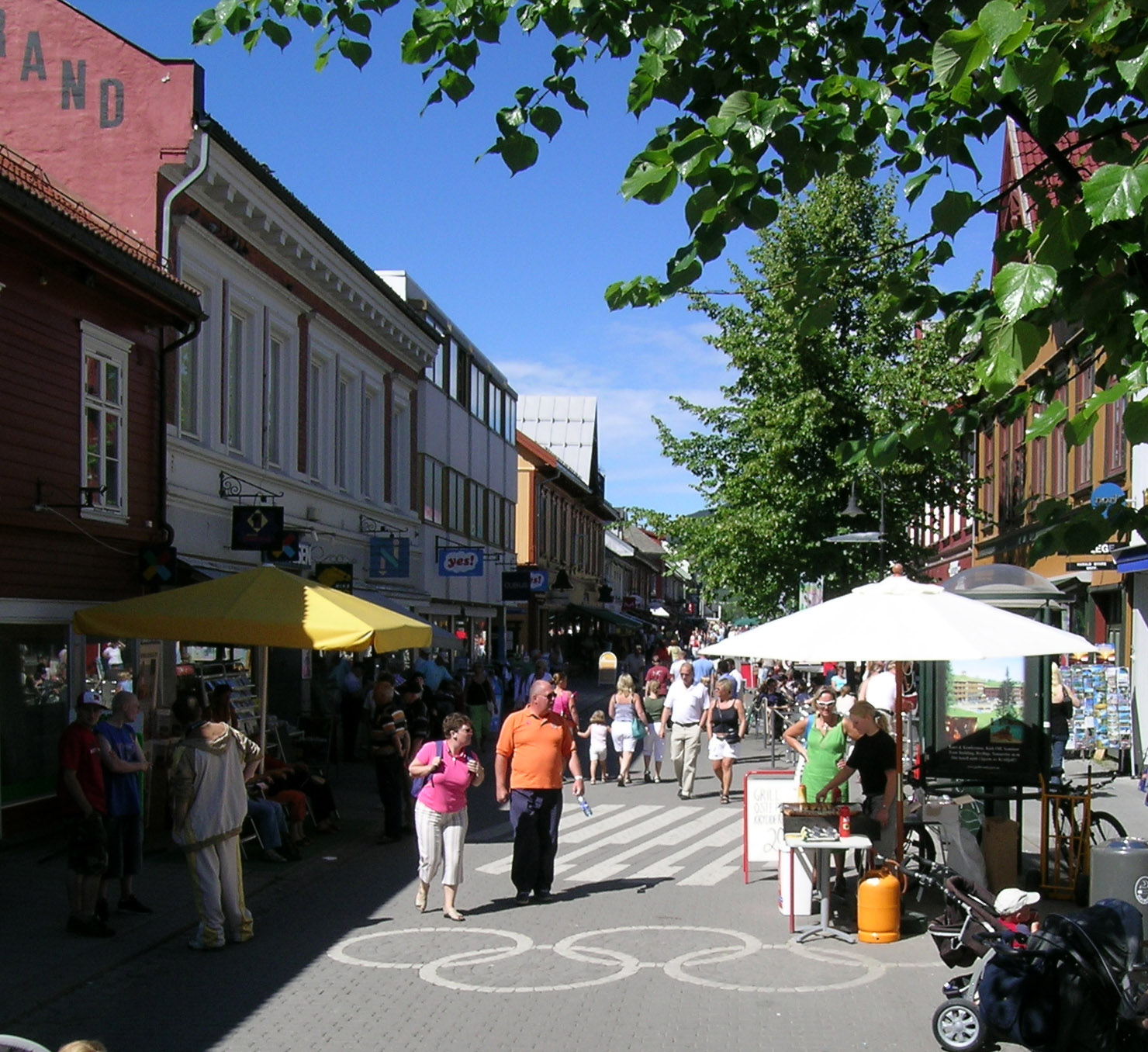
Storgata shopping area

In addition to the Olympic venues, Lillehammer has several tourist attractions:

- Maihaugen, located near the centre of Lillehammer, is the largest open-air museum in Norway. It contains 185 buildings, most of them from Lillehammer and the Gudbrandsdalen valley.
- Garmo Stave Church, built around 1150.
- The Norwegian Olympic Museum, the only museum in Northern Europe devoted to the full history of the Olympic Games, from antiquity to the present, including both the Summer and Winter Games. The museum also includes the Norwegian Sports Hall of Fame and a section on the Lillehammer 1994 Olympic Winter Games. It is located within the indoor museum at Maihaugen.
- Lillehammer Art Museum.
- The Norwegian Road Museum, a large indoor and outdoor museum located 12 kilometres (7 miles) north of Lillehammer city centre.
- Hafjell, a ski resort 15 km (9 mi) from Lillehammer, which hosted the slalom and super-G events during the 1994 Winter Olympics.
- Kvitfjell, a ski resort 55 km (34 mi) from Lillehammer, which hosted the downhill events during the 1994 Winter Olympics.
- The PS Skibladner, the world's oldest paddle steamer in scheduled service, launched in 1856. It operates summer sailings on lake Mjøsa, calling at Lillehammer, Moelv, Gjøvik, Hamar and Eidsvoll.
- The ski jump complex at Lysgårdsbakkene.
- Sjusjøen, a skiing destination with forest and mountain terrain about 20 kilometres (12 miles) east of central Lillehammer, in Ringsaker Municipality.
- The rock carvings at Drotten, in Fåberg, west of Gudbrandsdalslågen and about 1.5 km (0.9 mi) above Brunlaug bridge.
- Mothership with Standing Matter, a sculpture by Antony Gormley housed in a pavilion designed by Snøhetta architects near Lillehammer Station.
- Hunderfossen Adventure Park, an amusement park located 12 kilometres (7 miles) north of Lillehammer city centre.

== Sport ==
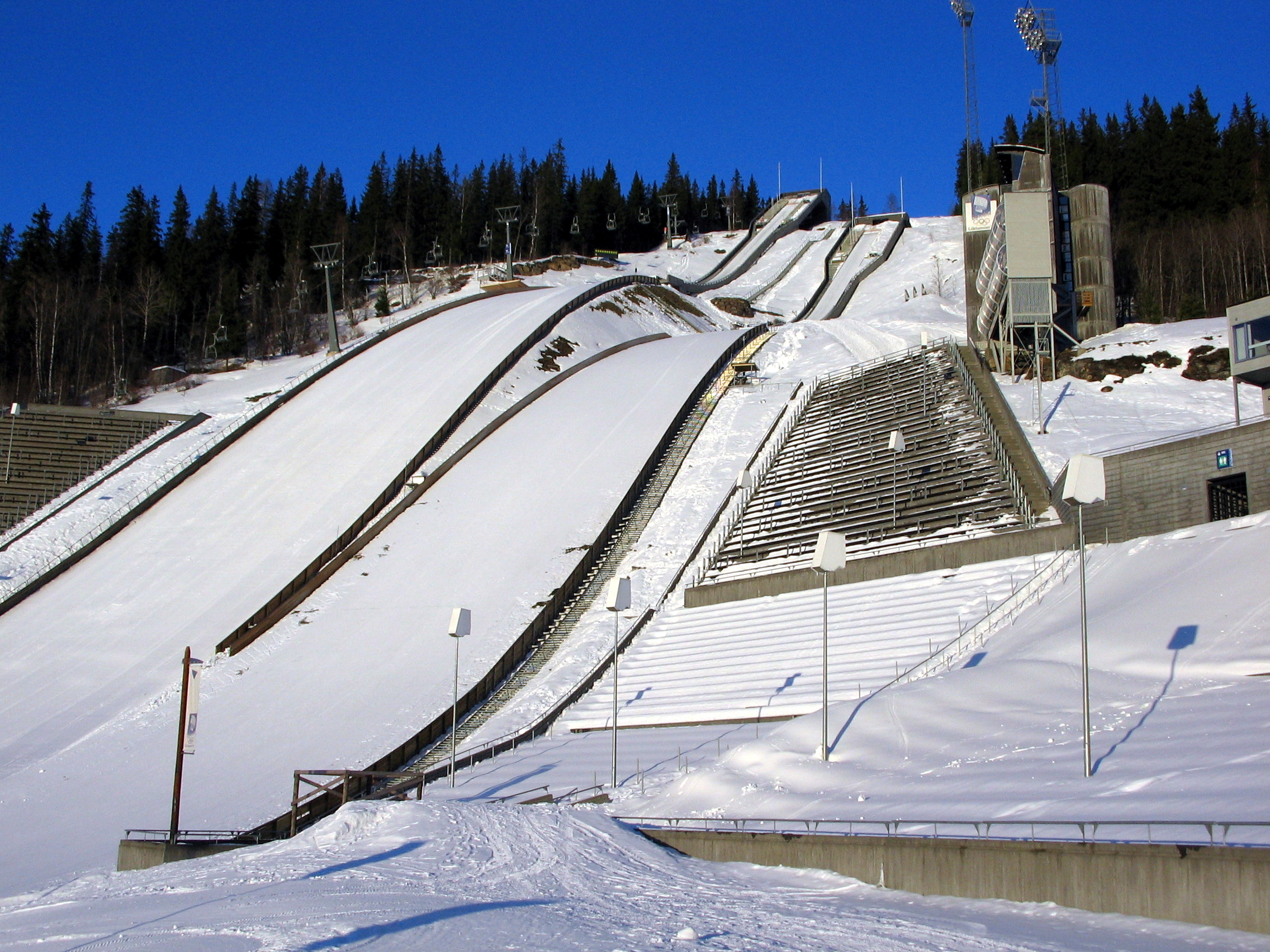
Olympic ski jump

=== Sports clubs ===
- Lillehammer Ishockeyklubb (The team competes in Norway's major hockey league, the GET-League.)
- Lillehammer Innabandy Klubb
- Lillehammer Orienteringsklubb
- Lillehammer Skiklubb
- Lillehammer Fotballklubb
- Lillehammer Frisbee
- Roterud Idrettslag

== Culture ==
Lillehammer is the main location for several annual festivals and events.

- Lillehammer Live, pop music festival.
- DølaJazz, jazz music festival.
- Norwegian Festival of Literature
- Amandus Festival, film festival and competition for young film makers.
- Vinterpride, LGBT pride festival celebrated every February.

== Notable people ==
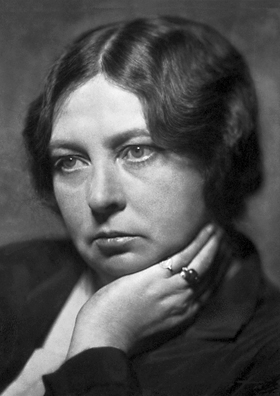
Sigrid Undset, 1928

=== Arts ===
- Kalle Løchen (1865–1893), a painter and actor
- Sigrid Undset (1882–1949), a novelist, awarded the Nobel Prize for Literature in 1928; lived at her home "Bjerkebæk" in Lillehammer from 1919 to 1940 and again after WWII.
- Odd Grythe (1918–1995), a radio and TV personality
- Kjell Lund (1927–2013), an architect, songwriter and singer
- Sveinung Hovensjø (born 1950), a jazz musician, plays bass and guitar
- Kristin Sevaldsen (born 1966), a jazz musician (saxophone), composer, and music producer
- Atle Antonsen (born 1969), a comic and actor, was born in Lillehammer
- Ingrid Olava (born 1981), a singer and musician, born and grew up in Lillehammer

=== Public service ===
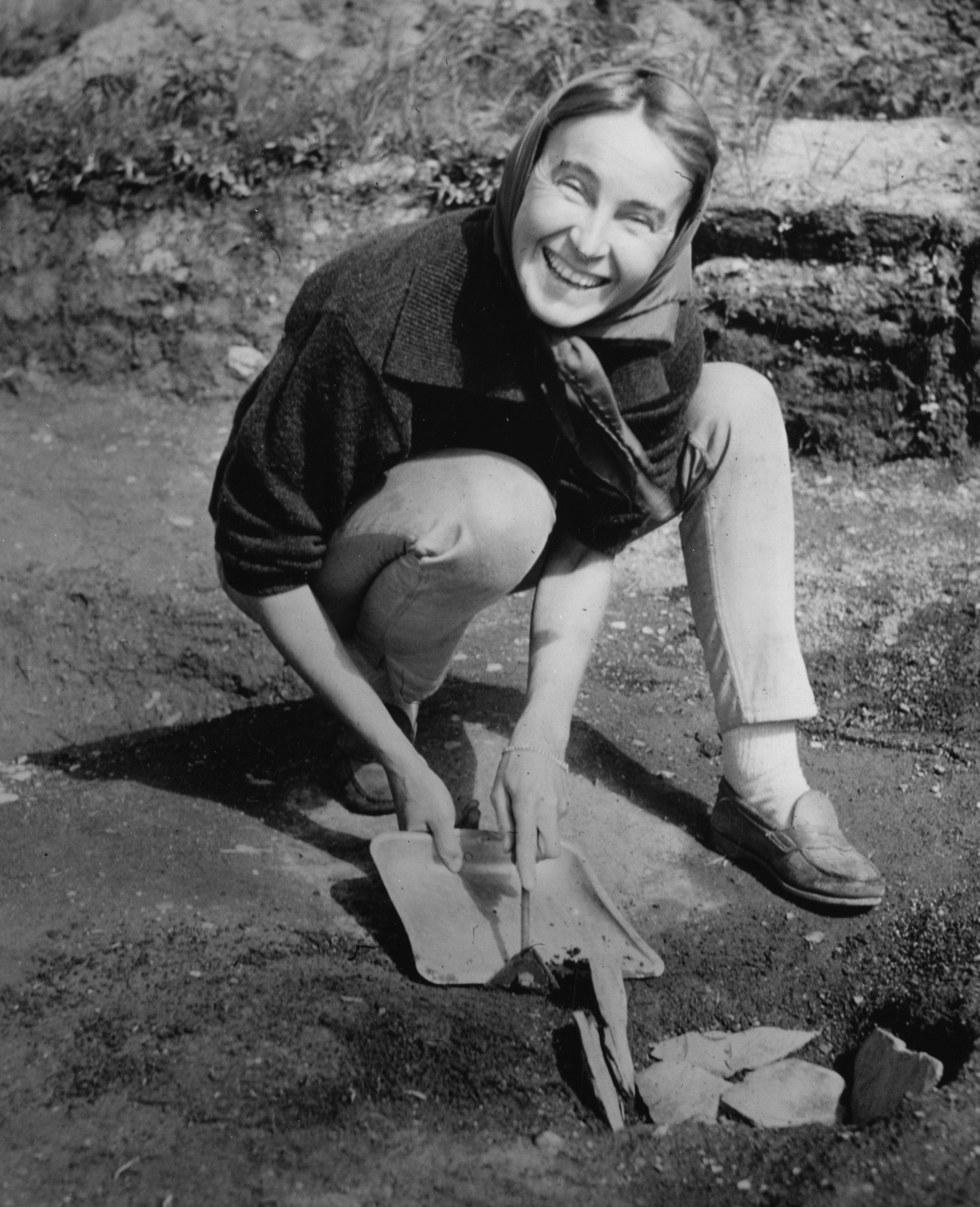
Anne Stine Moe Ingstad, 1963

- Lars Olsen Skrefsrud (1840–1910), a Lutheran missionary in India
- Johan Lunde (1866–1938), a theologian and bishop of the Diocese of Oslo
- Ulrik Frederik Lange (1808–1878), educator and mayor of Lillehammer 1840s & 50s
- Margit Haslund (1885–1963), a women's advocate and mayor of Lillehammer in 1940
- Thor Bjørklund (1889–1975), an inventor, invented the Ostehøvel, a popular cheese slicer
- Anne Stine Ingstad (1918–1997), an archaeologist, discovered Norse remains in Canada
- Kai Holst (1913–1945), a seaman, fur farmer and resistance fighter during WWII
- Nils Slaatto (1922–2001), a prominent and influential Norwegian architect
- Egil Tynæs (1941–2004), an anthroposophical physician, died in Afghanistan
- Bjørn Simensen (born 1947), a director, Norwegian National Opera 1984/1990 & 1997/2009
- Torkil Damhaug (born 1958), a physician and crime fiction writer

=== Sport ===
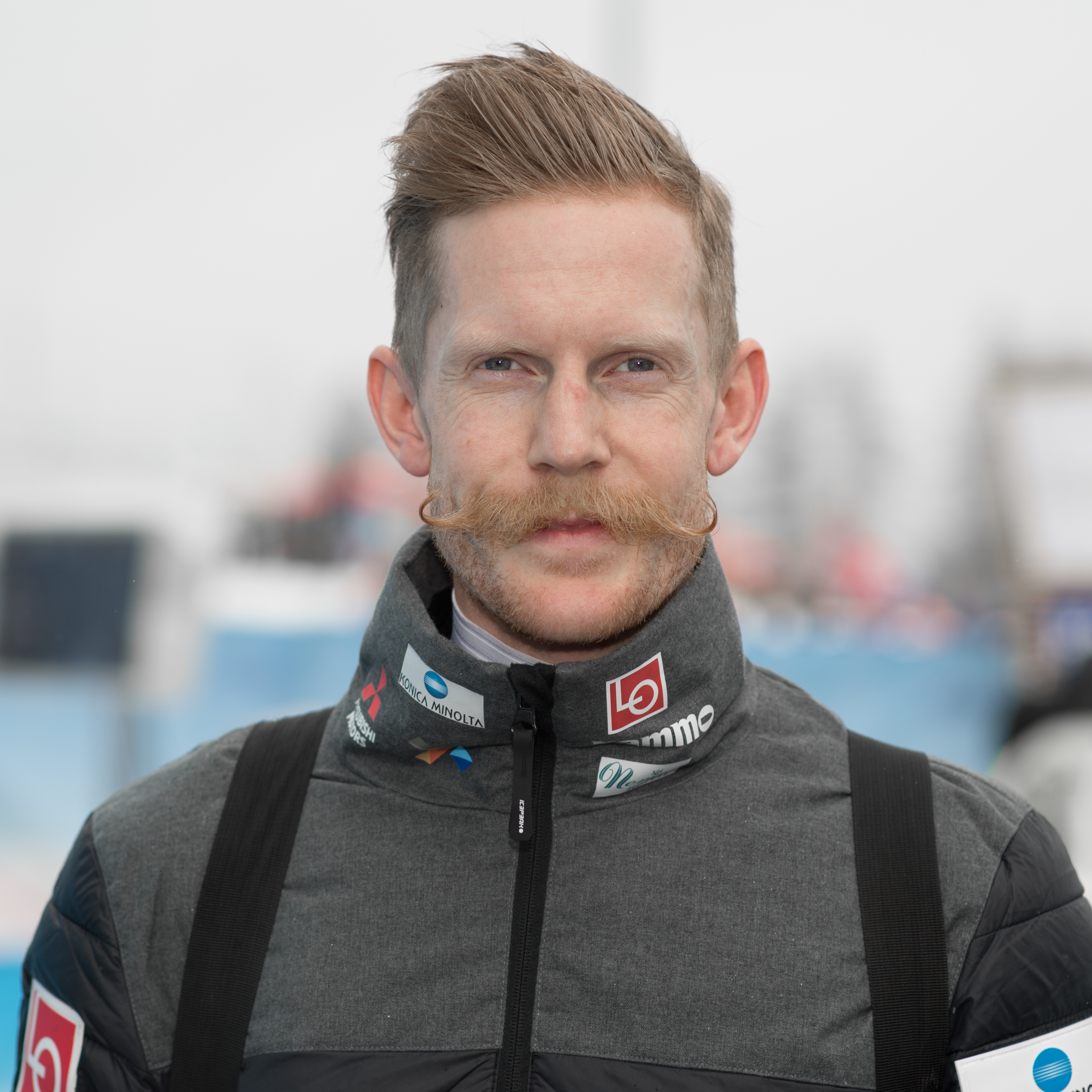
Robert Johansson, 2019

- Ove Nielsen (born 1924), a Danish rower, competed at 1952 Summer Olympics lives locally
- Petter Belsvik (born 1967), a football coach and former player with 383 club caps
- Jon Inge Høiland (born 1977), a former footballer with 396 club caps and 25 for Norway
- Anita Rapp (born 1977), a footballer and team gold medallist at the 2000 Summer Olympics
- Grete Eliassen (born 1986), an American-Norwegian freestyle skier
- Edvald Boasson Hagen (born 1987), a professional road racing cyclist
- Robert Johansson (born 1990), a ski jumper with two bronze and a team gold medal at the 2018 Winter Olympics
- Oskar Svendsen (born 1994), a cyclist, known for holding the record of the highest VO₂ max
- Mads Siljehaug (born 1996), a racing driver

=== Other ===
- Anders Uchermann-Sandvig (1898-1966), newspaper editor

== In popular culture ==
- The Norwegian-American Netflix original series Lilyhammer takes place in Lillehammer. The show stars Steven Van Zandt, who plays Frank "the Fixer" Tagliano, a New York mobster who moves to Lillehammer through the U.S. Witness Protection Program after being inspired by the 1994 Winter Olympics to relocate to Norway.
- Toki Wartooth, the fictional guitarist from the Adult Swim TV show Metalocalypse, was born and raised here.
- The British automotive and entertainment TV series Top Gear filmed an Olympic special using many of the venues from the 1994 Winter Olympics.

== Twin towns – sister cities ==
Lillehammer has sister city agreements with the following places:

- Autrans-Méaudre-en-Vercors, France
- Hayward, United States
- Hørsholm, Denmark
- Leksand, Sweden
- Minamiuonuma, Japan
- Oberhof, Germany
- Oulainen, Finland

=== Friendly cities ===
Lillehammer has also friendly relations with:

- Düsseldorf, Germany
- Minakami, Japan
- Radviliškis, Lithuania
- Sarajevo, Bosnia and Herzegovina

== See also ==
- European Youth Parliament
- Junior Eurovision Song Contest 2004
- St. Mary Church, Lillehammer
