= Lillehammer (town) =

Town in Innlandet, Norway

- Town/City
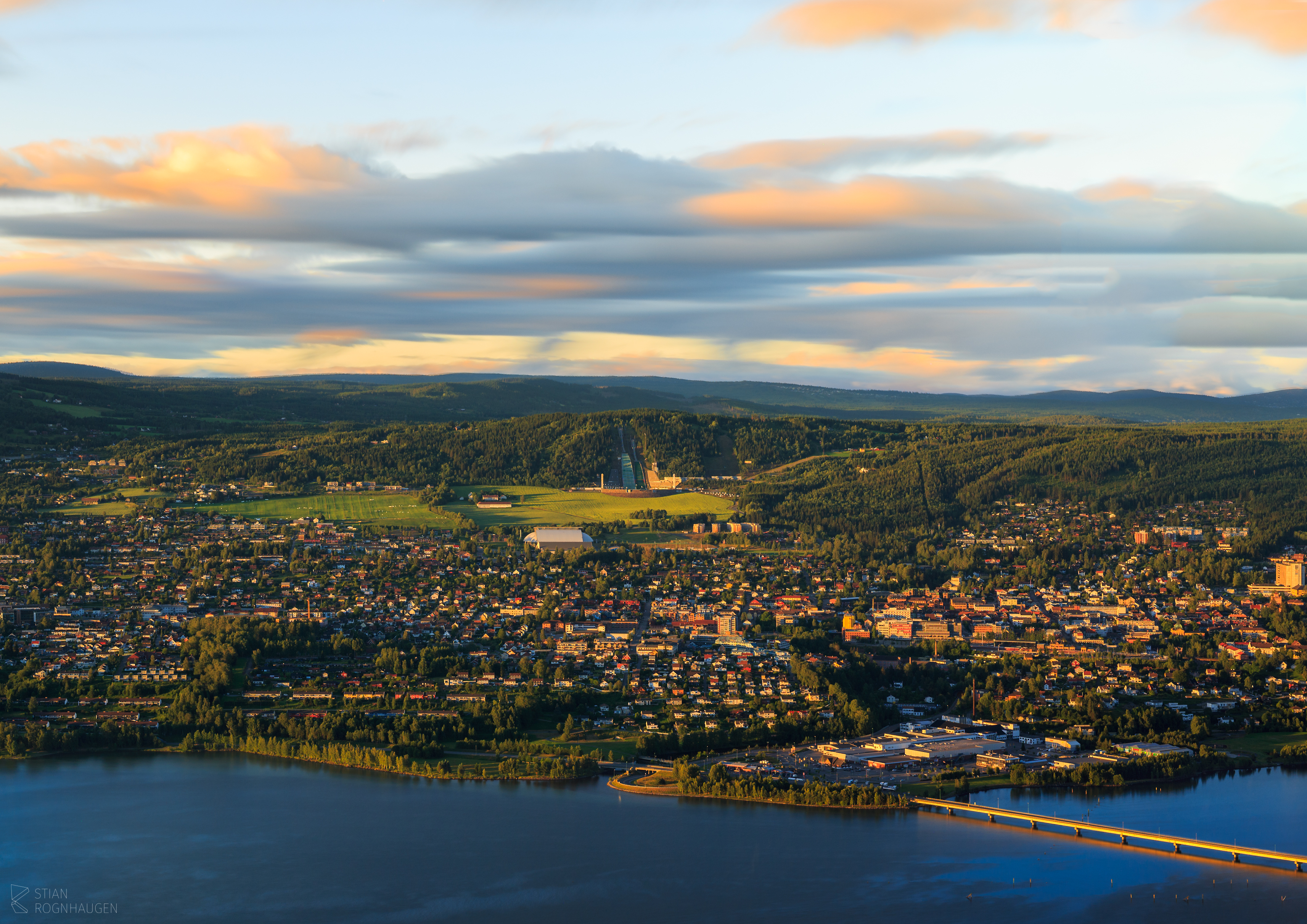
- View of the town
- Interactive map of Lillehammer
- Location within Innlandet Location within Norway
- Coordinates: 61.11514°N 10.46628°E
- Country: Norway
- Region: Eastern Norway
- County: Innlandet
- District: Gudbrandsdalen
- Municipality: Lillehammer Municipality
- Established as
- Kjøpstad: 7 Aug 1827

Area
  - Total: 11.53 km^{2} (4.45 sq mi)
- Elevation: 197 m (646 ft)

Population (2024)
  - Total: 21,468
  - Density: 1,862/km^{2} (4,820/sq mi)
- Demonym: Lillehamring
- Time zone: UTC+01:00 (CET)
  - Summer (DST): UTC+02:00 (CEST)
- Post Code: 2609 Lillehammer

Lillehammer (Norwegian pronunciation: [ˈlɪ̂lːəˌhɑmːər]) is a town which is the administrative centre of Lillehammer Municipality in Innlandet county, Norway. The town is located along the river Gudbrandsdalslågen at the northern end of the lake Mjøsa in the southern Gudbrandsdal valley. Historically, the town of Lillehammer was the administrative centre of the old Oppland county (Oppland merged with Hedmark county on 1 January 2020 to form Innlandet county).

The 11.53-square-kilometre (4.45 sq mi) town has a population (2024) of 21,468 and a population density of 1,862 inhabitants per square kilometre (4,820/sq mi).

The European route E6 highway and the Dovrebanen railway line each pass through the town, and some passenger trains on the railway halt at the Lillehammer Station. The city centre is a late nineteenth-century concentration of wooden houses, which enjoys a picturesque location overlooking the northern part of lake Mjøsa and the river Lågen, surrounded by mountains. Lillehammer hosted the 1994 Winter Olympics and 2016 Winter Youth Olympics.

== History ==
The town of Lillehammer is located at the northern end of Norway's largest lake, Mjøsa. There have likely been settlements here since the Iron Age and the market here was mentioned in Håkon Håkonson's saga in 1390. Tradition states that it was here in Lillehammer where the birkebeiners Torstein Skjevla and Skjervald Skrukka joined up with the King's son (and future King), Haakon, in 1205 before they traveled to Østerdalen (an event which is commemorated in March every year to this day). Since medieval times, the Lillehammer Church has been located here.

The town was granted market town rights on 7 August 1827 as a kjøpstad. At that time, 50 people lived within the boundaries of the newly established town. This site was chosen because there were no other towns in Christians amt (county), and this site was located along the Gudbrandsdalslågen river; the whole Gudbrandsdal valley was a major transportation route from the capital to northern Norway. Within two years of the establishment of the town, the population had risen to 360 people. The merchant Ludvig Wiese has been counted as the founder of the town (a statue of him was erected in the town in connection with the town's 100th anniversary in 1927). The laying of the main railway line from the capital in Christiania to Eidsvoll was completed in 1852. This railway line was connected with steamships along the lake Mjøsa which travelled to Lillehammer and from there a newly laid road made connections further up into the Gudbrandsdalen valley. This transport system made the transit of timber and agricultural goods from all over the county to the capital possible, and it contributed to the growth of the town of Lillehammer.

The 1994 Winter Olympics were held in Lillehammer. In preparation for this, new sports facilities were built and existing cultural buildings and roads were upgraded throughout the town and surrounding areas.

=== Self-Government ===
After the passage of the formannskapsdistrikt law on 1 January 1838, the town was granted local self-government rights (along with all local municipalities in Norway; prior to this time, there was no local government structure in Norway). Under this new law, the town could elect a town council. On 1 January 1906, a small adjacent area of the neighboring Fåberg Municipality (population: 140) was annexed by the town to make room for more expansion as the town grew. There were many municipal mergers across Norway during the 1960s, due to the work of the Schei Committee. On 1 January 1964, the town of Lillehammer (population: 5,905) was merged with Fåberg Municipality (population: 13,381) to form a new, larger Lillehammer Municipality.

=== Etymology ===
The town was named after the old Hamar farm (Old Norse: Hamarr), since the first Lillehammer Church was built there. The name is identical with the word hamarr which means "rocky hill". To distinguish it from the nearby town of Hamar and Diocese of Hamar, it began to be called "little Hamar": Lilþlæ Hamar and Litlihamarr, and finally Lillehammer. It is also mentioned in the Old Norse sagas as Litlikaupangr ("Little Trading Place").

== See also ==
- List of towns and cities in Norway
