= Fåberg (disambiguation) =

Fåberg or Faaberg may refer to:

== Places ==
- Fåberg Municipality, a former municipality in the old Oppland county, Norway
- Fåberg (village), a village in Lillehammer Municipality in Innlandet county, Norway
- Fåberg Church, a church in Lillehammer Municipality in Innlandet county, Norway
- Fåberg Station, a railway station in Lillehammer Municipality in Innlandet county, Norway

== Other ==
- Fåberg stone, a runestone near the Fåberg Church
- Faaberg Fotball, a football club based in the village of Fåberg
