= Reichwein =

Reichwein is a German surname. Notable people with the surname include:

- Georg Reichwein, Sr. (1593–1667), German-Norwegian military officer
  - Georg Reichwein (Jr) (1630–1710), military government official
- Leopold Reichwein (1878–1945), German conductor and composer
- Marcel Reichwein (b. 1986), German footballer
- Adolf Reichwein (1898–1944), German educator, economist and cultural policymaker
  - Adolf-Reichwein-Gymnasium (ARG), a grammar school in Heusenstamm, Germany
- 8684 Reichwein (1992 FO3), a main-belt asteroid discovered on 1992 by F. Borngen

== See also ==
- Maria Richwine
- Weinreich
- Weinrich
