= Fåberg Municipality =

Former municipality in Oppland, Norway

Fåberg Municipality Fåberg herred
- Former municipality
- Faaberg herred (historic name)
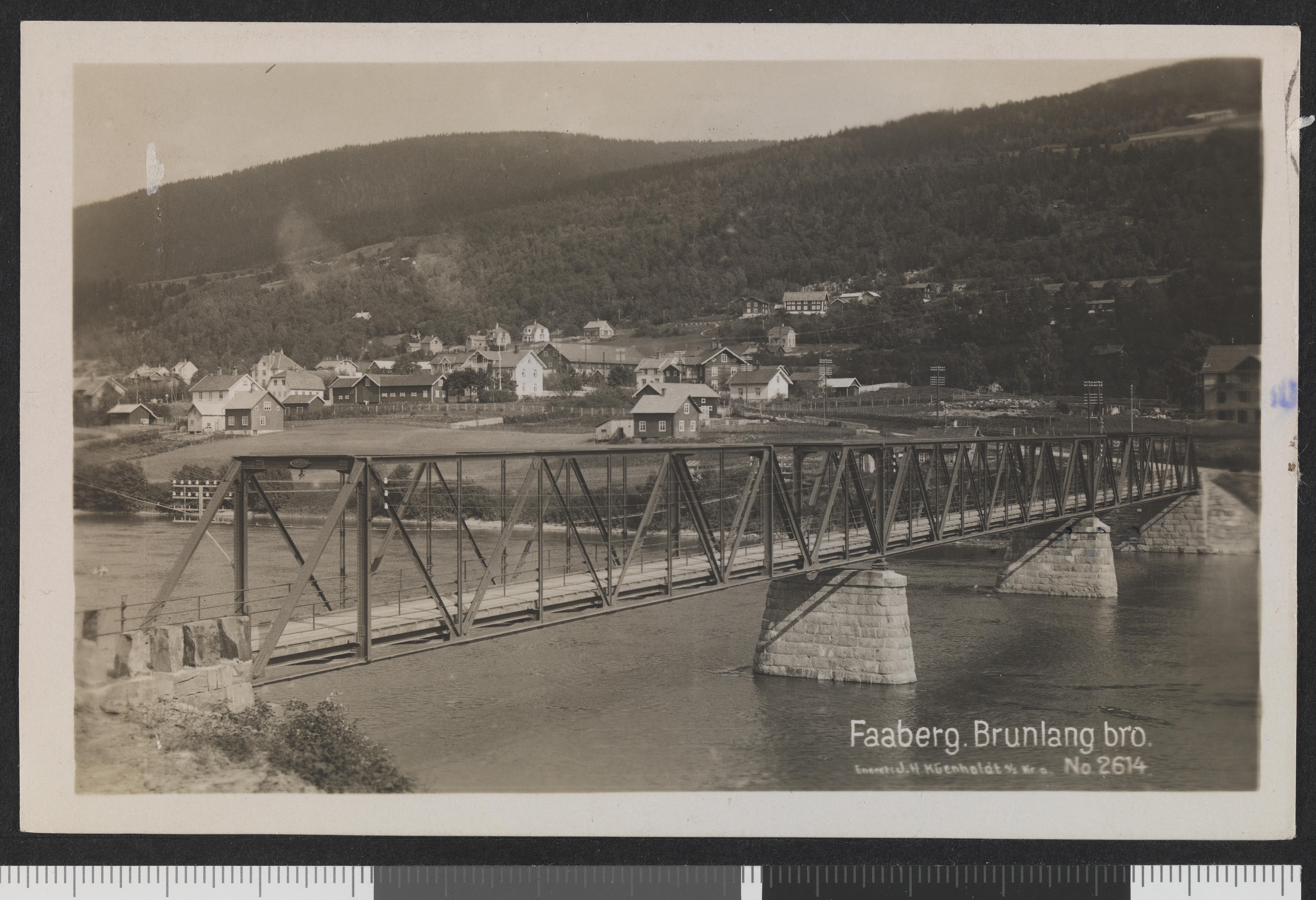
- View of Faaberg

- Oppland within Norway

- Fåberg within Oppland
- Coordinates: 61°10′06″N 10°24′17″E
- Country: Norway
- County: Oppland
- District: Gudbrandsdal
- Established: 1 Jan 1838
  - Created as: Formannskapsdistrikt
- Disestablished: 1 Jan 1964
  - Succeeded by: Lillehammer Municipality
- Administrative centre: Fåberg

Government
  - Mayor (1961–1963): Magne Henriksen (Ap)

Area (upon dissolution)
  - Total: 477.7 km^{2} (184.4 sq mi)
  - Rank: #205 in Norway
- Highest elevation: 1,090.63 m (3,578.2 ft)

Population (1963)
  - Total: 13,292
  - Rank: #40 in Norway
  - Density: 27.8/km^{2} (72/sq mi)
  - Change (10 years): ▲ +26%

Official language
  - Norwegian form: Nynorsk
- Time zone: UTC+01:00 (CET)
  - Summer (DST): UTC+02:00 (CEST)
- ISO 3166 code: NO-0524

Fåberg is a former municipality in the old Oppland county, Norway. The 478-square-kilometre (185 sq mi) municipality existed from 1838 until its merge with Lillehammer in 1964. The area is now a rural area as a part of Lillehammer Municipality in the traditional district of Gudbrandsdalen. The administrative centre was the village of Fåberg. Today, Fåberg consist of the area within the Fåberg Parish and the mountainous parts of the municipality. Fåberg Vestfjell and Fåberg Østfjell, Nordseter.

Prior to its dissolution in 1963, the 477.7-square-kilometre (184.4 sq mi) municipality was the 205th largest by area out of the 689 municipalities in Norway. Fåberg Municipality was the 40th most populous municipality in Norway with a population of about 13,292. The municipality's population density was 27.8 inhabitants per square kilometre (72/sq mi) and its population had increased by 26% over the previous 10-year period.

== General information ==
The prestegjeld of Faaberg (later spelled Fåberg) was established as a municipality on 1 January 1838 (see formannskapsdistrikt law). On 1 January 1906, a part of Faaberg Municipality (population: 140) that was adjacent to the town of Lillehammer was transferred from Faaberg Municipality to the growing town of Lillehammer. During the 1960s, there were many municipal mergers across Norway due to the work of the Schei Committee. On 1 January 1964, Fåberg Municipality (population: 13,381) was merged with the town of Lillehammer (population: 5,905) to form a new Lillehammer Municipality.

=== Name ===
The municipality (originally the parish) is named after the old Faaberg farm (Old Norse: Fágaberg) since the first Fåberg Church was built there. The meaning of the first element is uncertain, but it may come from the word fága which means "to clean" or "to polish". The last element is berg which means "mountain" or "rock". On 21 December 1917, a royal resolution enacted the 1917 Norwegian language reforms. Prior to this change, the name was spelled Faaberg with the digraph "aa", and after this reform, the name was spelled Fåberg, using the letter å instead.

=== Churches ===
The Church of Norway had two parishes (sokn) within Fåberg Municipality. At the time of the municipal dissolution, it was part of the Fåberg prestegjeld and the Sør-Gudbrandsdal prosti (deanery) in the Diocese of Hamar.

Churches in Fåberg Municipality
Parish (sokn)	Church name	Location of the church	Year built
Fåberg	Fåberg Church	Fåberg	1727
Fåberg	Saksumdal Chapel	Saksumdalen	1875
Mesna	Vingrom Church	Vingrom	1908

== Geography ==
The municipality was located at the northern end of Mjøsa, Norway's largest lake. Øyer Municipality was located to the north, Østre Gausdal Municipality and Vestre Gausdal Municipality were located to the northwest, Torpa Municipality was located to the west, Biri Municipality was located to the south, and Ringsaker Municipality was located to the southeast and east (in Hedmark county). The small Lillehammer Municipality was located within Fåberg Municipality as an enclave. The highest point in the municipality was the 1,090.63-metre (3,578.2 ft) tall mountain Nevelfjell, just south of the border with Øyer Municipality.

== Government ==
While it existed, Fåberg Municipality was responsible for primary education (through 10th grade), outpatient health services, senior citizen services, welfare and other social services, zoning, economic development, and municipal roads and utilities. The municipality was governed by a municipal council of directly elected representatives. The mayor was indirectly elected by a vote of the municipal council. The municipality was under the jurisdiction of the Eidsivating Court of Appeal.

=== Municipal council ===
The municipal council (Herredsstyre) of Fåberg Municipality was made up of representatives that were elected to four year terms. The tables below show the historical composition of the council by political party.

Fåberg herredsstyre 1959–1963
Party name (in Norwegian)	Number of representatives
Labour Party (Arbeiderpartiet)	19
Conservative Party (Høyre)	5
Communist Party (Kommunistiske Parti)	1
Christian Democratic Party (Kristelig Folkeparti)	2
Centre Party (Senterpartiet)	6
Liberal Party (Venstre)	2
Total number of members:	35
Note: On 1 January 1964, Fåberg Municipality became part of Lillehammer Municipality.

Fåberg herredsstyre 1955–1959
Party name (in Norwegian)	Number of representatives
Labour Party (Arbeiderpartiet)	20
Conservative Party (Høyre)	4
Communist Party (Kommunistiske Parti)	1
Christian Democratic Party (Kristelig Folkeparti)	2
Farmers' Party (Bondepartiet)	6
Liberal Party (Venstre)	2
Total number of members:	35

Fåberg herredsstyre 1951–1955
Party name (in Norwegian)	Number of representatives
Labour Party (Arbeiderpartiet)	13
Conservative Party (Høyre)	2
Communist Party (Kommunistiske Parti)	1
Christian Democratic Party (Kristelig Folkeparti)	1
Farmers' Party (Bondepartiet)	5
Liberal Party (Venstre)	2
Total number of members:	24

Fåberg herredsstyre 1947–1951
Party name (in Norwegian)	Number of representatives
Labour Party (Arbeiderpartiet)	13
Communist Party (Kommunistiske Parti)	1
Christian Democratic Party (Kristelig Folkeparti)	1
Farmers' Party (Bondepartiet)	5
Joint list of the Liberal Party (Venstre) and the Radical People's Party (Radikale Folkepartiet)	3
Joint List(s) of Non-Socialist Parties (Borgerlige Felleslister)	1
Total number of members:	24

Fåberg herredsstyre 1945–1947
Party name (in Norwegian)	Number of representatives
Labour Party (Arbeiderpartiet)	13
Communist Party (Kommunistiske Parti)	1
Christian Democratic Party (Kristelig Folkeparti)	1
Farmers' Party (Bondepartiet)	6
Joint list of the Liberal Party (Venstre) and the Radical People's Party (Radikale Folkepartiet)	3
Total number of members:	24

Fåberg herredsstyre 1937–1941*
Party name (in Norwegian)	Number of representatives
Labour Party (Arbeiderpartiet)	12
Farmers' Party (Bondepartiet)	8
Joint list of the Conservative Party (Høyre) and the Free-minded People's Party (Frisinnede Folkeparti)	1
Joint list of the Liberal Party (Venstre) and the Radical People's Party (Radikale Folkepartiet)	3
Total number of members:	24
Note: Due to the German occupation of Norway during World War II, no elections were held for new municipal councils until after the war ended in 1945.

=== Mayors ===
The mayor (Norwegian: ordfører) of Fåberg Municipality was the political leader of the municipality and the chairperson of the municipal council. The following people have held this position:

- 1838–1845: Christian Dahl
- 1846–1847: Rasmus Lyng
- 1848–1849: Gulbrand Fliflet
- 1849–1856: Christian Dahl
- 1856–1859: Hans A. Jørstad
- 1859–1867: Christian A. Rindal
- 1867–1879: Bernt Dahl
- 1879–1883: Christian A. Rindal
- 1883–1891: Bernt Dahl
- 1891–1897: Simen Tollersrud
- 1897–1901: Thorstein Rustad
- 1901–1907: Karl Lundgaard
- 1907–1910: Johannes Skaug
- 1910–1913: Karl Lundgaard
- 1913–1922: Peder Aslak Owren (ArbDem)
- 1922–1925: Per Tollersrud (Bp)
- 1925–1929: Peder Aslak Owren (ArbDem)
- 1929–1932: Nils Christiansen
- 1932–1934: Per Tollersrud (Bp)
- 1935–1937: Nils Christiansen
- 1937–1940: Carl Haugen (Ap)
- 1941–1945: Nils Christiansen (NS)
- 1945–1957: Oskar Skogly (Ap)
- 1958–1960: Ola Jensvold
- 1961–1963: Magne Henriksen (Ap)

== Notable people ==
Notable people that were born or lived in Fåberg include:

- Carl Sofus Lumholtz (1851–1922), an explorer, ethnographer, and archaeologist
- Kalle Løchen (1865–1893), a painter and actor
- Lars Olsen Skrefsrud (1840–1910), a missionary and language researcher in India

== See also ==
- List of former municipalities of Norway
