= Vingrom Church =

Church in Innlandet, Norway

- Vingrom kirke
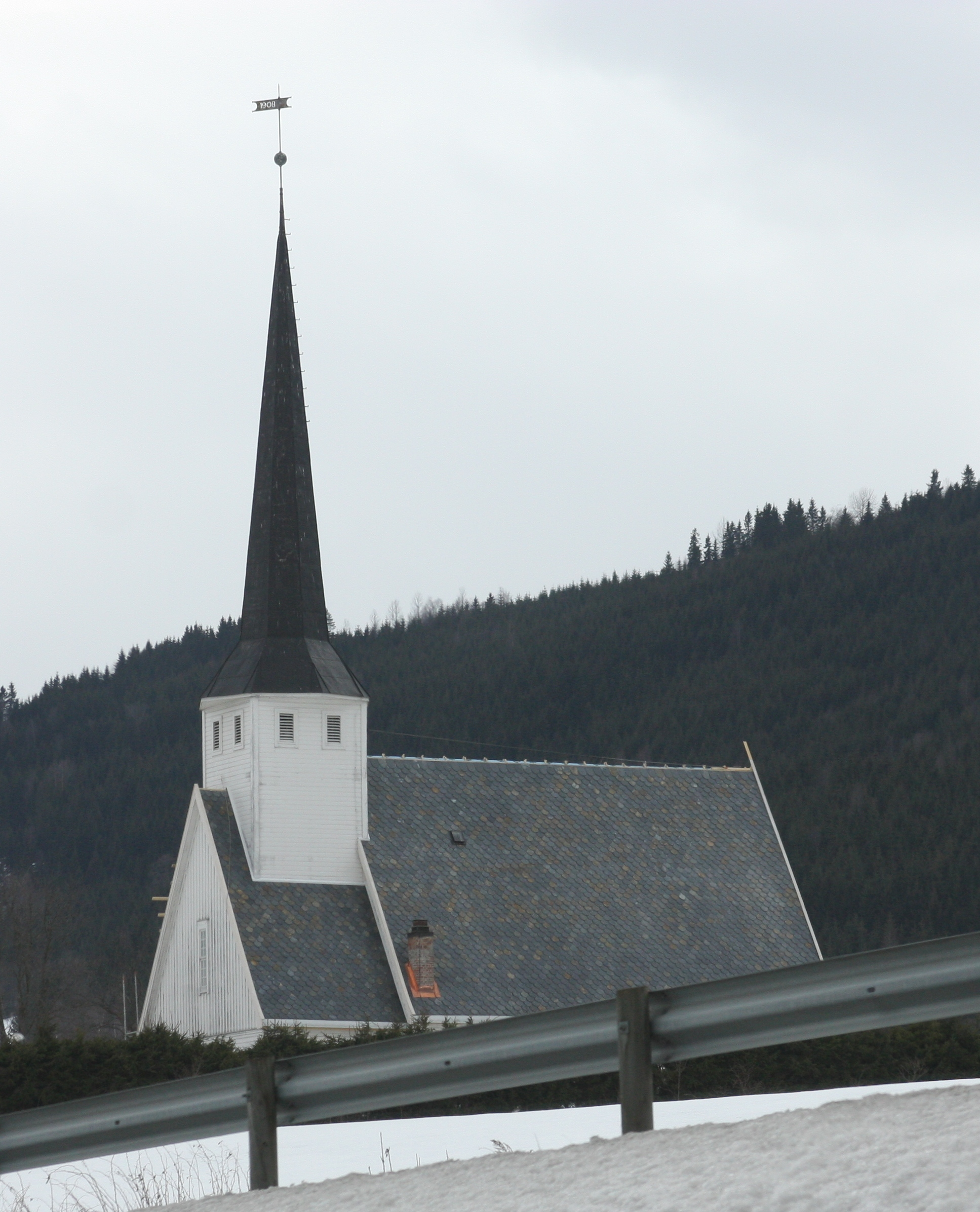
- View of the church
- Vingrom Church
- 61°04′20″N 10°25′48″E
- Location: Lillehammer Municipality, Innlandet
- Country: Norway
- Denomination: Church of Norway
- Churchmanship: Evangelical Lutheran

History
- Status: Parish church
- Founded: 1908
- Consecrated: 21 October 1908

Architecture
- Functional status: Active
- Architect(s): Fin Wollebæk and Heinrich Jürgensen
- Architectural type: Long church
- Style: National Romantic style
- Completed: 1908 (118 years ago)

Specifications
- Capacity: 220
- Materials: Wood

Administration
- Diocese: Hamar bispedømme
- Deanery: Sør-Gudbrandsdal prosti
- Parish: Vingrom
- Norwegian Cultural Heritage Site
- Type: Church
- Status: Not protected
- ID: 85851

Vingrom Church (Norwegian: Vingrom kirke) is a parish church of the Church of Norway in Lillehammer Municipality in Innlandet county, Norway. It is located in the village of Vingrom. It is the church for the Vingrom parish which is part of the Sør-Gudbrandsdal prosti (deanery) in the Diocese of Hamar. The white, wooden church was built in a long church design in the National Romantic style in 1908 using plans drawn up by the architects Fin Wollebæk and Heinrich Jürgensen. The church seats about 220 people.

== History ==
At the start of the 20th century, the parish began planning for a new annex chapel in Vingrom. The new chapel was approved and Fin Wollebæk and Heinrich Jürgensen were hired to design the new building. Ole Eriksen Lande was hired as the lead builder. The new chapel was a wooden long church with a shorter, narrower chancel on the east end and a tower on the west end. The new chapel was consecrated on 21 October 1908. In 1958-1959, the church was extensively remodeled. The ceiling was lowered and vaulted, the walls were paneled, the columns were changed, the organ was moved to a new second floor gallery on the west side, and the stained glass windows were changed. Bjarne Bystad Ellefsen led this renovation. Electric heating was installed in 1971. In 1990, the Vingrom chapel was separated from the large Fåberg Church parish as a separate parish, and the chapel name was changed from Vingrom Chapel to Vingrom Church.

== Vingrom parish ==
Gårdsnummer 1-36 were included in this parish. Gårdsnummer 16-20 are in what is called Døsgrenda which is actually the lower (southern) part of Saksumsdalen valley and are colored differently. The attached KML file shows the church location and the farm locations in Gnr/Bnr format.

== Media gallery ==
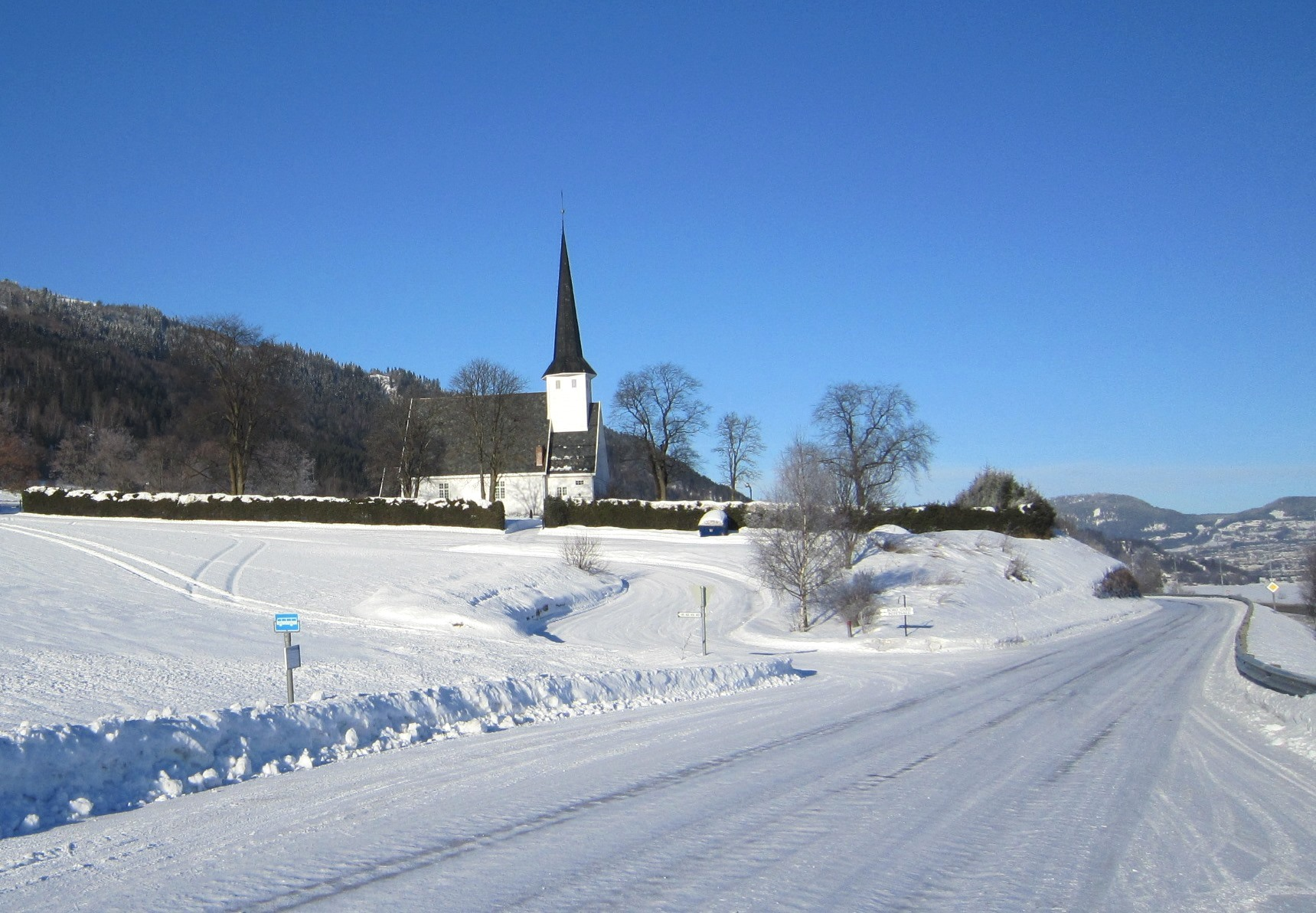

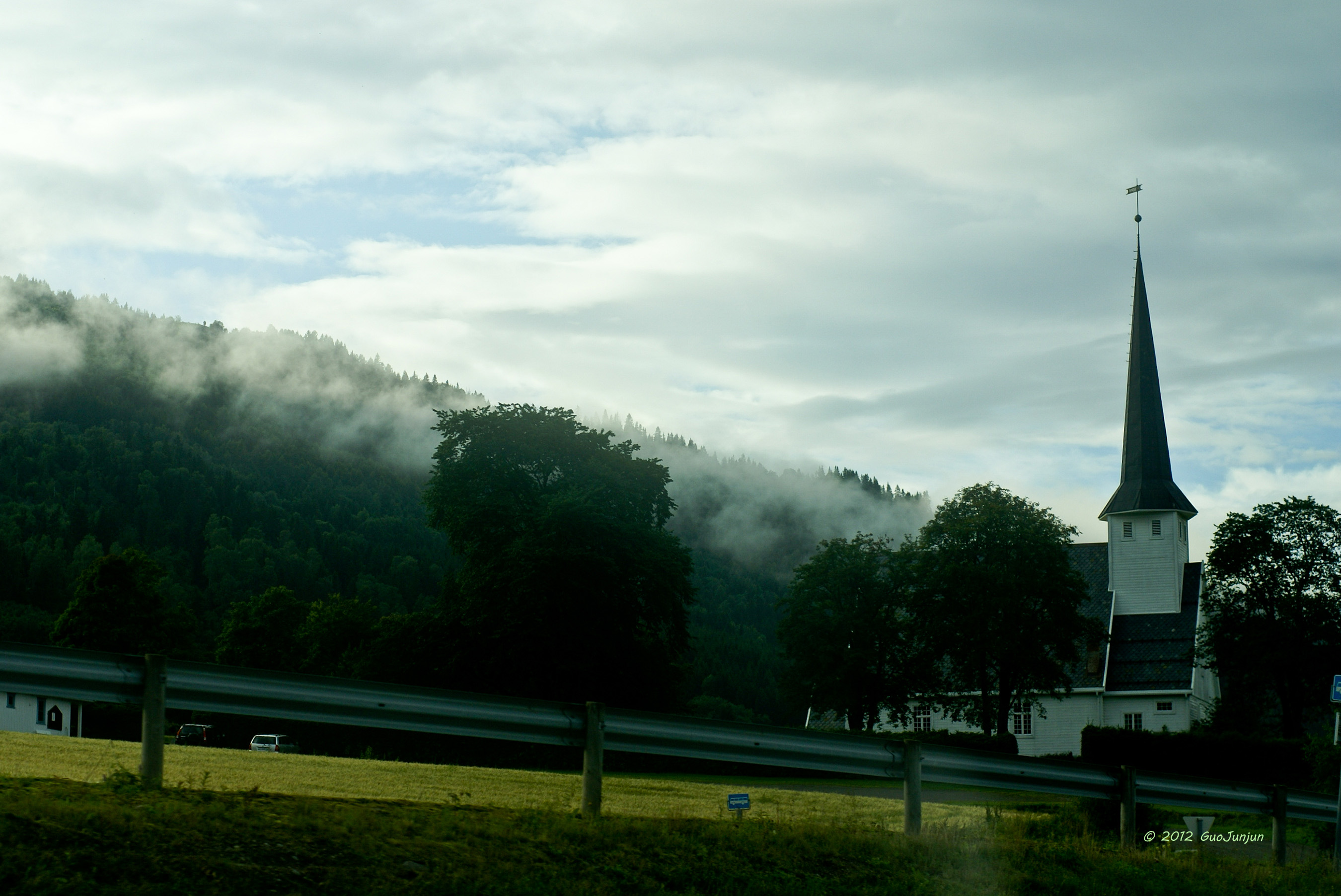

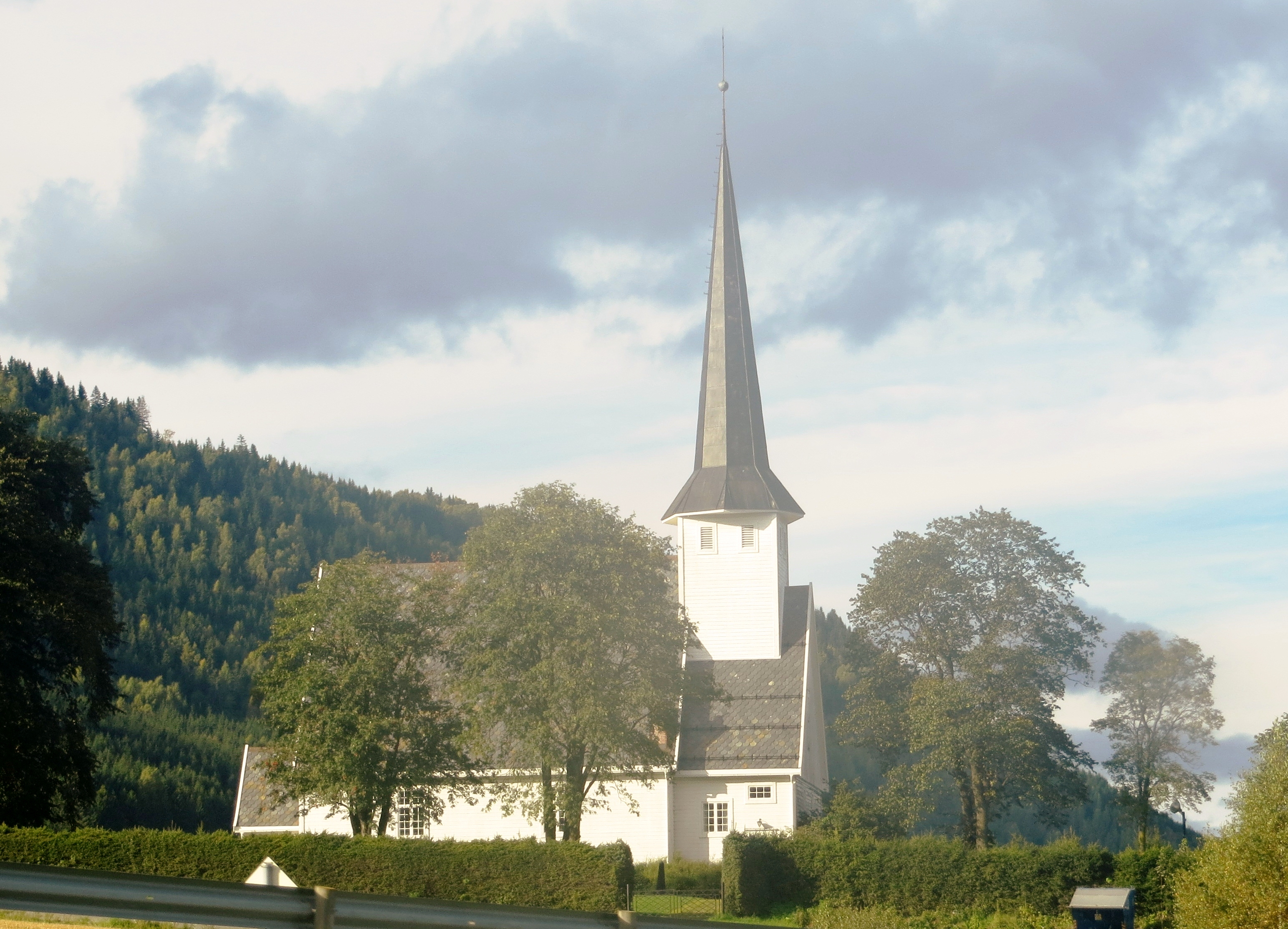

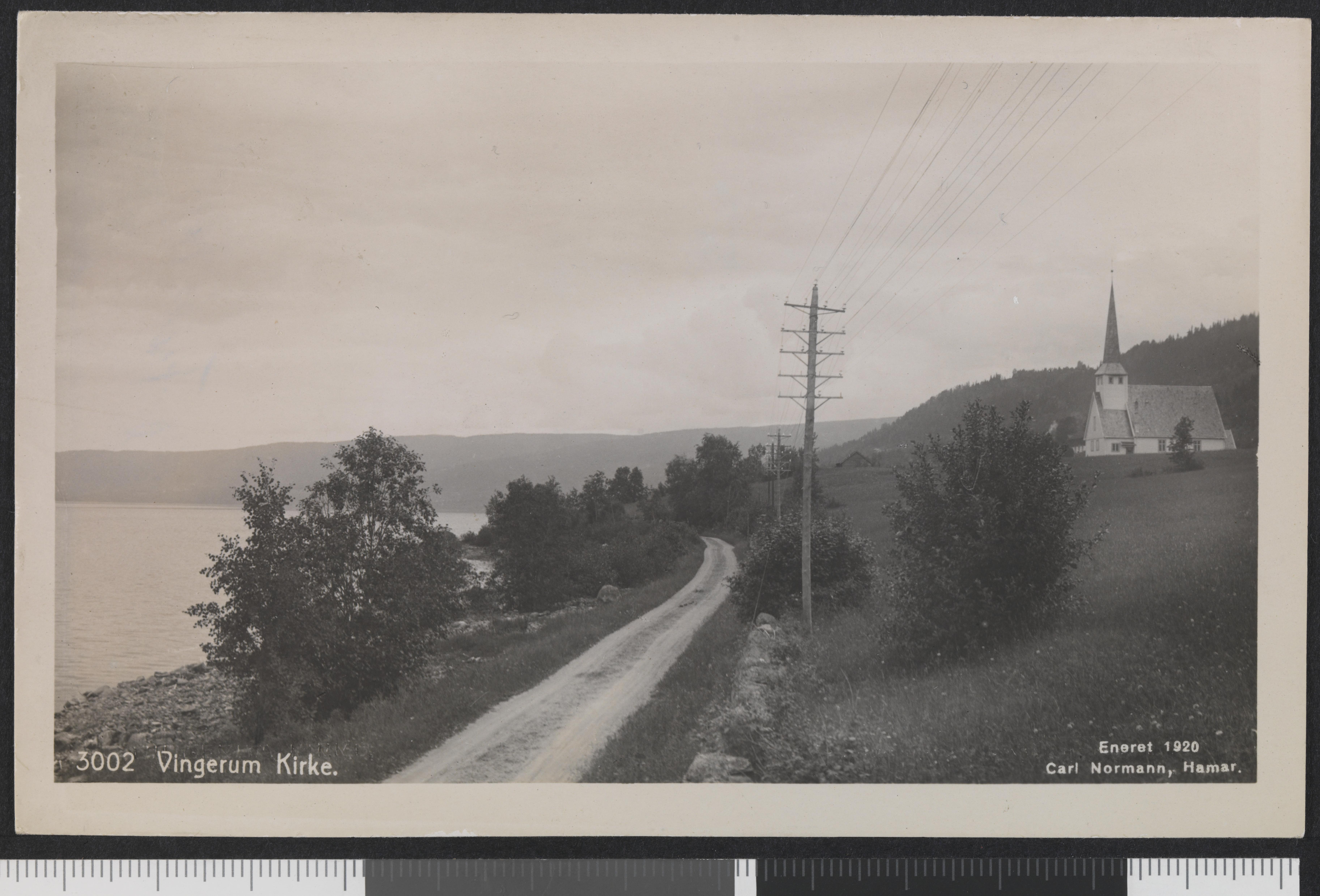

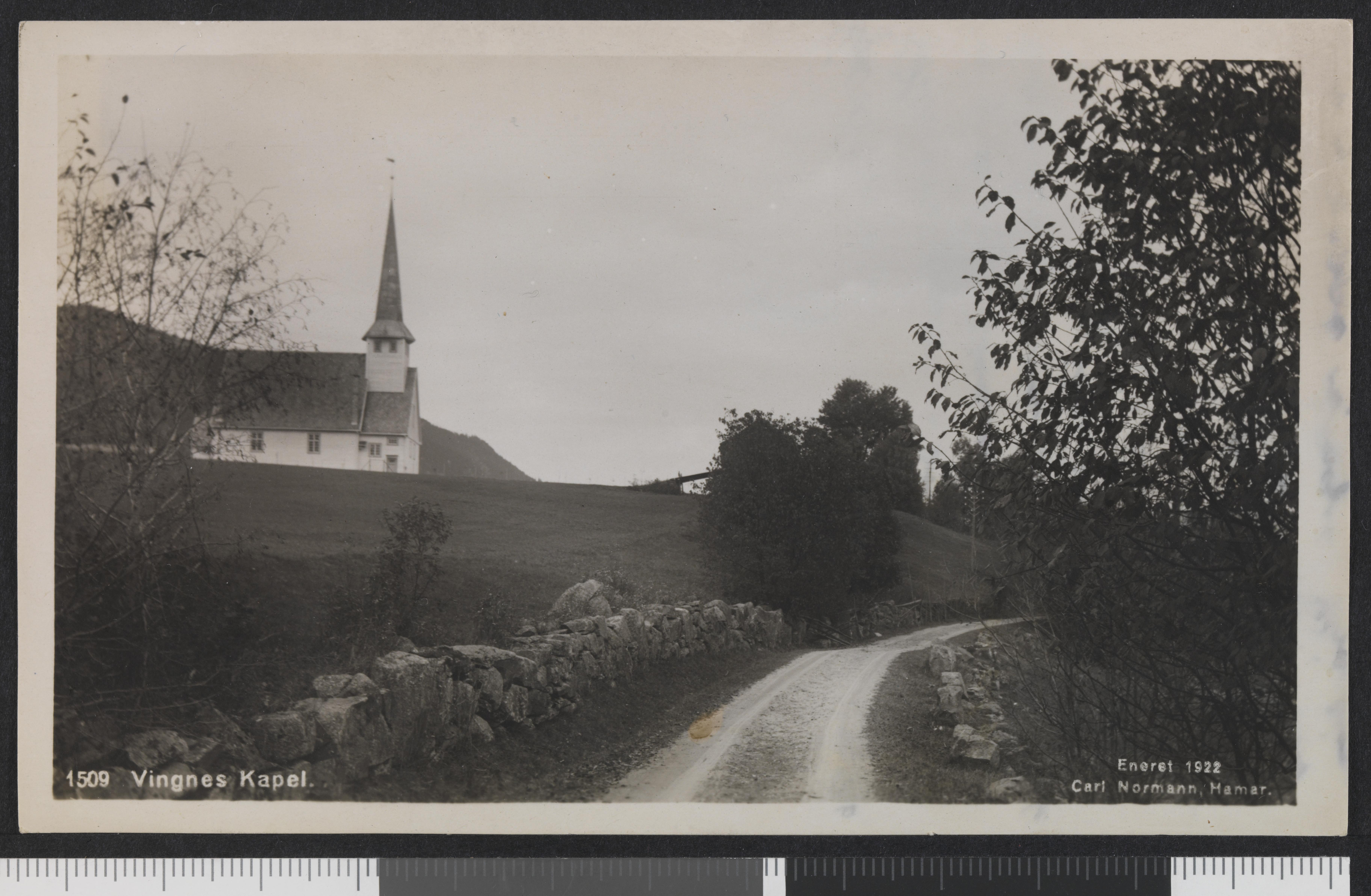

== See also ==
- List of churches in Hamar
