= Georg Reichwein =

Norwegian military leader (1630–1710)

- Born: 1630
- Died: 1710 (aged 79–80)
- Spouse: Catharina Sverdrup (second wife)
- Military career
- Allegiance: Denmark-Norway
- Commands: Kongsvinger Fortress

Georg Reichwein, Jr. (1630–1710) was a military government official. He was the son of general major Georg Reichwein, Sr., who immigrated to Denmark-Norway from Hesse in 1628.

In 1658 he became captain in charge of the Sør-Gudbrandsdalske company. In a letter written in 1664 we find he lived at Jørstad farm in the Fåberg Church parish (near Fåberg). His father was raised to a peerage in 1655, and he would have been foremost in rank at Fåberg in his time. He bought both Nordre Jørstad and Søndre Jørstad farms in 1672.

Reichwein was promoted to major in 1675, and as lieutenant colonel in 1682 he was commander of Kongsvinger Fortress. He remained at Kongsvinger and became a colonel in 1689. He lived at Vingnes in 1695, where he is recorded as married to his second wife, Catharina Sverdrup. He died in 1710. His son Lorentz Reichwein became a military officer and county governor.

Government offices
Preceded by Claus von Ahlefeldt	County Governor of Bergenhus stiftamt 1666–1667	Succeeded by Hans Hansen Lillienskiold
