= Lorentz Reichwein =

Norwegian and Danish military officer

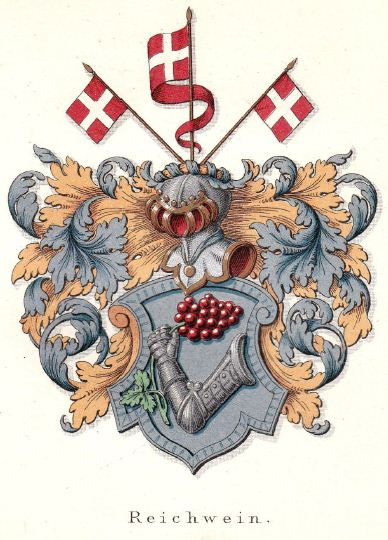
Coat of arms of the Reichwein noble family

Lorentz Reichwein (c. 1680, in Faaberg – 22 April 1735, in Copenhagen) was a Norwegian and Danish military officer. He was a son of Georg Reichwein, and grandson of Georg Reichwein, Sr. He served as county governor (Norwegian: stiftsamtmann) of Akershus county, and his final military rank was Major General. He was owner of a land area in central Christiania which later was called Grünings løkke, consisting of the area from the Pipervika Bay to the current Eidsvolls plass.
