= Saksumdal Church =

Church in Innlandet, Norway

- Saksumdal kirke
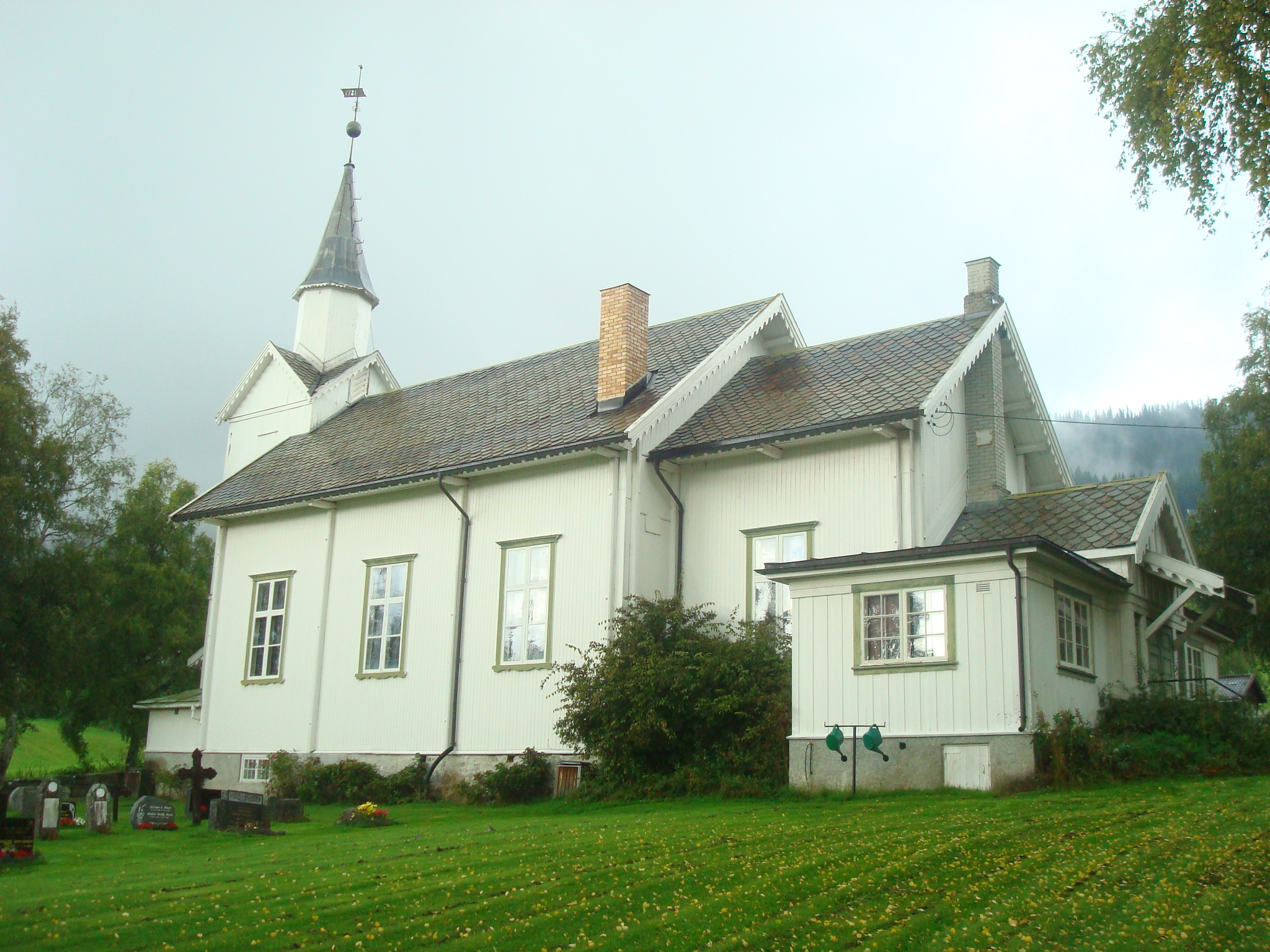
- View of the church
- Saksumdal Church
- 61°06′48″N 10°18′22″E
- Location: Lillehammer Municipality, Innlandet
- Country: Norway
- Denomination: Church of Norway
- Churchmanship: Evangelical Lutheran

History
- Status: Parish church
- Founded: 1875
- Consecrated: 26 August 1875

Architecture
- Functional status: Active
- Architectural type: Long church
- Completed: 1875 (151 years ago)

Specifications
- Capacity: 130
- Materials: Wood

Administration
- Diocese: Hamar bispedømme
- Deanery: Sør-Gudbrandsdal prosti
- Parish: Saksumdal
- Norwegian Cultural Heritage Site
- Type: Church
- Status: Not protected
- ID: 85357

Saksumdal Church (Norwegian: Saksumdal kirke) is a parish church of the Church of Norway in Lillehammer Municipality in Innlandet county, Norway. It is located in the village of Saksumdalen. It is the church for the Saksumdal parish which is part of the Sør-Gudbrandsdal prosti (deanery) in the Diocese of Hamar. The white, wooden church was built in a long church design in 1875 using plans drawn up by an unknown architect. The church seats about 130 people.

== History ==
Historical records and local traditions show that there was a medieval church in the Saksumdalen valley. The medieval church was closed around the year 1590. It was probably located about 700 metres (2,300 ft) to the northwest of the present church site. Not much is known of the medieval church. After the church closed, the area became a part of the Fåberg Church parish.

In 1874, work on the present church began on a site that was donated by Anders Hovland for the construction of an annex chapel for the Saksumdalen valley. A stone mason named Pedersen and the carpenter Kristian Svendsrud started work on the building after other local people donated local timber and volunteered their time and efforts to build the chapel. The chapel was completed in 1875 and it was consecrated on 26 August 1875 by the Bishop Halvor Olsen Folkestad.

The building has undergone several renovations since its construction. It was wired for electric power in 1928. In 1934, sacristies were built on either side of the choir. It was remodeled again in 1951 which included the addition of leaded glass windows. The pulpit had painted figures of the evangelists added in 1953 and the backs of the church benches were sealed in 1954. Later renovations of the building added a basement, outbuilding, and flood lighting. A wheelchair ramp was added in the 1980s.

== Interior ==
The altarpiece was made by Kristian Svendsrud and given to the church as a gift by landowner Anders Hovland. The first organ was installed in 1895 and has now been replaced with a new one. In the 1980s the altar was adorned with textiles by textile artist Inger Holbø, who also made trade fairs. In 2000 the church received pictures by visual artist Borgny Farstad Svalastog.

== See also ==
- List of churches in Hamar
