= Weinreich =

Weinreich (Yiddish: װײַנרײַך, Hebrew: ויינרייך) is a surname. Notable people with the surname include:

- Andrew Weinreich, American serial entrepreneur
- Bernd Weinreich (born 1948), composer, musicologist (de)
- Frank Weinreich (born 1962), German author (de)
- Gustav Weinreich (1886–1980), Danish furniture maker (da)
- Hans Weinreich (1480/1490 – 1566), Polish printer
- Jens Weinreich (born 1965), German sport-journalist (de)
- Justus Weinreich (1858–1927), German composer and musician
- Kurt Weinreich (1908–1998), German football manager, head coach of the Finland national football team
- Manfred Weinreich (born 1946), German rower who represented West Germany
- Max Weinreich (1893/94, Kuldīga – 1969), Jewish-Latvian linguist specializing in Yiddish
  - Uriel Weinreich (1926–1967), Jewish-American linguist specializing in Yiddish
  - Gabriel Weinreich (1928–2023), American physicist
- Otto Weinreich (1886–1972), Jewish German classical philologist (de)
- Regina Weinreich, writer, journalist, teacher
- Torben Weinreich (born 1946), Danish professor (no)

== See also ==
- Weinrich
- Reichwein
