= Festenummer =

A Festenummer or Lease number is part of a unit in the Norwegian property register. The abbreviation is Fnr.

Each municipality is divided into a certain number of Gårdsnummers . Each Gårdsnummer is further divided into Bruksnummers. Under a Bruksnummer, a Festenummer can be established as an independent unit that can be traded and pledged . The festenummer indicates that the property is a rental plot, where an annual rental fee is paid to the owner of the Bruksnummer.

A common way of writing a land registry designation is for example. 17/235/2, where 17 is the Gårdsnummer, 235 is the Bruksnummer and 2 is the Festenummer. Another way of writing is Gnr 17, Bnr. 235, Fnr 2.

== Land Register Hierarchy ==
- - Fylkesnummer
  - - Kommunenummer
    - Gnr. – Gårdsnummer
      - Bnr. – Bruksnummer
        - Fnr. – Festenummer
        - Snr. – Seksjonsnummer
