= Seksjonsnummer =

A Seksjonsnummer or Unit number is part of a unit in the Norwegian land registry. The abbreviation is Snr.

A Seksjon is used where a property consists of several independent owner units to be sold and mortgaged separately, and where it is not normal to share the property in the usual way of sharing a business. Typically, several condominiums are in a building or several businesses are in a shopping center. A seksjon can be of two types: a residential seksjon or a commercial seksjon.

There are several requirements that must be met for a seksjon:

All main seksjons should be part of a building, but they may have specific extras amenities the building. All sections shall have access from the common area. All area that serves common use shall be common area . All residential sections should have their own bathroom, kitchen, bedroom and living room. The entire property must be seksjoned, not just parts of it. A request for seksjoning must be sent to the municipality. If the conditions for sectioning are met, the municipality shall grant permission for seksjoning.

A common way of writing the term for a section unit is e.g. 17/235, Snr.2, where 17 is the Gårdsnummer, 235 is the Bruksnummer and Snr.2 is the seksjonsnummer. Another way of writing is Gnr 17, Bnr 235, Snr 2.

== Land Register Hierarchy ==
- - Fylkesnummer
  - - Kommunenummer
    - Gnr. – Gårdsnummer
      - Bnr. – Bruksnummer
        - Fnr. – Festenummer
        - Snr. – Seksjonsnummer
