= Fåberg stone =

Runestone in Norway

Coordinates: 61°9′40″N 10°22′21″E

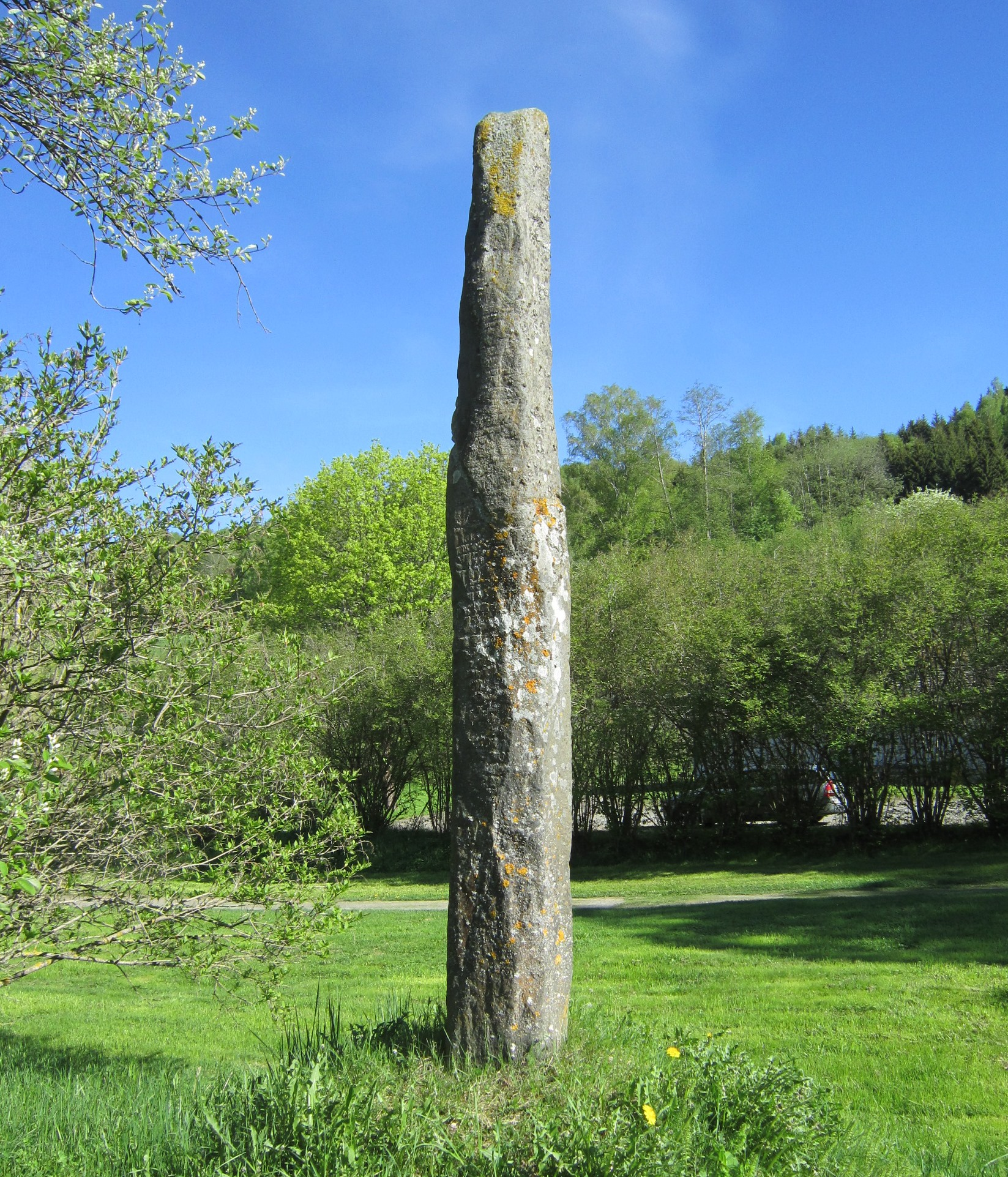
The Fåberg stone

The Fåberg stone (Norwegian: Fåbergsteinen) is a runestone next to Fåberg Church in the village of Fåberg in Lillehammer Municipality in Innlandet County, Norway. It is registered with the Norwegian Directorate for Cultural Heritage under number 58558.

== History ==
In 1775, Gerhard Schøning stated that there were three monoliths at the church but he was apparently unaware of the inscription; the Fåberg stone was one of these three stones. The stone's runic inscription was first transcribed by Christian C. A. Lange, who stated in 1833 that the stone stood directly south of the church, along the road. In 1866, Sophus Bugge was at the site and studied the inscription. He realized that the upper part of the stone had been broken off and had disappeared. In 1870, the missing part was found and it was given to Antiquities Department at the Museum of Cultural History in Oslo. In 1891 the two pieces were joined together, and the complete stone was set up again in Lillehammer. However, many people in Fåberg wished to have the stone returned, and in 1928 it was reinstalled at Fåberg Church, not far from its original site.

== Inscription ==
Magnus Olsen's interpretation of the inscription on the stone is:

ruar raisti stain þana aftir alui faþur sin

Corresponding to Old Norse: Hróarr reisti stein þenna eptir Ǫlvi faður sinn; that is, 'Roar raised this stone in honor of Olve, his father'. The inscription dates from c. 1050.
