= Bruksnummer =

A Bruksnummer or Property unit number is the number for a bruk which is part of a geographical unit in the Norwegian land registry and serves as part of the Assessor's parcel number. The abbreviation is Bnr.

Each municipality is divided into a certain number of Gårdsnummers. Each Gårdsnummer is further divided into Bruksnummers. When a new property is established, it is assigned a new Bruksnnummer under the same Gårdsnummer. A common way of writing a real estate designation is for example. 17/235, where 17 is the Gårdsnummer and 235 is the bruksnummer. Another way of writing is Gnr 17, Bnr 235.

A bruksnummer can also be assigned a Festenummer and Seksjonsnummer number which can also be traded and pledged.

== Land Register Hierarchy ==
- - Fylkesnummer
  - - Kommunenummer
    - Gnr. – Gårdsnummer
      - Bnr. – Bruksnummer
        - Fnr. – Festenummer
        - Snr. – Seksjonsnummer
