= Vingrom =

Village in Lillehammer Municipality, Norway

- Village
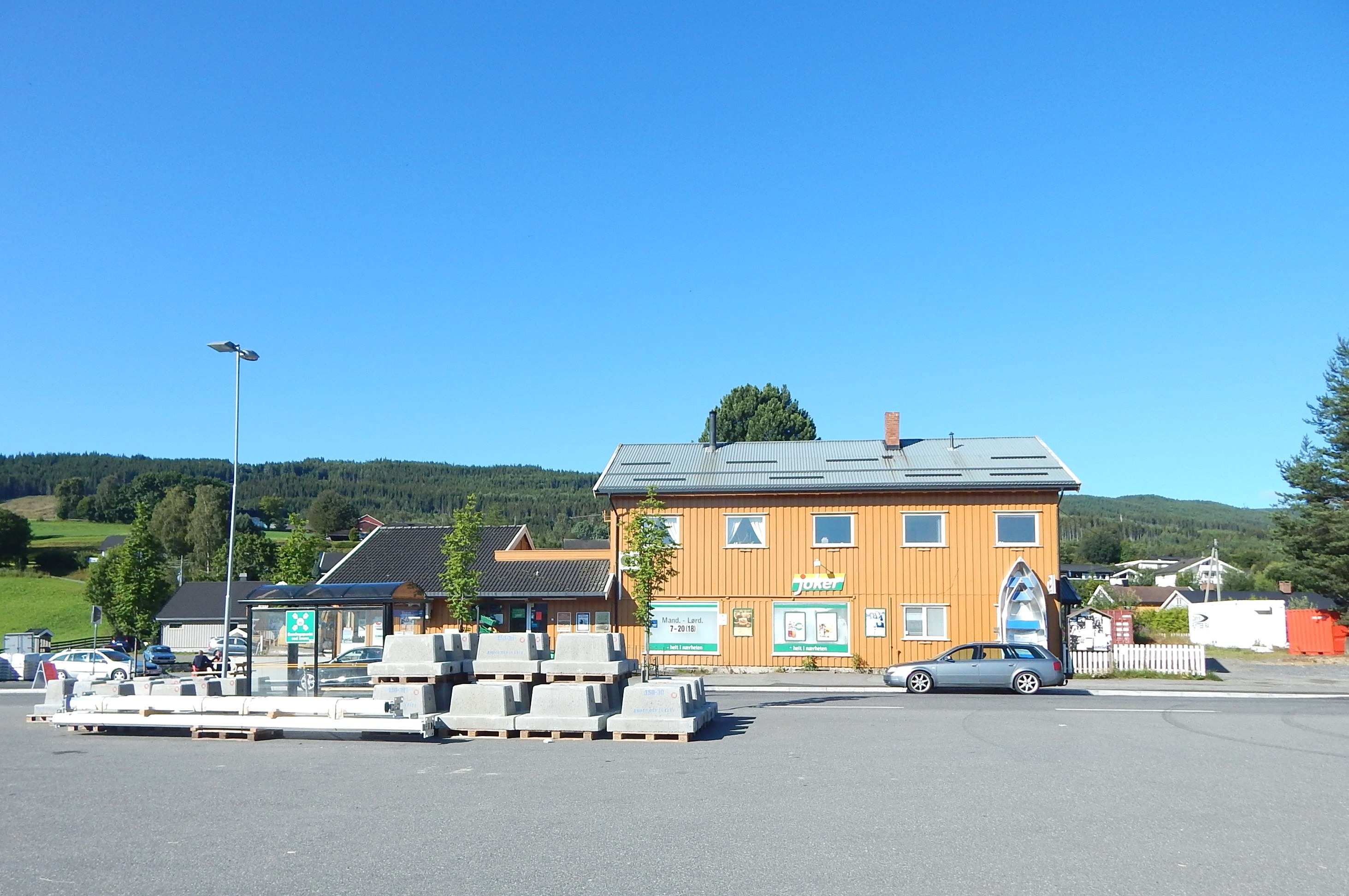
- View of the village
- Interactive map of Vingrom
- Location within Innlandet Location within Norway
- Coordinates: 61.04604°N 10.4296°E
- Country: Norway
- Region: Eastern Norway
- County: Innlandet
- District: Gudbrandsdalen
- Municipality: Lillehammer Municipality

Area
  - Total: 0.64 km^{2} (0.25 sq mi)
- Elevation: 134 m (440 ft)

Population (2024)
  - Total: 752
  - Density: 1,175/km^{2} (3,040/sq mi)
- Time zone: UTC+01:00 (CET)
  - Summer (DST): UTC+02:00 (CEST)
- Post Code: 2607 Vingrom

Vingrom is a village in Lillehammer Municipality in Innlandet county, Norway. The village is located along the lake Mjøsa, just north of the border with Gjøvik Municipality, and about 10 kilometres (6.2 mi) south of the town of Lillehammer. The European route E6 highway runs through the village. Vingrom Church lies about 3 kilometres (1.9 mi) north of the village.

The 0.64-square-kilometre (160-acre) village has a population (2024) of 752 and a population density of 1,175 inhabitants per square kilometre (3,040/sq mi).
