= Georg Reichwein Sr. =

German-born Norwegian military officer

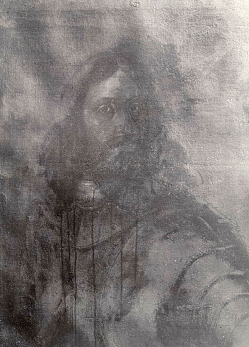
Georg Reichwein

Georg Reichwein Sr. (1593 – 5 May 1667) was a German born, Norwegian military officer.

== Biography ==
Born at Kassel in Hesse, he emigrated to Norway in 1628 as King Christian IV established the first standing army in Norway. In 1645, he assumed command of the Akershus Fortress Infantry Regiment in Christiania. In 1636, he became a captain at Bergenhus Fortress and the following year was promoted to major. In 1641, he was appointed lieutenant colonel in the Bergenhus Regiment. Reichwein was promoted to major general in 1659. In 1666, he was appointed to County Governor over Bergenhus len. He died during 1667 and was buried in Christiania.

Reichwein was noted for fighting from 1644 to 1645 in the Torstenson War that was ended by the Treaty of Brömsebro, from 1657 to 1658 in the Dano-Swedish War that was ended by the Treaty of Roskilde and from 1658 to 1660 in the Dano-Swedish War that was ended by the Treaty of Copenhagen. He was ennobled in 1655 and was a signatory of the 1661 Sovereignty Act as a representative of the noble estates of the realm.

His writings, dating from 1646 to 1657, are among the most important sources for assessing military conditions in Norway at that time.

Georg Reichwein was the father of Georg Reichwein (1630–1710) and grandfather of Lorentz Reichwein (1680–1735), both military officers.
