= Gårdsnummer =

The gårdsnummer or cadastral unit number is the number of a farm unit in the Norwegian land register and it serves as the assessor's parcel number. The modern abbreviation is Gnr, although the Norske Gaardnavne lists the abbreviation as GN. Each municipality will typically start with Gnr 1 and number each gård consecutively as needed.

A farm is often divided into bruksnummers, which begin again for each farm. This means that over time a larger farm has been divided into smaller units.

== Land register hierarchy ==
- - Fylkesnummer
  - - Kommunenummer
    - Gnr. – Gårdsnummer
      - Bnr. – Bruksnummer
        - Fnr. – Festenummer
        - Snr. – Seksjonsnummer
