= Weinrich =

Weinrich is a German surname. Notable people with the surname include:

- Agnes Weinrich (1873–1946), American artist
- Carl Weinrich (1904–1991), American organist
- Eric Weinrich (born 1966), American ice hockey player
- Georg von Weinrich (1768–1836), Bavarian Lieutenant General and War Minister
- Harald Weinrich (1927–2022), German classical scholar
- James D. Weinrich (born 1950), American sex researcher
- Jeth Weinrich (born 1961), Canadian music video director and documentary filmmaker
- Johannes Weinrich (born 1947), German left-wing activist and convicted terrorist
- Karl Weinrich (1887–1973), German NSDAP Gauleiter
- Lorenz Weinrich (1929–2025), German historian
- Scott Weinrich (born 1961), American musician
- Stephan Weinrich (born 1986), German politician

== See also ==
- Weinreich
