= Assessor's parcel number =

Identification number for a unit of real estate

An assessor's parcel number, or APN, is a number assigned to parcels of real property by the tax assessor of a particular jurisdiction for purposes of identification and record-keeping. The assigned number is unique within the particular jurisdiction, and may conform to certain formatting standards that convey basic identifying information such as the property type or location within the plot map.

In the United States, APNs are typically assigned by the local taxing authority, such as the city or county within which the property is located. Many taxing authorities will provide property tax information to the public, indexed by APN.

Alternative terms with the same meaning include:

- Assessor's identification number (AIN)
- Property identification number (PIN)
- Property identification (PID)
- Property account number
- Tax account number
- Sidwell number

The term or terms used in any particular jurisdiction are as determined by the authority assigning the numbers.

The terms lot and parcel are often used interchangeably, but they have different meanings. A parcel is an identification for taxation purposes, while a lot is a recognized subdivision of property with a written legal description that addresses permissions or constraints upon its development. It is possible for a parcel to have more than one lot.

APN numbers and the property boundaries that they describe have become particularly important for the oil and gas industry with recent discoveries of recoverable hydrocarbons in the Marcellus Shale and related geological formations. Because the geographic regions have no other land survey system (such as the US Public Land Survey System), parcels are the most reliable way to describe a particular area of land. This is especially important for the purpose of legally describing the area covered by an oil and gas lease.

The format of APN strings can vary, it is typically a concatenation of the book, page, parcel number. In New York State, they are called "SBL numbers" because they are a concatenation of the section, block, and lot numbers. https://www.tax.ny.gov/pit/property/star/sample-tax-bills.htm
