= Fåberg Church =

Church in Innlandet, Norway

- Fåberg kirke
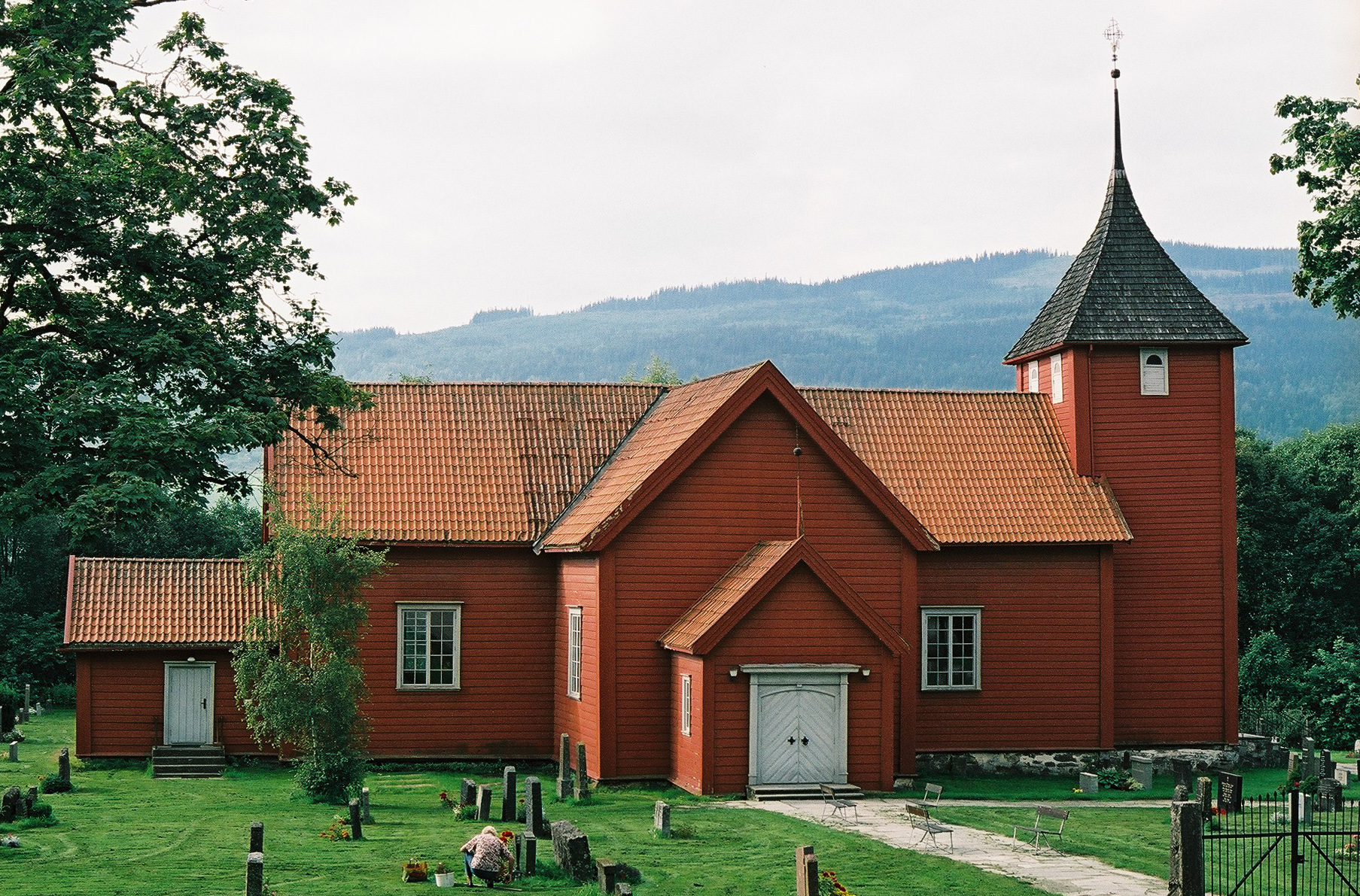
- View of the church
- Fåberg Church
- 61°09′37″N 10°22′18″E
- Location: Lillehammer, Innlandet
- Country: Norway
- Denomination: Church of Norway
- Previous denomination: Catholic Church
- Churchmanship: Evangelical Lutheran

History
- Status: Parish church
- Founded: 12th century
- Consecrated: 23 February 1727

Architecture
- Functional status: Active
- Architect: Svend Tråseth
- Architectural type: Long church
- Completed: 1727 (299 years ago)

Specifications
- Capacity: 292
- Materials: Wood

Administration
- Diocese: Hamar bispedømme
- Deanery: Sør-Gudbrandsdal prosti
- Parish: Fåberg
- Norwegian Cultural Heritage Site
- Type: Church
- Status: Automatically protected
- ID: 84224

Fåberg Church (Norwegian: Fåberg kirke) is a parish church of the Church of Norway in Lillehammer Municipality in Innlandet county, Norway. It is located in the village of Fåberg. It is the church for the Fåberg parish which is part of the Sør-Gudbrandsdal prosti (deanery) in the Diocese of Hamar. The red, wooden church was built in a cruciform design in 1727 using plans drawn up by the architect Svend Tråseth. The church seats about 292 people.

Next to the church stands the Fåberg stone, a runestone believed to have been one of three monoliths standing near the church.

The church can be reached via Norwegian County Road 255.

== History ==
The first church in Fåberg was a wooden stave church that was likely built in the second half of the 12th century. The church still contains a gravestone for the church's priest Paul Haakonsen who died in 1202, meaning the church was built before that time. In the 1630s, the church was renovated and partially rebuilt by the architect Werner Olsen. The nave was enlarged by adding transept wings to the north and south, creating a cruciform floor plan. It also received a new tower. At the church auction in 1723, the congregation itself bought the church from the King who was selling all churches to pay debts from the Great Northern War. At that time, discussions were already underway about replacing the old church as well as the location of a new church. After many discussions over the next year or so, it was decided to keep the same location, but build a new church.

In 1726, the old church was torn down and a new timber-framed cruciform church was constructed on the same site. Like most of the churches that were built in the 18th century in the Gudbrandsdalen valley, it was inspired by the cathedral in Oslo. Most churches at that time were built with a central tower, but this one was built with a tower on the west end. It is believed that the local architect Svend Tråseth designed the church. He later built several other churches in Gudbrandsdal and Valdres. The new church was consecrated on 23 February 1727 by the Bishop. Several interior furnishings were moved from the old church including the baptismal font carved from soapstone from the 1100s, a gravestone from 1202, and one of the medieval church bells. Two doors from the old stave church were preserved at the Museum of Cultural History in Christiania. A medieval crucifix from the stave church was moved to a museum at Maihaugen. The old alms box from the church, dating from 1668, was also moved to the Garmo Stave Church at Maihaugen.

In 1748, the church received exterior paneling, it was painted reddish brown with white window frames, and the roof was tarred. In 1810, a painting by the Fåberg artist Ole Larsen Smerud was gifted to the church. It is a painting of Jesus on the cross and it was hung above the altar in the church. Smerud studied painting in Copenhagen, where he worked as a court painter and heraldic artist.

In 1814, this church served as an election church (Norwegian: valgkirke). Together with more than 300 other parish churches across Norway, it was a polling station for elections to the 1814 Norwegian Constituent Assembly which wrote the Constitution of Norway. This was Norway's first national elections. Each church parish was a constituency that elected people called "electors" who later met together in each county to elect the representatives for the assembly that was to meet at Eidsvoll Manor later that year.

Most dramatic for the church's appearance was a modernization effort in 1884. Then the interior walls were paneled and painted white, and the interior was "simplified". Much of the interior artwork was stored away, a good deal of it was sold or disposed of. The outside of the church was also painted white.

During other restorations from 1927 to the end of the 1950s, the interior and furniture were largely restored to its appearance before the 1884 modernization. The interior paneling was removed, some of the damaged furniture was found and was put back in place. A baptismal sacristy was built in 1901. In 1972, the church exterior was painted red. In 2007, the local newspaper reported about rot problems in the church, and shortly afterwards reported that money had been allocated for repairs.

== Fåberg parish ==
Historically, the Fåberg parish name has varied in its spelling: Fogaberg, Faberg, Foberg, Fauberg, and Faaberg and these spellings date back as early as 1300. The parish of Fåberg was established as Fåberg Municipality on 1 January 1838 (see Formannskapsdistrikt law). The municipality was merged into Lillehammer Municipality on 1 January 1964. The database for Norske Gaardnavne lists Gårdsnummer 99-188 for Fåberg parish in Fåberg municipality. The Matrikkelutkastet av 1950 lists Gårdsnummer 1-191 as part of Fåberg because Fåberg Municipality included all of Lillehammer Municipality at that time. The records after 1964 list Gårdsnummer 1-191 as part of Lillehammer Municipality instead of Fåberg because of the 1964 change.

The online parish records for Fåberg start in 1727 for Fåberg Prestegjeld and in 1901 for Lillehammer Prestegjeld at Digitalarkivet. The attached KML file shows the church location and the farm locations in Gnr/Bnr format.

== Media gallery ==
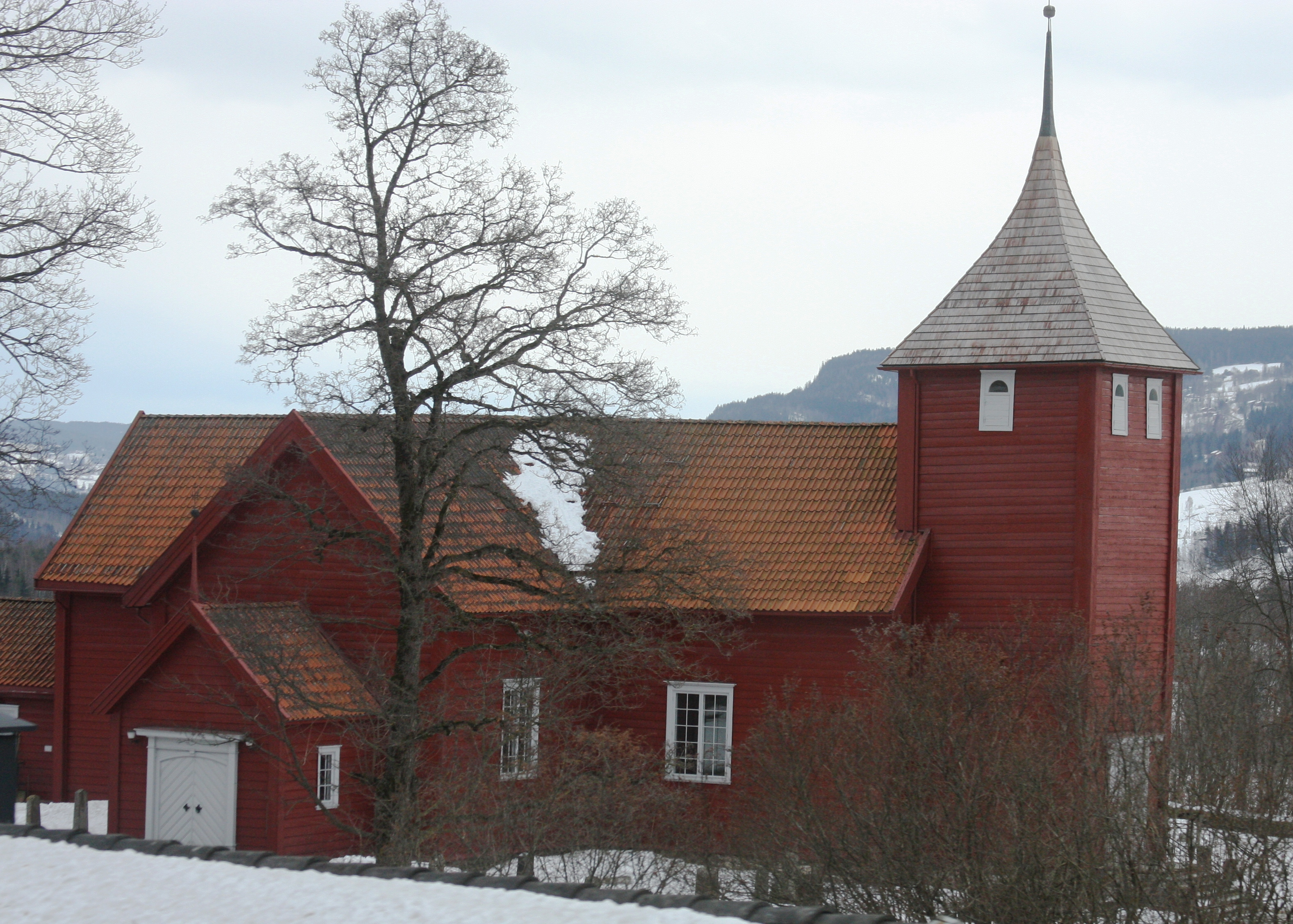

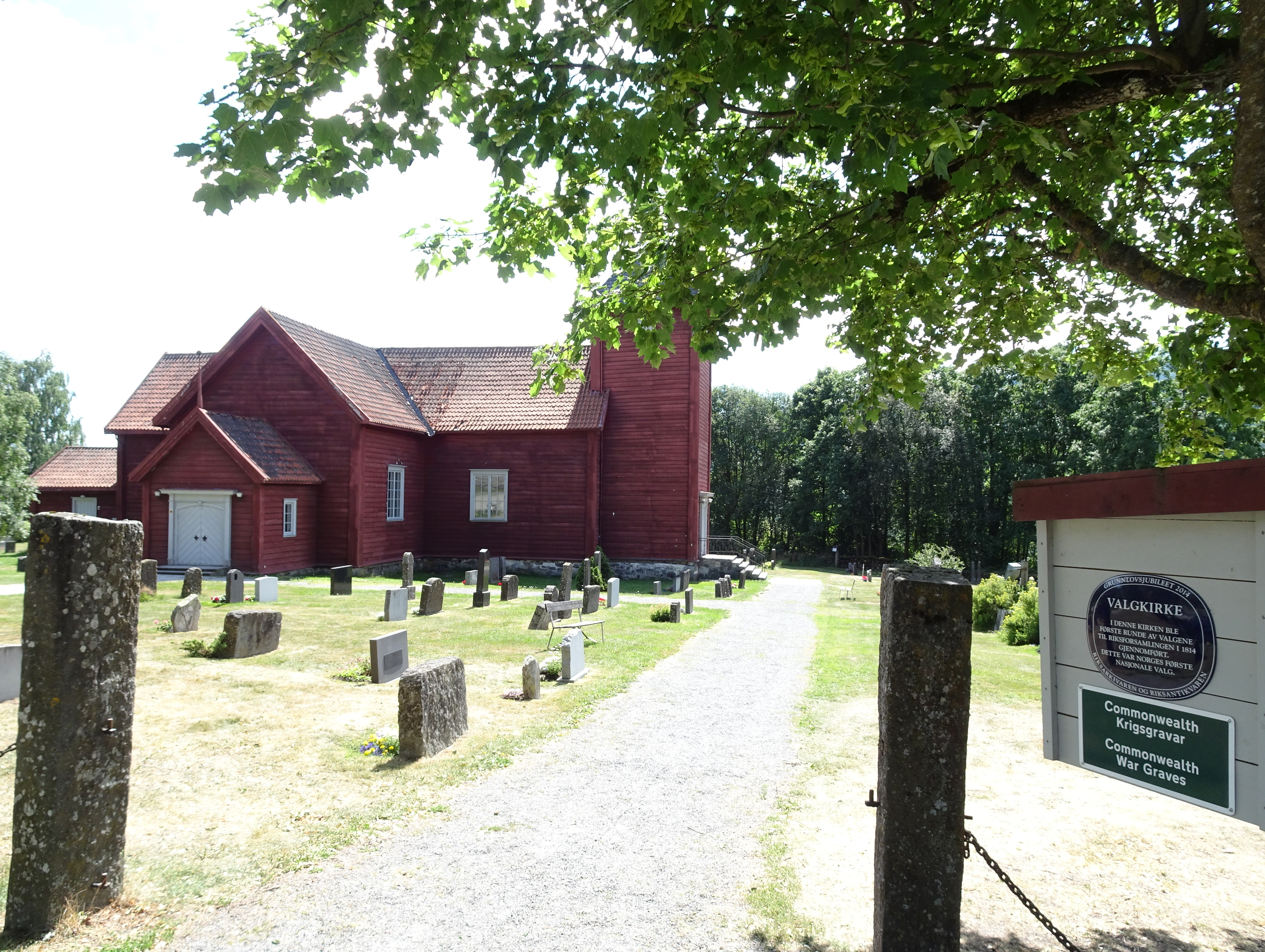

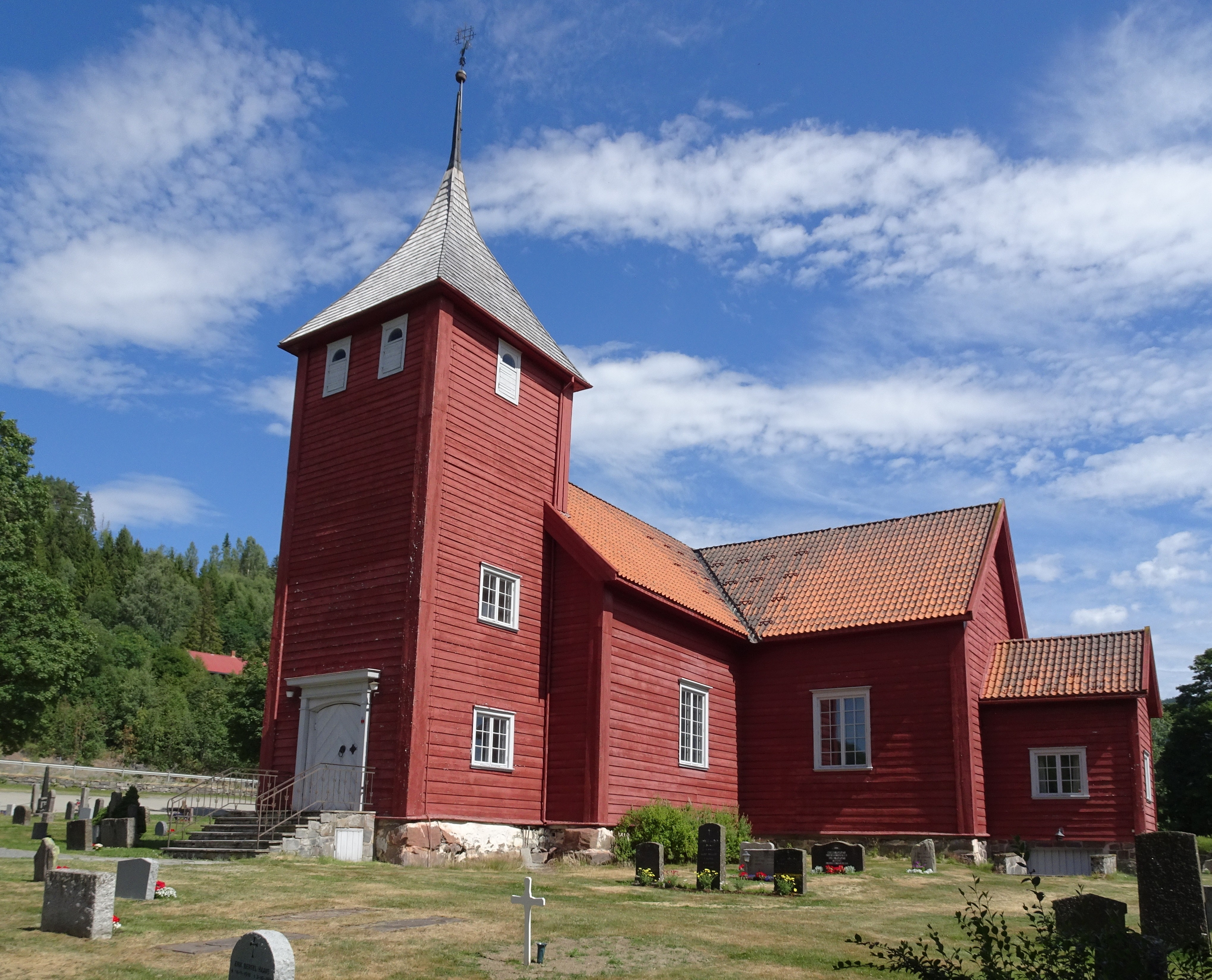

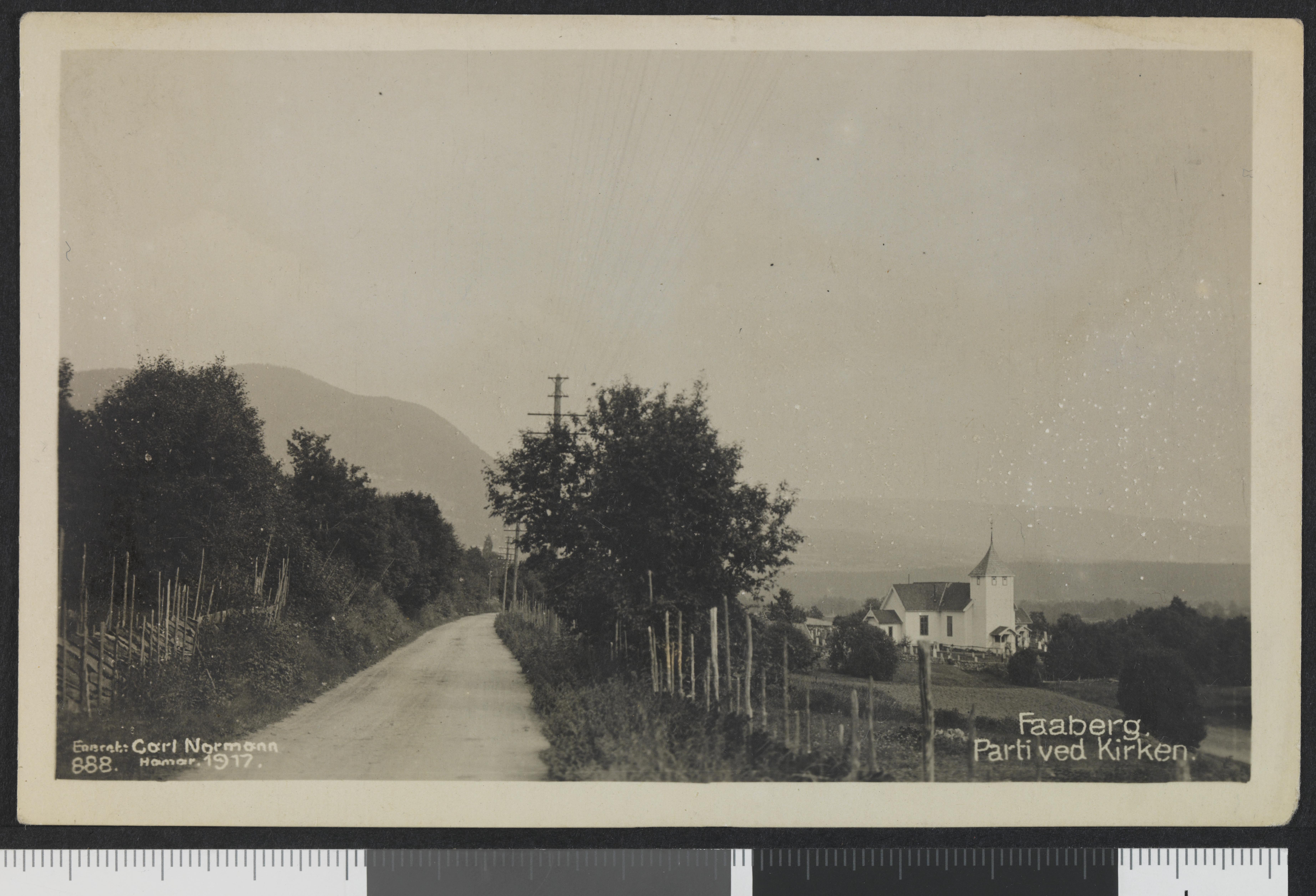

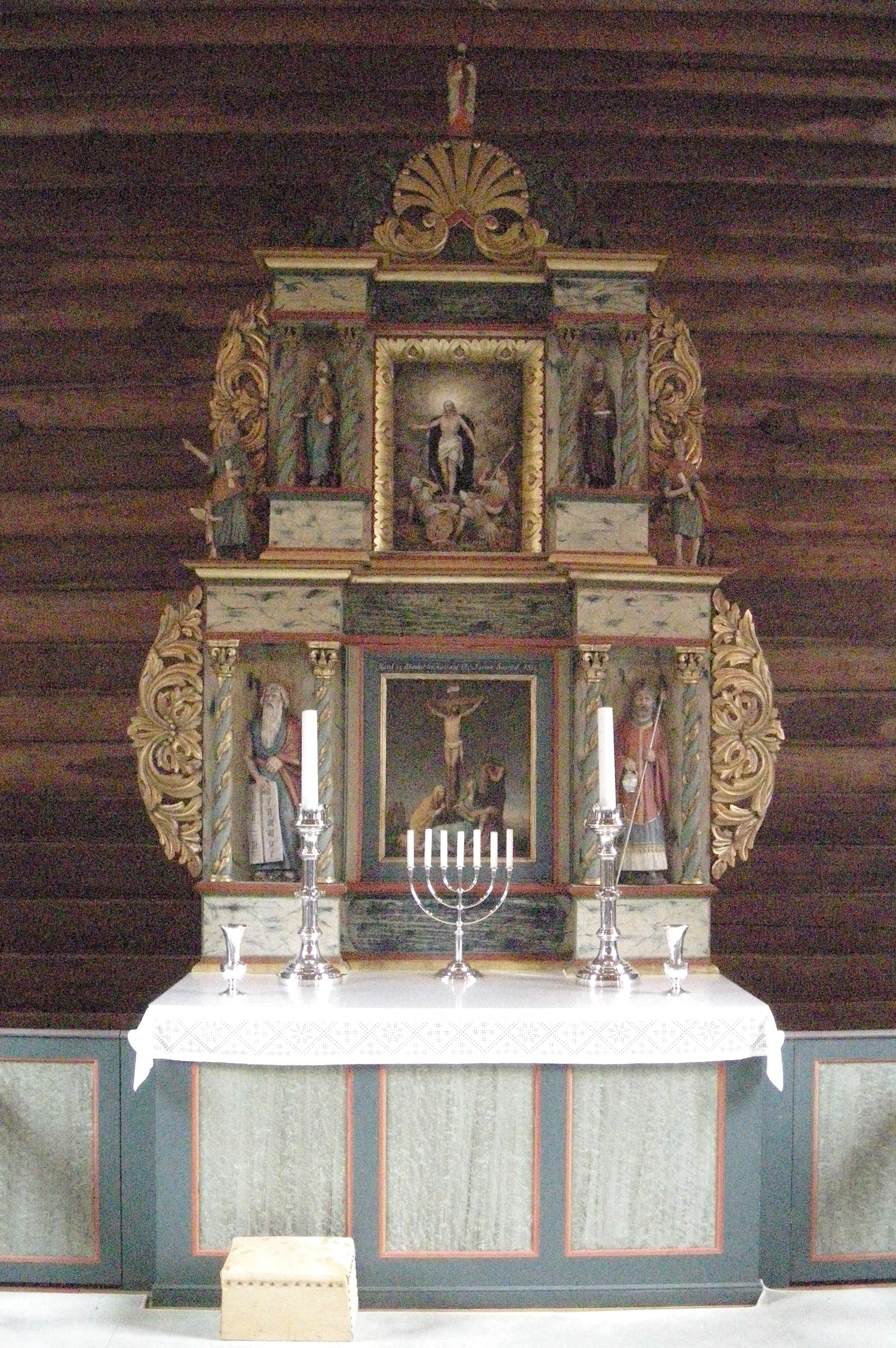

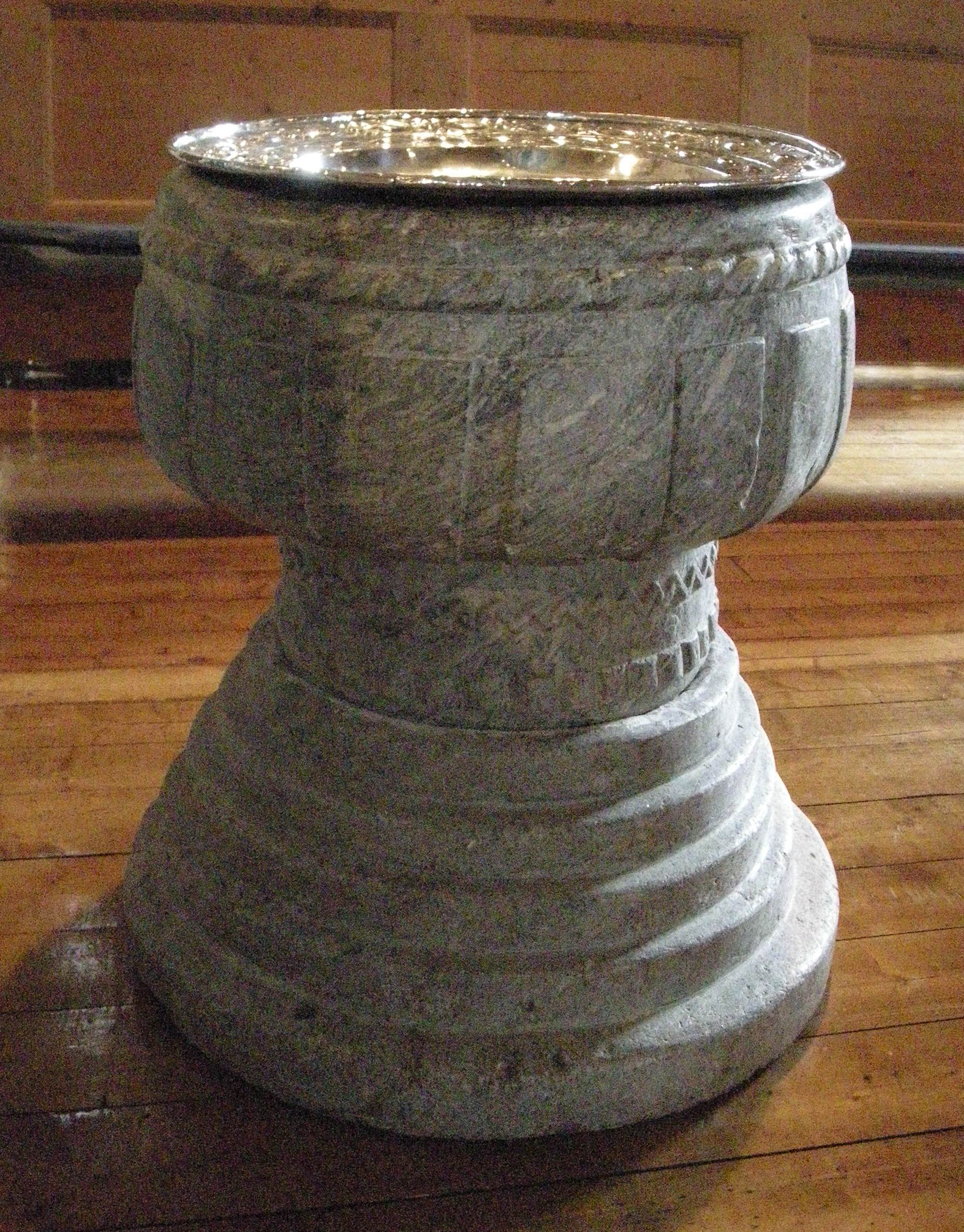

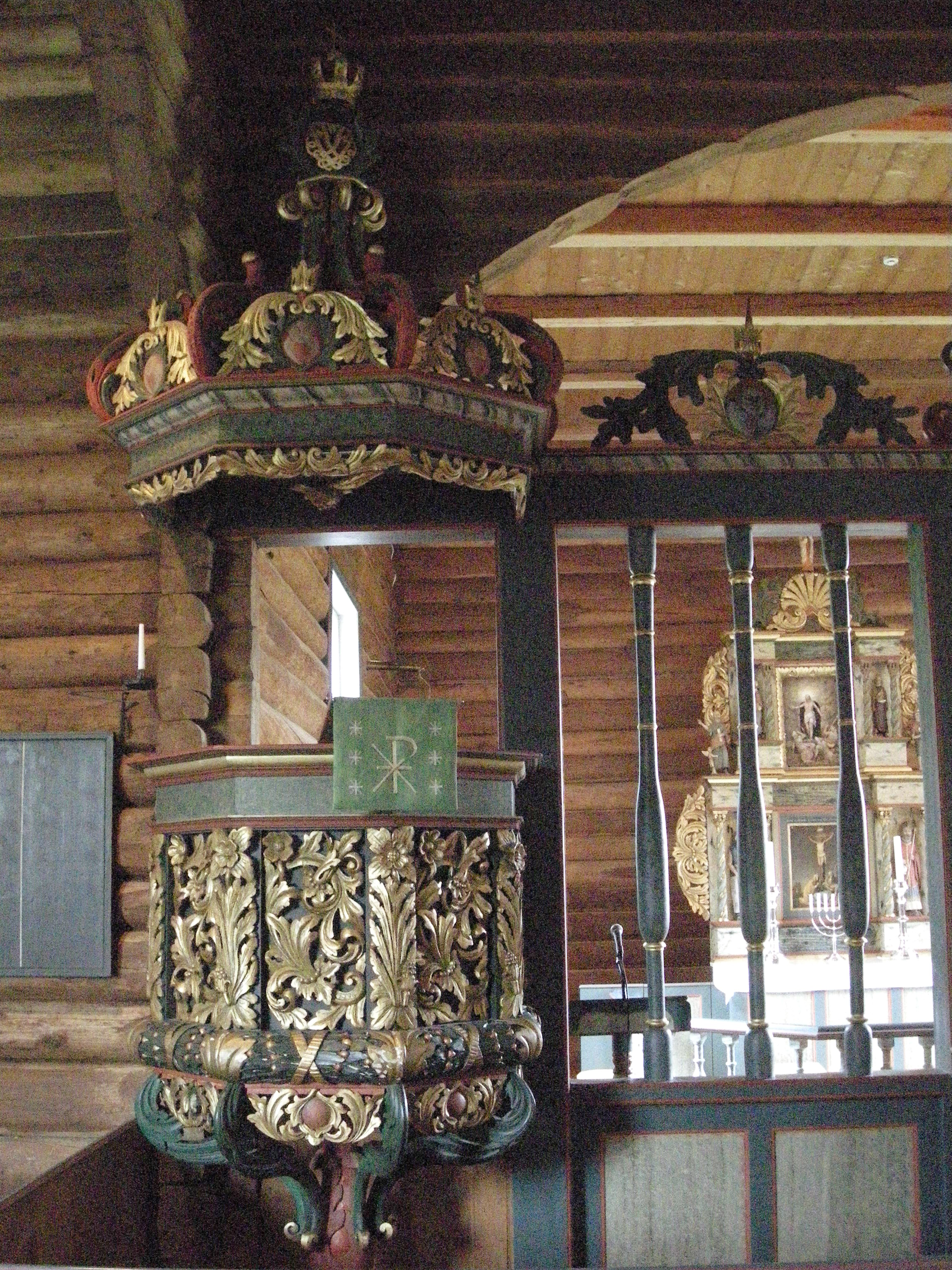

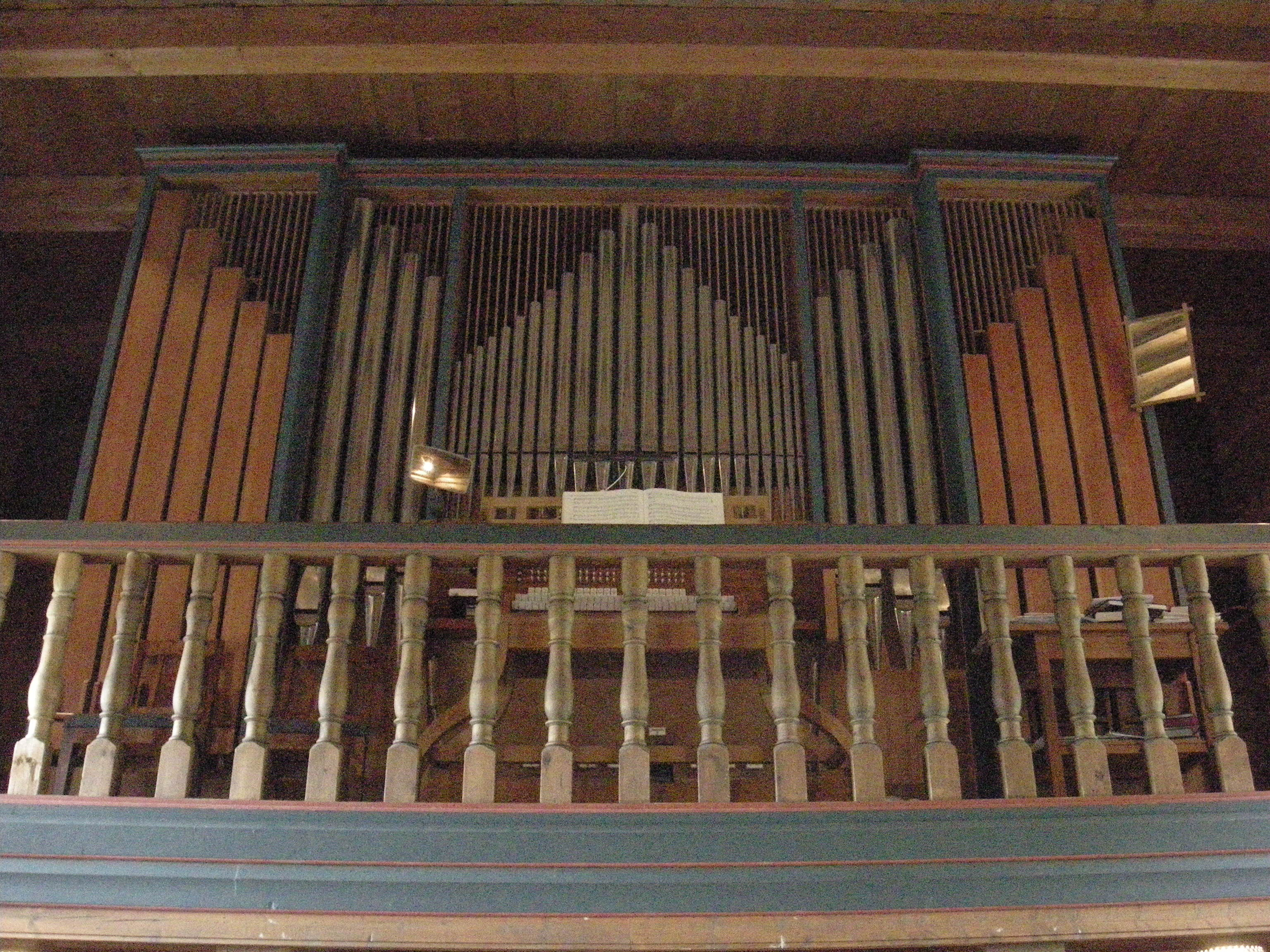

== See also ==
- List of churches in Hamar
