= Fåberg (village) =

Village in Lillehammer Municipality, Norway

- Village
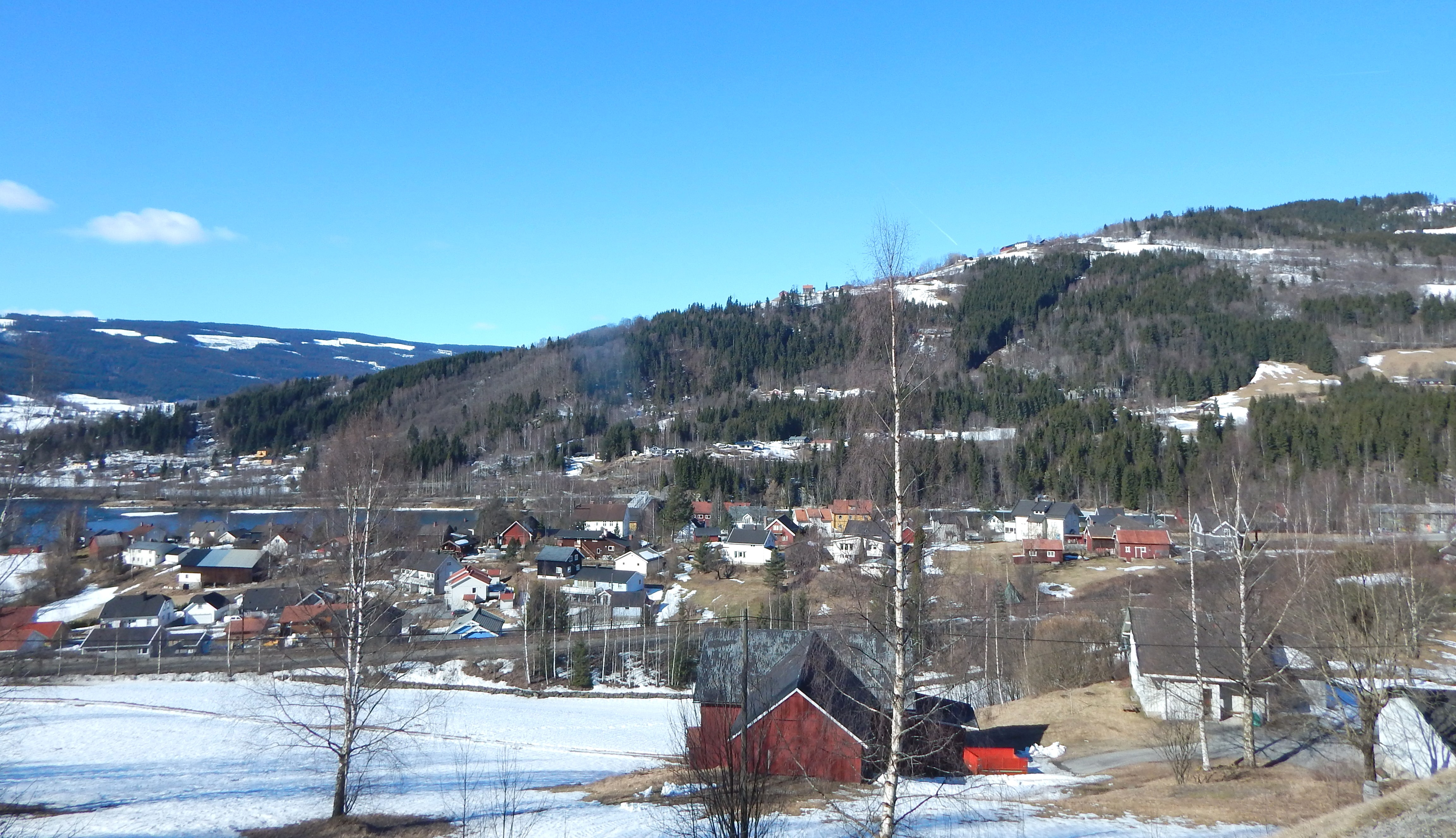
- View of the village
- Interactive map of Fåberg
- Location within Innlandet Location within Norway
- Coordinates: 61.16836°N 10.40479°E
- Country: Norway
- Region: Eastern Norway
- County: Innlandet
- District: Gudbrandsdalen
- Municipality: Lillehammer Municipality

Area
  - Total: 0.52 km^{2} (0.20 sq mi)
- Elevation: 155 m (509 ft)

Population (2024)
  - Total: 682
  - Density: 1,312/km^{2} (3,400/sq mi)
- Time zone: UTC+01:00 (CET)
  - Summer (DST): UTC+02:00 (CEST)
- Post Code: 2625 Fåberg

Fåberg is a village within the bigger rural area with the same name, Fåberg, located in the northern, eastern and western part of Lillehammer Municipality in Innlandet county, Norway. The village is located in the Gudbrandsdalen valley, along the shore of the Gudbrandsdalslågen river. The town of Lillehammer lies about 5 kilometres (3.1 mi) to the southeast of Fåberg and the village of Jorstadmoen lies about 3 kilometres (1.9 mi) to the southwest of Fåberg. The European route E6 highway and the Dovrebanen railway line both run through the village. The historic Fåberg Church lies a short distance west of the village, on the other side of the river.

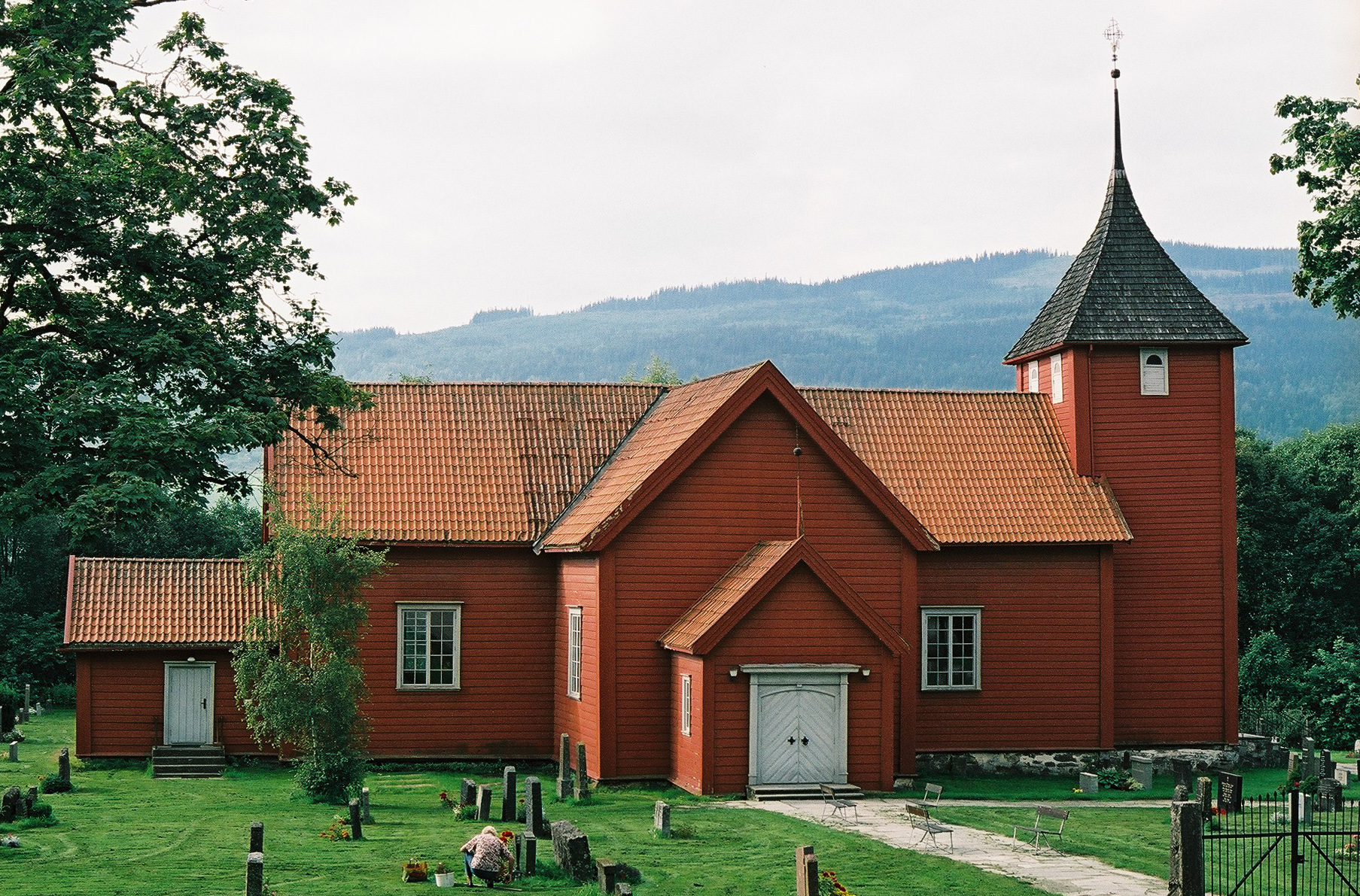
Fåberg Church

The 0.52-square-kilometre (130-acre) village has a population (2024) of 682 and a population density of 1,312 inhabitants per square kilometre (3,400/sq mi).

== History ==
From 1838 to 1964, the village of Fåberg was the administrative centre of the old Fåberg Municipality. In 1964, the old municipality was merged into Lillehammer Municipality.

=== Name ===
The village was named after the nearby Fåberg farm (Old Norse: Fágaberg) because the first Fåberg Church was built there. The meaning of the first element is unknown. The last element is berg which means "mountain". On 21 December 1917, a royal resolution enacted the 1917 Norwegian language reforms. Prior to this change, the name was spelled Faaberg with the digraph "aa", and after this reform, the name was spelled Fåberg, using the letter å instead.
