= Begna, Norway =

Village in Sør-Aurdal Municipality, Norway

Begna Begna bruk
- Village
- Interactive map of Begna
- Location within Innlandet Location within Norway
- Coordinates: 60.64399°N 9.88131°E
- Country: Norway
- Region: Eastern Norway
- County: Innlandet
- District: Valdres
- Municipality: Sør-Aurdal Municipality
- Elevation: 170 m (560 ft)
- Time zone: UTC+01:00 (CET)
  - Summer (DST): UTC+02:00 (CEST)
- Post Code: 2937 Begna

Begna or Begna bruk is a village in Sør-Aurdal Municipality in Innlandet county, Norway. The village is located in the Begnadalen valley, along the north shore of the river Begna, about 30 kilometres (19 mi) to the southeast of the village of Bagn which is the municipal centre of Sør-Aurdal. The European route E16 highway runs along the southern shore of the river, accessible by a nearby bridge. The village lies about 1 kilometre (0.62 mi) to the northwest of the municipal (and county) border. Ringerike Municipality lies on the other side of the border.

The village is the site of a large sawmill which is the largest industrial site in Valdres. The sawmill sells about 200 million kr worth of lumber each year.
