= Storbrofos Træsliperi =

Norwegian wood pulp company

- Company type: Industrial company
- Industry: Wood pulp
- Founded: 1909
- Defunct: 1942
- Fate: Closed in favor of power production
- Headquarters: Bagn, Sør-Aurdal, Oppland, Norway
- Products: Wood pulp

Storbrofos Træsliperi was an industrial company that produced wood pulp at Bagn in Sør-Aurdal. The company was established in 1909, the factory was put into operation in 1911, and it closed in 1942.

== History ==
Storbrofos Træsliperi was established in 1909 during the last wave of mill foundings in the Drammen watercourse. The farmer Peder Piltingsrud took the initiative, seeing great possibilities for an industrial company in the area after the Valdres Line was built. Before construction of a power-intensive mill could begin, it was necessary to secure rights in the Storbrofossen waterfall in the Begna river; one side of the waterfall was bought by Louise Bang and the other by Hans Erlandsen. With the power secured, construction could begin, and in time 80 men were engaged in building the mill. Myrens Verksted supplied all the equipment, and the plant was ready in 1911.

Only half a year after start-up the plant burned. Piltingsrud rebuilt it and resumed wood pulp production in 1912. As operations settled, a normal year saw 15,000 tonnes of wood pulp produced at Storbrofos. The plant was sized to produce 18,000 tonnes across eight grinding machines and four board machines. The board machines were used as take-up machines for the wood pulp, so that it could be dewatered and then cut into sheets. The pulp bales were carried on a cableway about two kilometers long up to Tonsåsen station on the Valdres Line, where the company had its own siding with a warehouse.

The waterfall, Storbrofossen, gave the plant a stable supply of power. The other key resource, timber, could also be obtained locally, as Piltingsrud was himself a forest owner, having inherited the forests from his father, who had carried on extensive timber trading. This was not enough to cover the plant's annual needs, however, and timber was bought from other forest properties in Valdres.

Stable production depended on a secure supply of labor, and as in many "mill communities," the workforce was largely recruited locally. The permanent workforce at Storbrofos was between 60 and 70 employees. The first years were calm, but Piltingsrud was not in favor of either trade unions or collective agreements. After the workers demanded a pay increase in 1930, a strike broke out that proved costly for both parties.

Hans Andreas Næss of Hønefoss eventually came in as owner and operator of the company. Næss had already established Storbrofos Træsliperis Tømmerkontor in 1933 to buy and sell timber for the mill, and in July 1937 the mill was registered with the district recorder's company register with Næss as manager and dominant owner. During the Second World War the mill suffered considerable damage, and an assessment held on 1 July 1940 put the damage at over 15,400 kroner.

Næss sold the mill in 1941 to the owners of Lillehammer Dampsag for 362,000 kroner, and it was later sold again. Seven municipalities in Oppland joined to develop power at Storbrofossen, the venture carried out in close cooperation with Vest-Oppland kommunale kraftselskap. The wood pulp business ceased, and the old firm Storbrofos Træsliperi was dissolved on 10 February 1942.

== Bibliography ==
- Hermundstad, Knut, ed. (1964). Valdres Bygdebok. Næringsvegane. Valdres, pp. 453–455.
- Kaldal, Ingar (1989). Papirarbeidernes historie. Norsk Papirindustriarbeiderforbund 1913–1988. Oslo, p. 60.
- Papir-Journalen, unsigned articles in nos. 15, 18, and 23, 1941.
