= Begnadalen =

Valley in Innlandet, Norway

- Begndalen (unofficial)
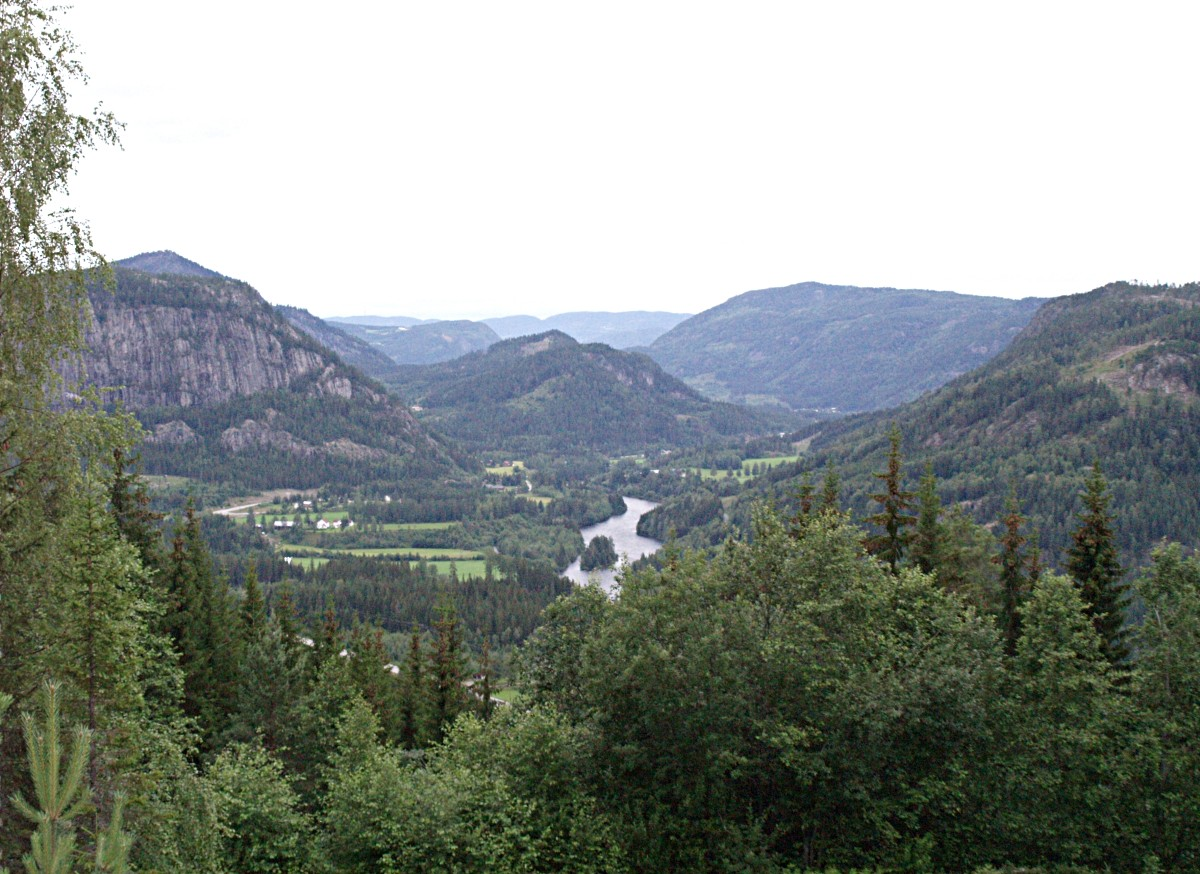
- Length: 45 kilometres (28 mi) NW-SE

Geology
- Type: River valley

Geography
- Location: Innlandet, Norway
- Coordinates: 60°40′N 09°45′E
- River: Begna

Location
- Interactive map of the valley

Begnadalen is a valley in Norway. The valley runs through Sør-Aurdal Municipality in Innlandet county and Ringerike Municipality in Buskerud county. The 45-kilometre (28 mi) long valley follows the river Begna from Bagn to the lake Sperillen. The European route E16 passes through the valley. In the central part of the valley, the Church of Norway has a church which is called the Begnadalen Church.

The main Begnadalen valley has several smaller side valleys that branch off of it. The Hedalen valley extends to the south and west of the main valley. The Vidalen extends to the south of the Hedalen valley and the Vassfaret valley extends to the west of the Hedalen valley.
