= Vassfaret =

Valley in Innlandet, Norway

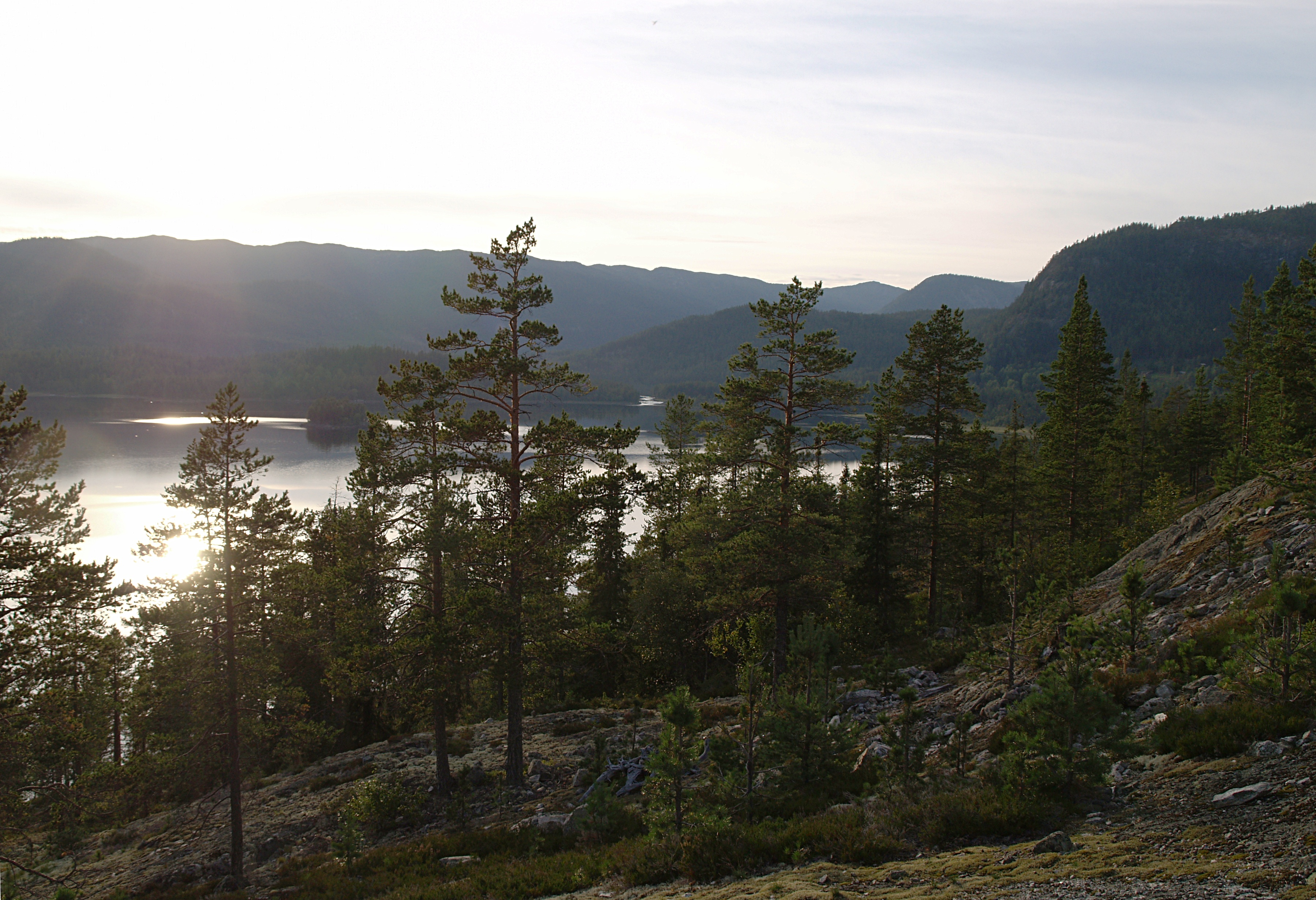
- View of Nevlingen river in the Vassfaret valley

Geology
- Type: River valley

Geography
- Location: Innlandet and Buskerud, Norway
- Coordinates: 60.5345°N 9.4895°E

Location
- Interactive map of the valley

Vassfaret is a forested mountain valley in southern Norway. The valley is located on the border of Flå Municipality, Nesbyen Municipality, and Ringerike Municipality in Buskerud county and Sør-Aurdal Municipality in Innlandet county. The valley lies between the Hallingdal and Hedalen valleys in the traditional district of Valdres. The steep forest and mountain slopes on both sides of the valley have peaks reaching up to 1,284 metres (4,213 ft) above sea level at Sørbølfjellet in Flå Municipality in the furthest southwest part of Vassfaret. The area was once heavily inhabited by bears.

== Protected area ==
The valley includes several nature conservation areas:

- Vassfaret and Vidalen conservation area (Vassfaret/Vidalen landskapsvernområde) covering 200 square kilometres (77 sq mi)
- Inner Vassfaret conservation area (Indre Vassfaret landskapsvernområde), covering 42 square kilometres (16 sq mi)
- There are also 9 small nature reserves, a total of 18 square kilometres (6.9 sq mi) with very strict protection rules.

== History ==
Vassfaret is characterized by low alpine coniferous forests, heather, and bogs. Down in the lower valley, there are a number of lakes surrounded by forest. In the higher elevations on either side of the valley, the mountains are rocky and weather beaten. The whole valley is not more than about 30 kilometres (19 mi) long. People have worked with logging and timber floating for more than 300 years in this valley. There has been human activity in Vassfaret as early as the times before the Black Death in 1349. In later ages, there were permanent settlements until 1921, when the last inhabitants left. In all, there are remnants of 12 farms in the valley as well as remnants of some mountain farms in the higher elevations. Numerous artifacts from the logging days are left in the valley including dams, walls constructed by stones out in the rivers, and runs to get the logs past troublesome spots.

From 1940-1945 during World War II, especially in the later years of the war, there was intense military activity in Vassfaret. This was the operational base a Resistance group code-named "ELG", and because of this there were many parachute drops there. There are still missing airdrops in the area.

By royal decree on 28 June 1985, the Vassfaret and Vidalen valleys were made into a protected area. The intention was to preserve the characteristic flora and fauna of eastern Norway, especially as an area for bears, and for the cultural remains from logging and floating. A special area covering cultural protection covers about 8 square kilometres (3.1 sq mi) within the Inner Vassfaret landscape protection area. Within this area there is logging by the old methods, and the logs are transported by horse. Every spring the logs are floated downstream into the Nevlingen river.

=== Vassfarplassen ===
At the northern end of the Nevlingen river, there are the remains of a farm called Vassfarplassen, where the farmer owned a gun that was nicknamed Vassfarloven, which means "The Law of Vassfaret". In the olden days, it is said that the people of Vassfaret were not very welcoming. A special internal relationship existed in the valley, but anyone coming from the neighbouring valleys would not expect a friendly welcome. This was especially true when it came to fishing within the valley. The saying was that in the middle of river there was a shallow area; you could row to that point, but if you got any closer, then you were within range of "The Law of Vassfaret" and the owner of that rifle was an excellent marksman, so fishermen had to be wary that they did not got too close.

== Authors writing about Vassfaret ==
There are several authors who have written about the area:

- Mikkjel Fønhus
- Per Hohle
- Bjarne Rønning
- Edvard Elsrud

== Gallery ==
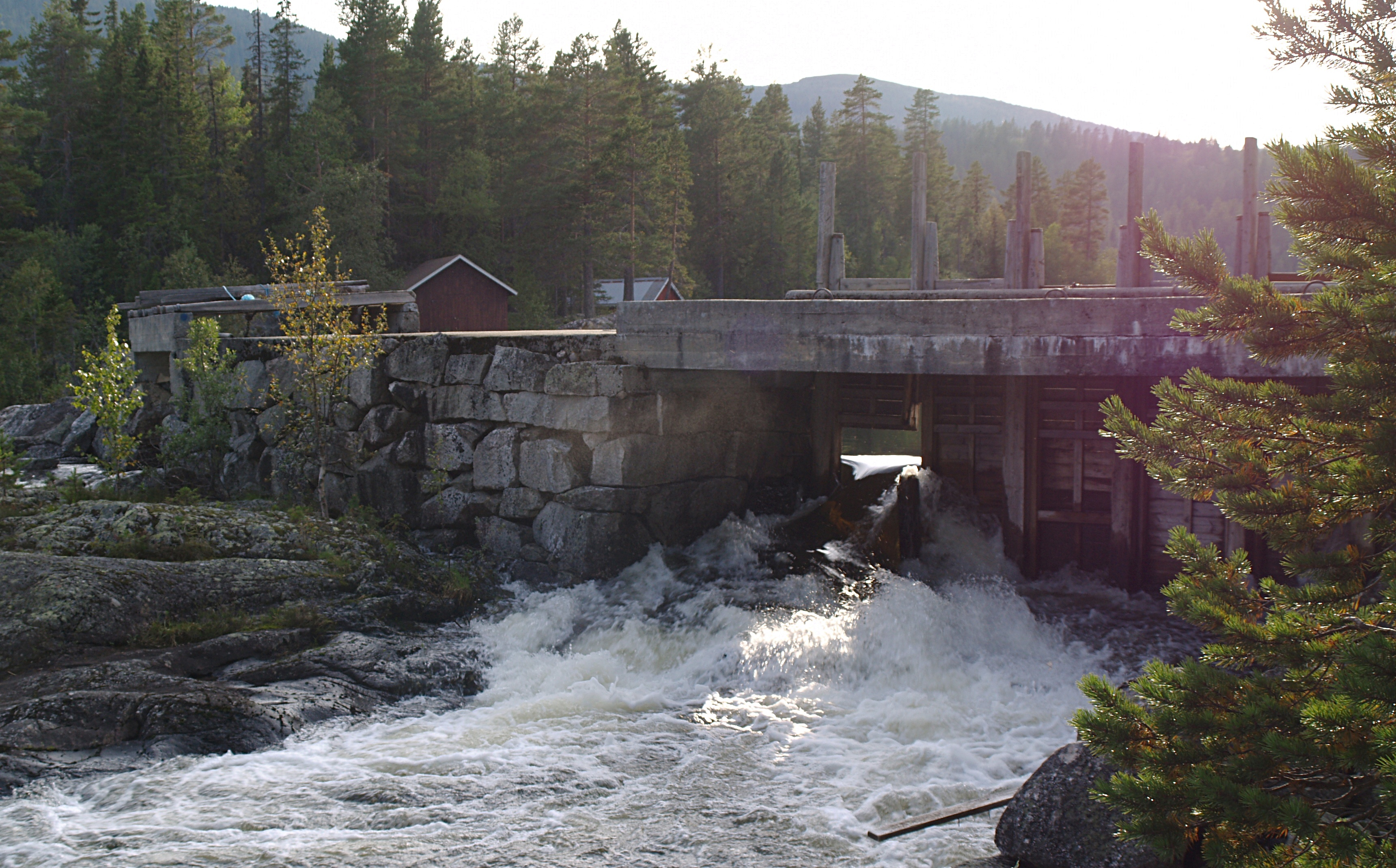
Nevlingdammen research facility on the Nevlingen River

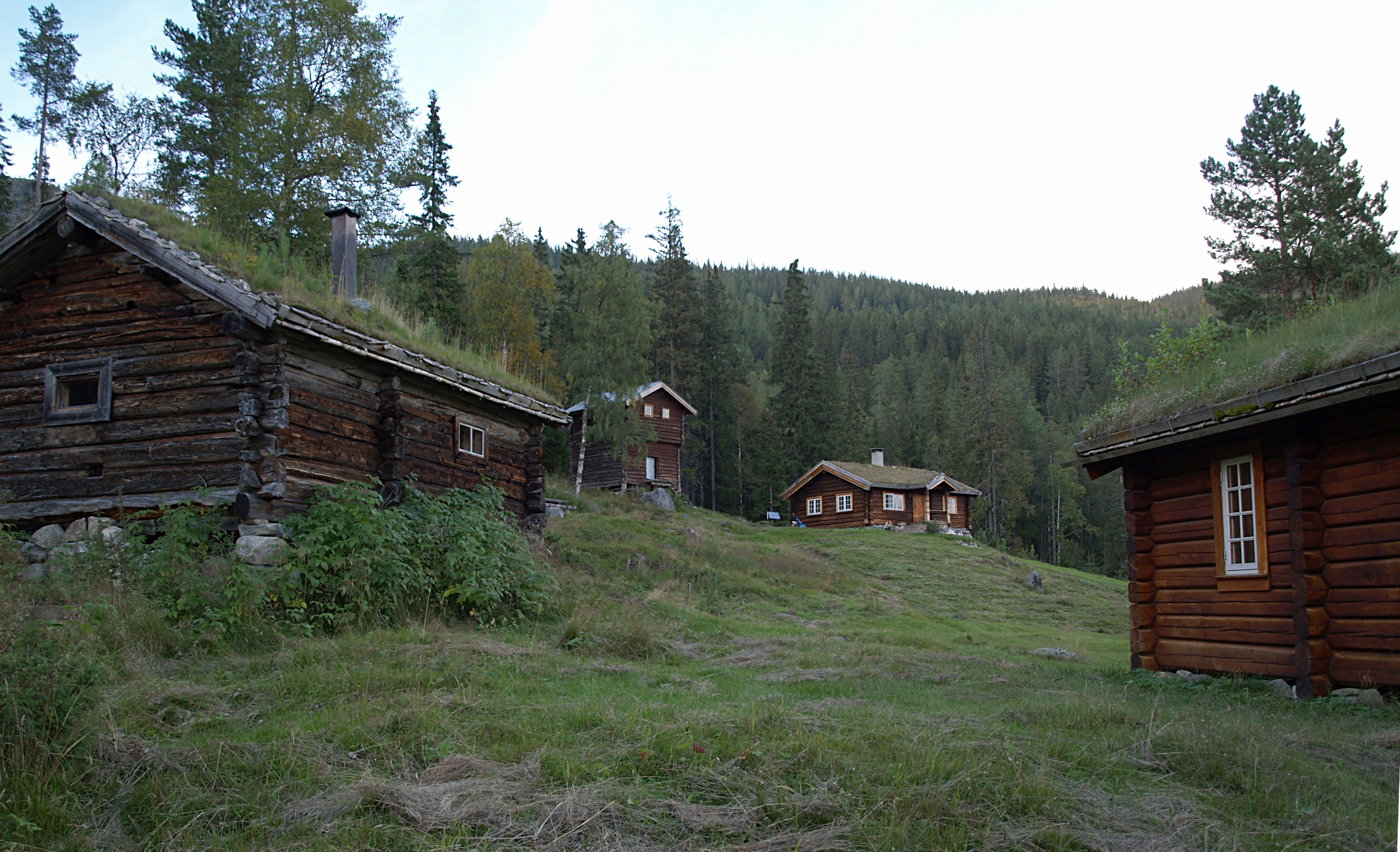
Reconstructed parts of Vassfarplassen

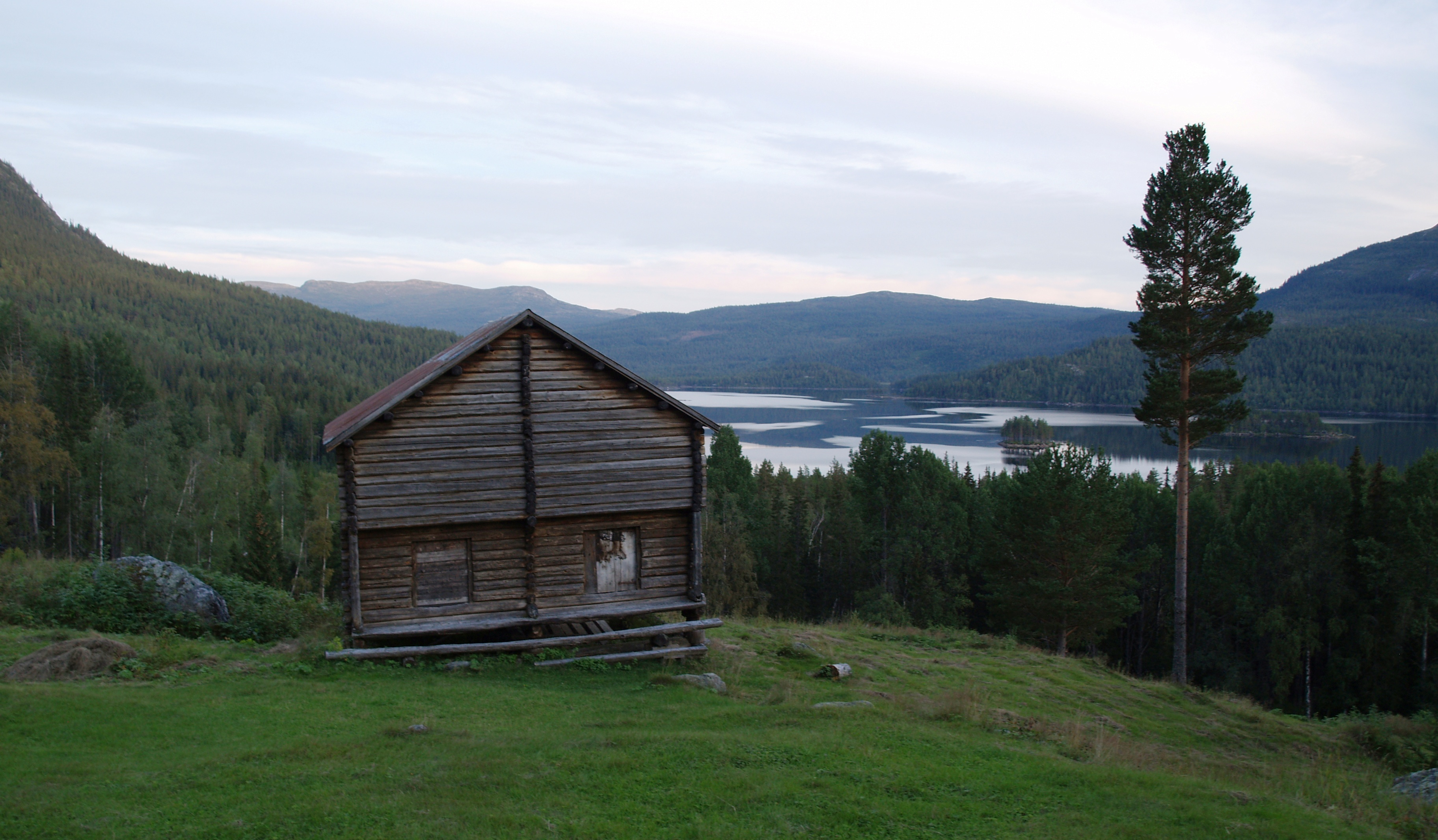
View from Vassfarplassen

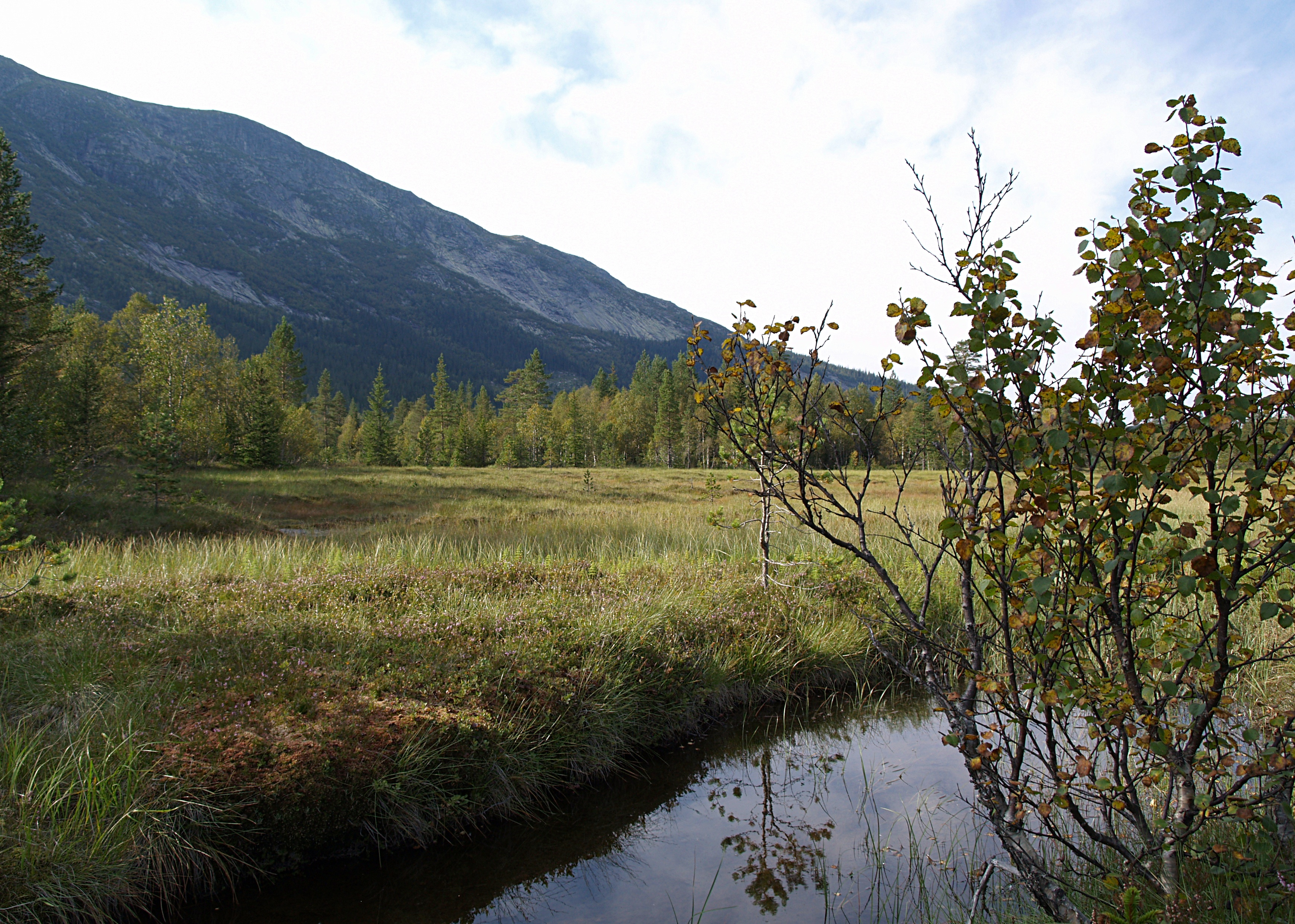
Vidalen

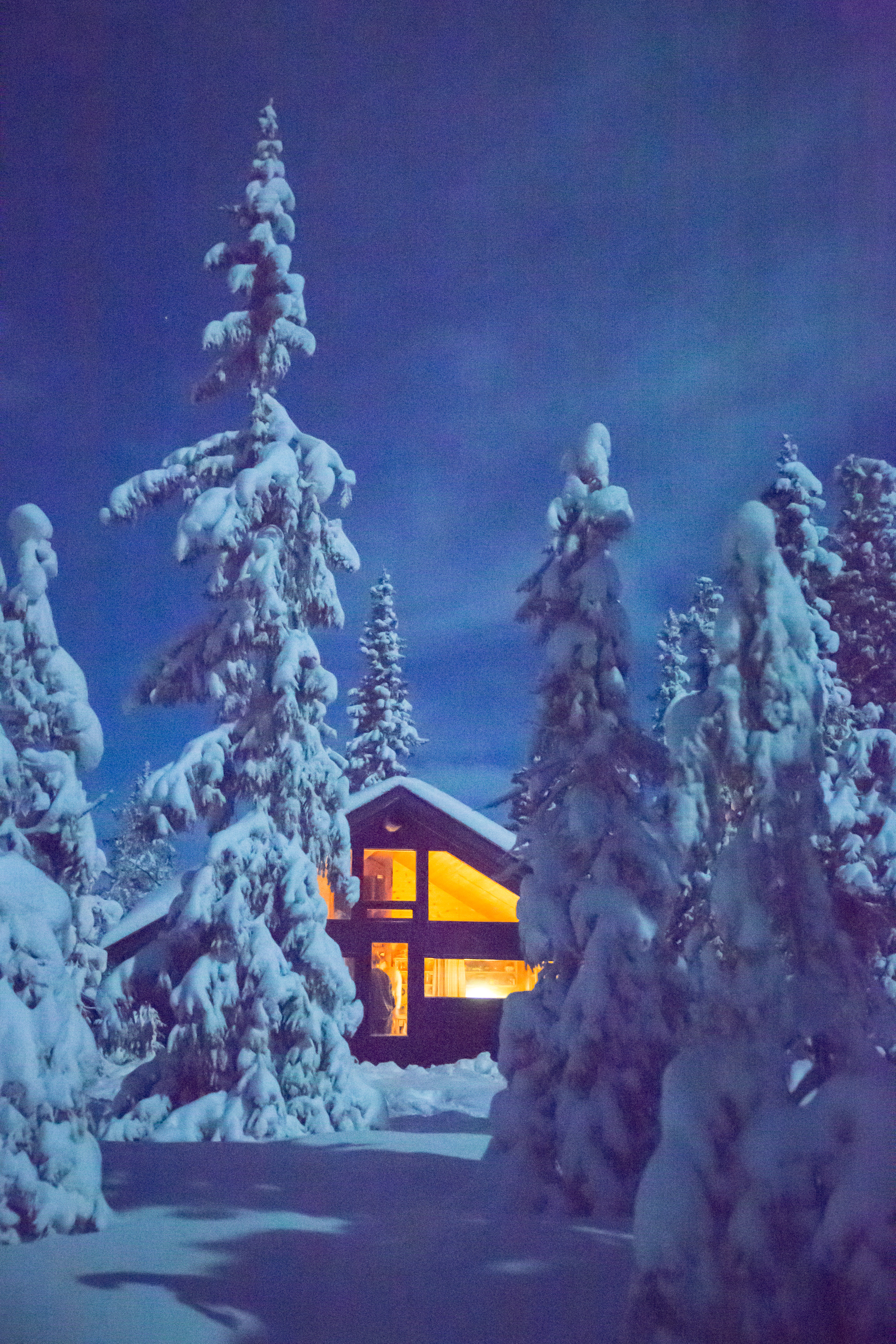
Winterlandscape in Vassfaret
