= Leirskogen Church =

Church in Innlandet, Norway

- Leirskogen kyrkje
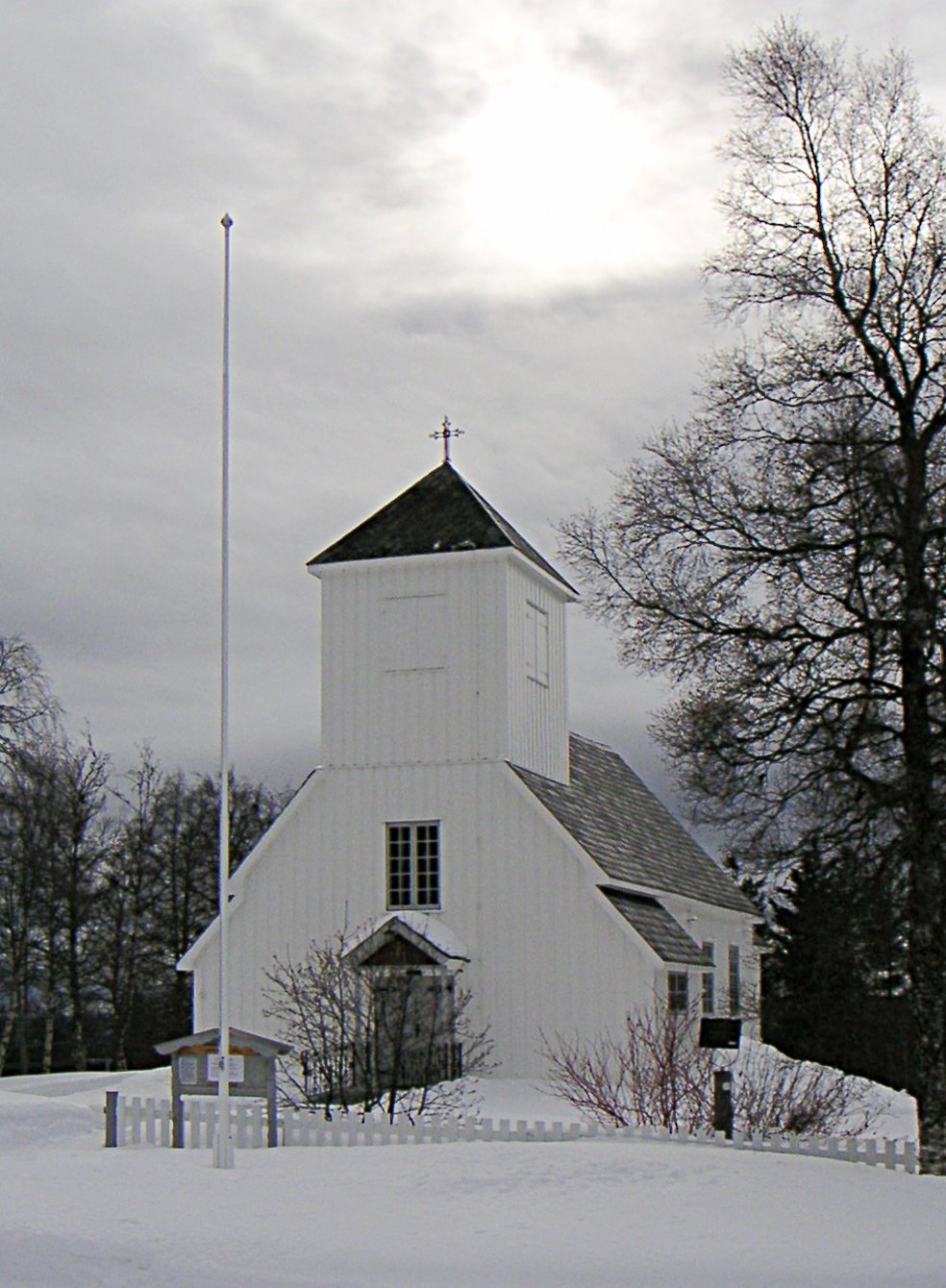
- View of the church Credit: John Erling Blad
- Leirskogen Church
- 60°47′52″N 9°40′56″E
- Location: Sør-Aurdal, Innlandet
- Country: Norway
- Denomination: Church of Norway
- Churchmanship: Evangelical Lutheran

History
- Status: Parish church
- Founded: 1924
- Consecrated: 18 March 1924

Architecture
- Functional status: Active
- Architect: Bakken og Grimsgaard
- Architectural type: Long church
- Completed: 1924 (102 years ago)

Specifications
- Capacity: 90
- Materials: Wood

Administration
- Diocese: Hamar bispedømme
- Deanery: Valdres prosti
- Parish: Leirskogen
- Norwegian Cultural Heritage Site
- Type: Church
- Status: Not protected
- ID: 84283

Leirskogen Church (Norwegian: Leirskogen kyrkje) is a parish church of the Church of Norway in Sør-Aurdal Municipality in Innlandet county, Norway. It is located in the village of Leirskogen. It is the church for the Leirskogen parish which is part of the Valdres prosti (deanery) in the Diocese of Hamar. The white, wooden church was built in a long church design in 1924 using plans drawn up by the architects Bakken og Grimsgaard. The church seats about 90 people.

== History ==
In the 1920s, a local initiative was taken for building a church in Leirskogen because the people desired a shorter journey to church. The architect for the construction was Bakken & Grimsgaard from Drammen. The lead builder for the project was Halvor Meisdalshagen. The interior furniture was designed by the architect Jens Dunker. The building was designed as a wooden long church with a tower on the west end above the church porch. Leirskogen Chapel, as it was originally titled, was consecrated on 18 March 1924. In 1934, a sacristy was built on the east end of the choir. It has been titled as a church since 1995.

== Media gallery ==
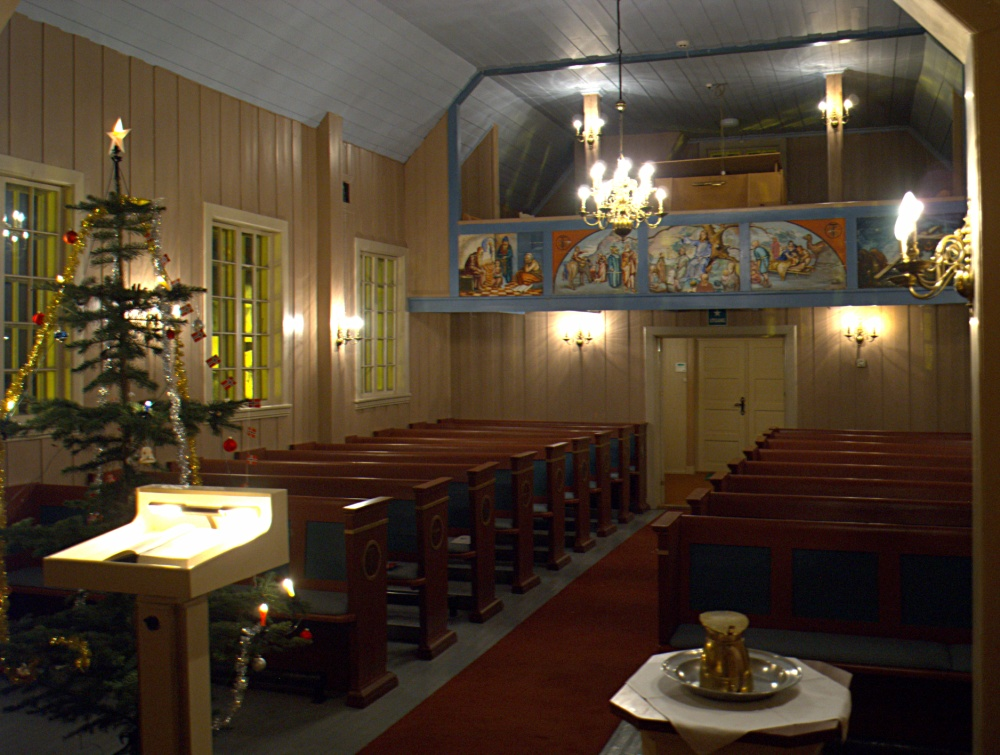

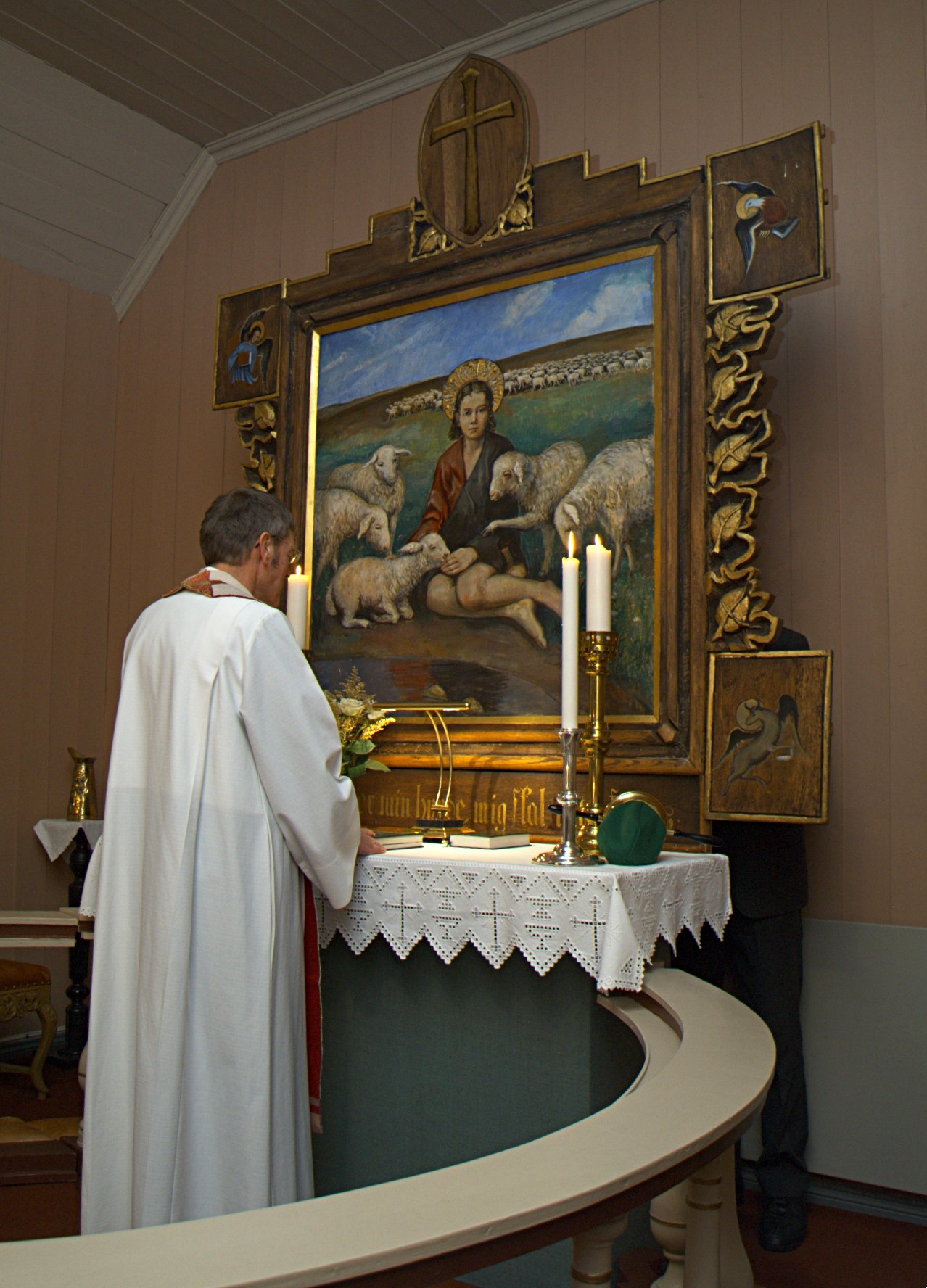

== See also ==
- List of churches in Hamar
