= Ola Hermundsen Berge =

Ola Hermundsen Berge (31 December 1768 – 28 December 1825) was a Norwegian folk artist and rose painter (Norwegian: rosemåling).

Berge was born at Sør-Aurdal in Christians amt (county), Norway. He received training for his folk art in the traditional region of Valdres. A common feature of his work are elongated S-shaped lily leaves that grow from the same starting point. He painted chests, doors, cabinets as well as interiors of churches. His first major work was the decor of Aurdal Church (Aurdal kirke) and Skrautvål Church (Skrautvål Kirke) from 1795. He also decorated the walls of Ulnes Church (Ulnes Kirke) with large murals and decorated the altar of Lomen Stave Church (Lomen gamle kirke).
