= Hedalen Stave Church =

Church in Innlandet, Norway

- Hedalen stavkyrkje
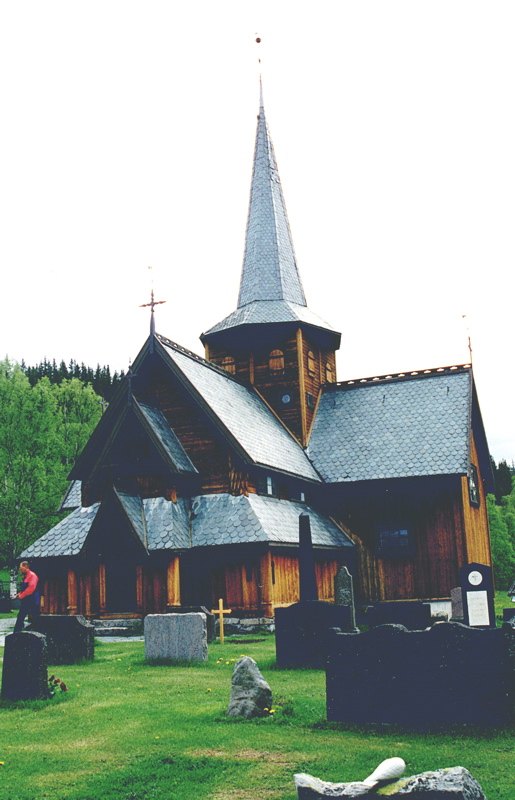
- View of the church
- Hedalen Stave Church
- 60°37′21″N 9°41′27″E
- Location: Sør-Aurdal, Innlandet
- Country: Norway
- Denomination: Church of Norway
- Previous denomination: Catholic Church
- Churchmanship: Evangelical Lutheran

History
- Status: Parish church
- Founded: c. 1160
- Consecrated: c. 1160

Architecture
- Functional status: Active
- Architectural type: Cruciform
- Style: Stave church
- Completed: c. 1160 (866 years ago)

Specifications
- Capacity: 210
- Materials: Wood

Administration
- Diocese: Hamar bispedømme
- Deanery: Valdres prosti
- Parish: Hedalen
- Norwegian Cultural Heritage Site
- Type: Church
- Status: Automatically protected
- ID: 84512

Hedalen Stave Church (Norwegian: Hedalen stavkyrkje) is a parish church of the Church of Norway in Sør-Aurdal Municipality in Innlandet county, Norway. The stave church is located in the Hedalen valley. It is the church for the Hedalen parish which is part of the Valdres prosti (deanery) in the Diocese of Hamar. The brown, wooden stave church was built in a cruciform design around the year 1160 using plans drawn up by an unknown architect. The church seats about 210 people.

== History ==
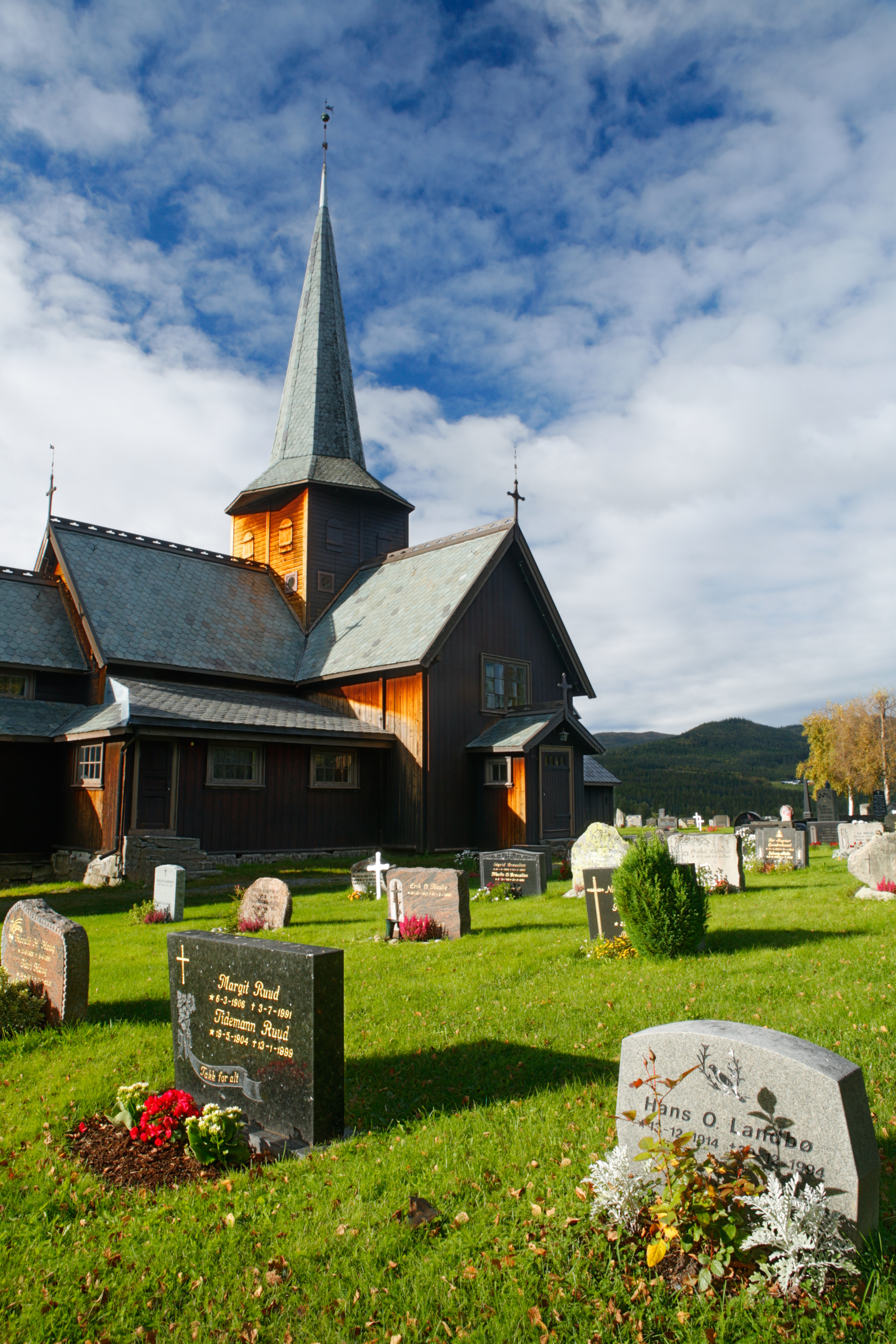
Hedalen Stavkyrkje, Sør-Aurdal

The earliest existing historical records of the church date back to the year 1327, but the church was not built that year. The church was originally built during the second half of the 12th century, possibly around the year 1160. Modern dendrochronological studies have shown that the timbers of the church were originally cut around the year 1160. The church was originally a wooden long church with a single nave. The west entrance remains from the original church. The front portal is one of the oldest and most richly ornamented in the country. It takes the form of three winged dragons, one on each side of the arch and pilasters of the entrance and one above, all elaborately intertwined in a tendril and leaf pattern.

After the Black Death, Hedalen Church was abandoned and it lay empty and overgrown for more than 150 years because so few people remained living in that area. By the 1500s and 1600s, people moved back to Hedalen and the church was put back into use. In 1699, the church was remodeled and expanded. The old choir was removed and three wings to the north, south, and east of the main nave were built, giving the church a cruciform floor plan (some sources claim this happened in 1738). The new eastern wing was the choir and there was a small sacristy attached to that. There was no tower after this project until 1738 when one was built by Svend Tråseth. Restoration work was done during 1902 under direction of architect Carl Berner (1877–1943). During the restoration work, the previous sacristy was replaced with a new choir with an apse, and the new parts were enclosed in an ambulatory. A new sacristy was built on the north side of the old choir. This also included a small reconstruction to add a new ridge turret (Norwegian: takrytter) as well as a new slate roof.

== Interior ==
Within the church there is also a reliquary, made of wood in the shape of a miniature church (called a chasse) with gilt-brass mountings and with scenes from the Bible (including Christ in Glory, his betrayal and crucifixion and the women at his tomb and the three kings presenting their gifts to the Virgin and Child) and the martyrdom of Thomas Becket. Many such reliquaries were made in western Europe from 1170 to 1220 when the martyred archbishop's cult was at its height. Like the stave churches themselves the reliquary is ornamented with dragon-heads on its gables, a feature which several Norwegian medieval reliquaries share and which might have been originally inspired by similar dragon-heads on the silver gilt reliquary of St. Olav on the enshrined on the high altar of the Nidaros Cathedral. This reliquary is considered to be the best of its type to survive and replicas of it are displayed in the Victoria and Albert Museum in London, in the Museums of Cultural History and of Art, Architecture and Design in Oslo and in the Cultural History Collection of the Bergen Museum in Bergen. Further evidence of the popularity of the cult of Thomas Becket in Valdres might be seen from the St. Thomas Church in the Filefjell mountain pass between Valdres and Sogn. The chasse from this church is in the Bergen Museum, but is in a more ruinous condition than the chasse in Hedalen. This chasse also has dragonheads and has five arches piecing its lower side, a feature it shares with the representation of a chasse in the Sør-Aurdal coat of arms. This reliquary was the principal source of inspiration for the coat of arms of Sør-Aurdal. Another source of inspiration for this coat of arms was the Reinli Stave Church. Also preserved in the church is the wooden litter for bearing this reliquary in processions, as well as a brass censer with Limoges enamel and a wooden pax-board.

The soapstone baptismal font, with its conical wooden lid, is of gothic style and is still in use. On a special mount on the wall of the church is a statue of the Virgin Mary, crowned and dressed in a golden robe lined with vair and holding the similarly crowned and robed Christ Child enthroned on her lap. The statue dates from the early 13th century as does the wooden tabernacle in the form of a church. Hedal church was originally dedicated to the Virgin Mary and this statue originally stood on the principal altar in the apse in front of a polyptych painted with scenes of her life, which could be closed over it during times of fasting. This polyptych was repainted in the Baroque period and now forms the altarpiece, in front of which is displayed a medieval crucifix of Christ on the cross in the shape of a stylized tree of life. Both the statue of the Virgin and Child and the crucifix are among the more beautiful works of medieval art to survive from the Norwegian Middle Ages.

The Virgin and Child statue was restored by the Norwegian Museum of Cultural History in 1990. After much discussion over whether it should remain in its collection, it is back in the church placed on a special mount. There was also a replica made at the same time as its restoration. It is placed on display if weather conditions makes the original's safe storage necessary.

== Media gallery ==
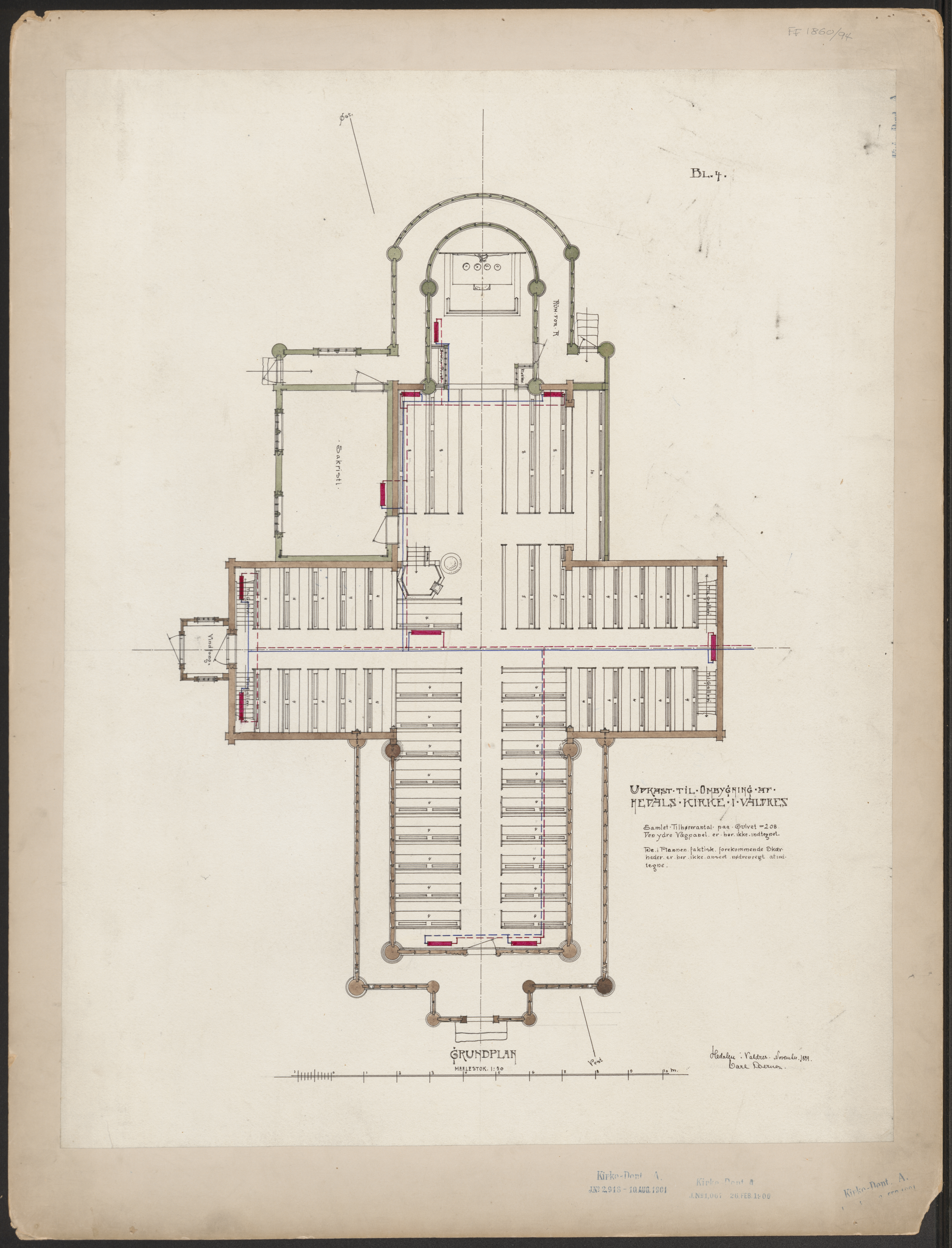
Floor plan of the church

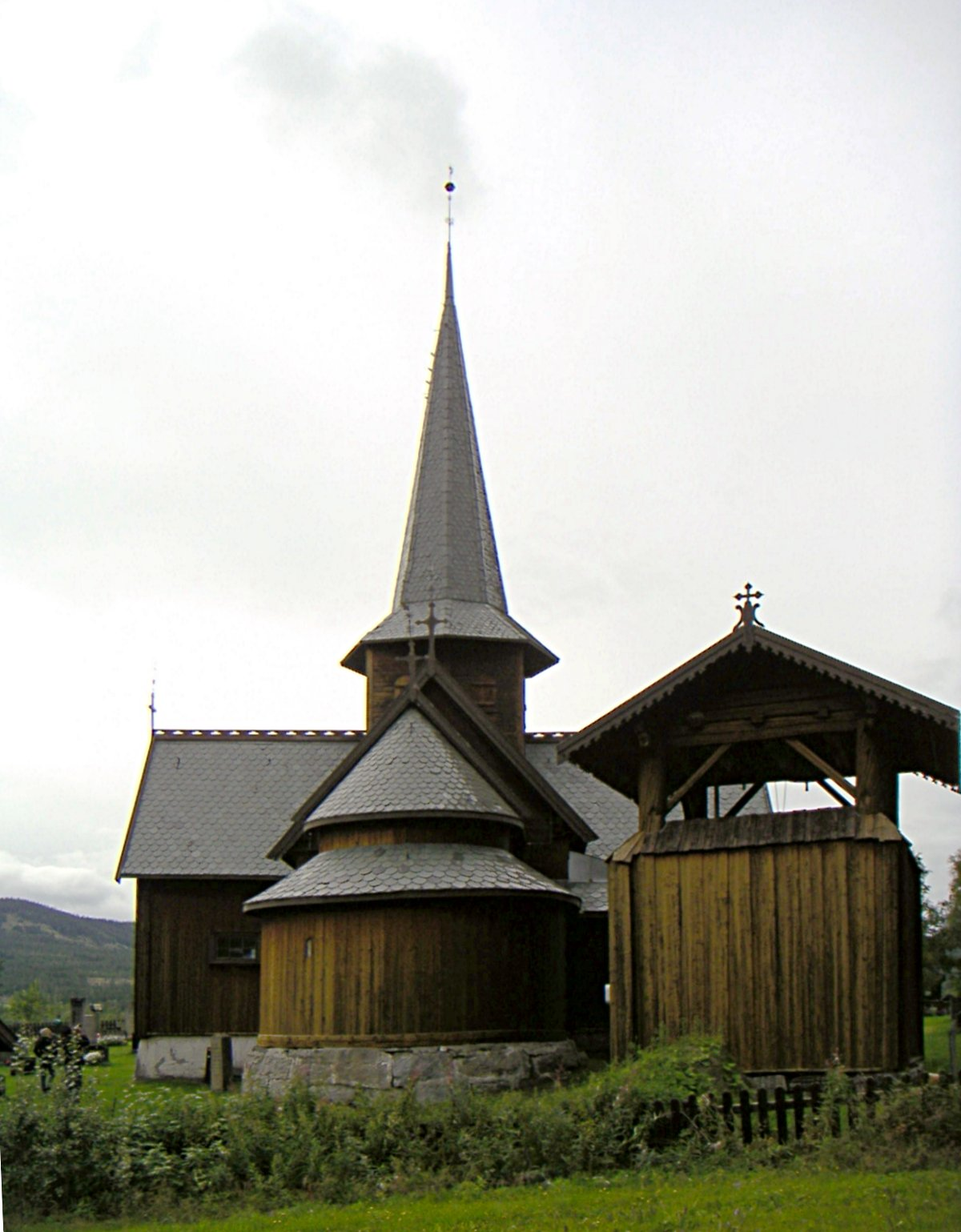
View of the rear of the church

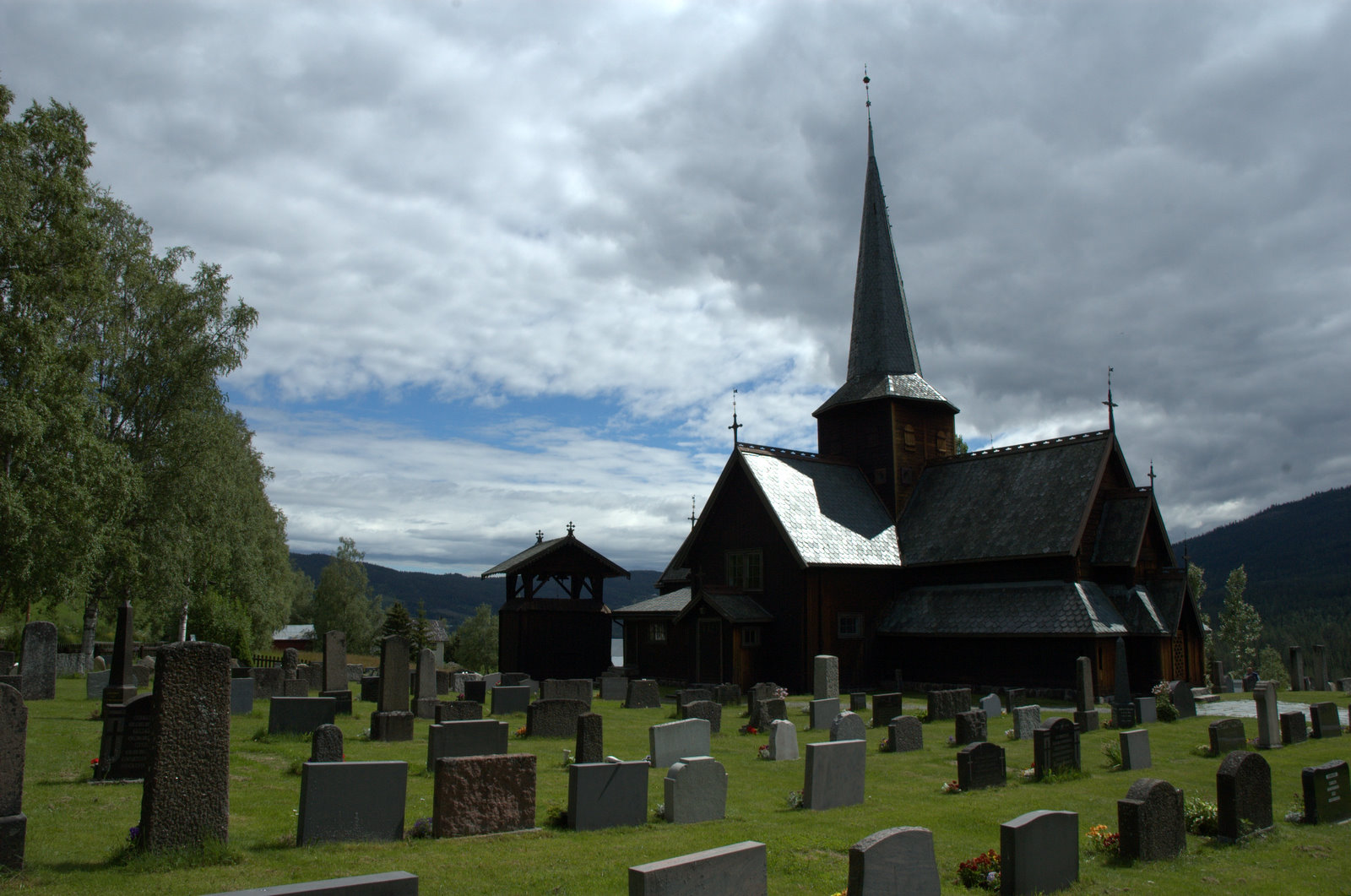
Exterior view of the church

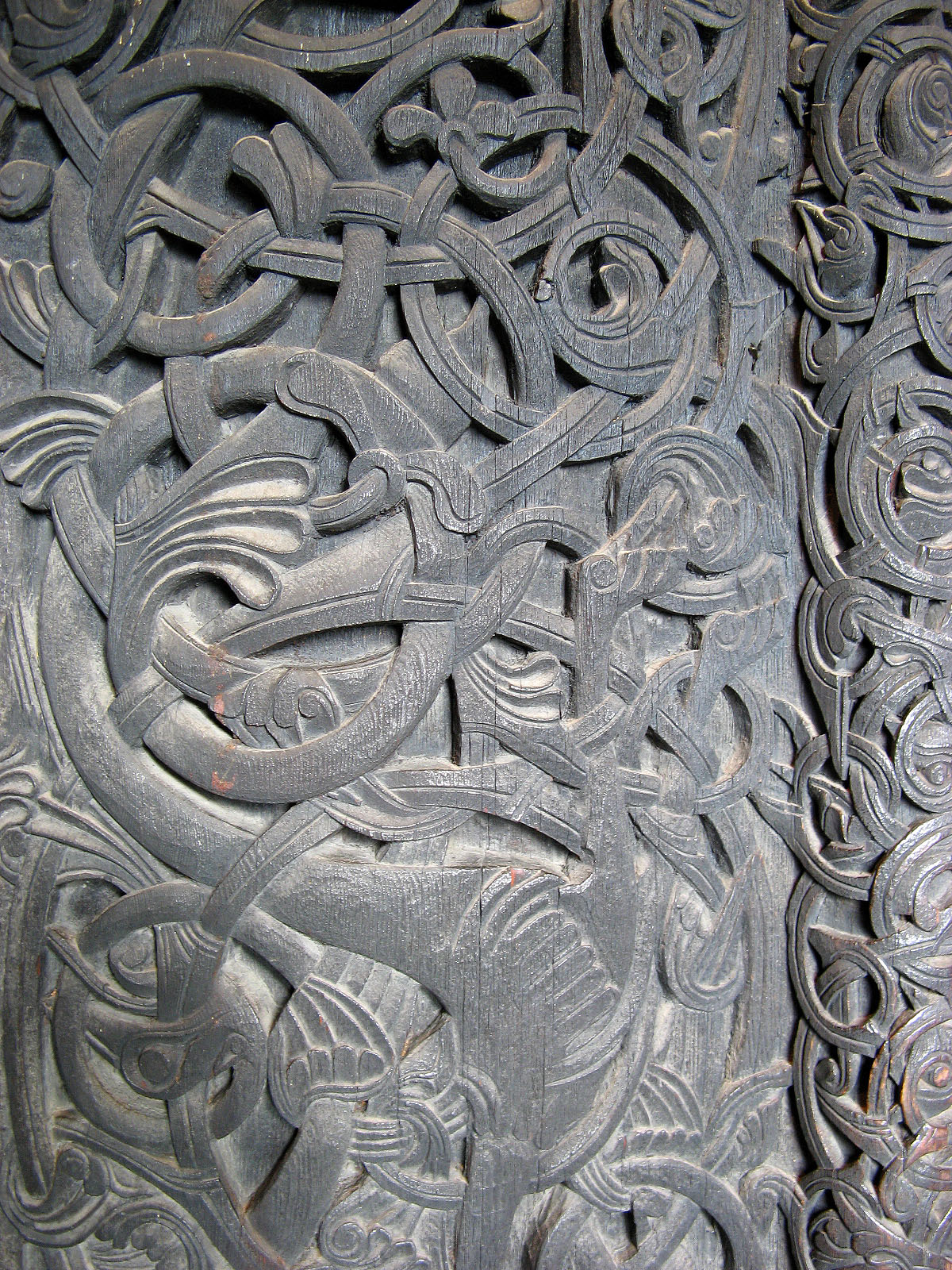
Decorative entrance door

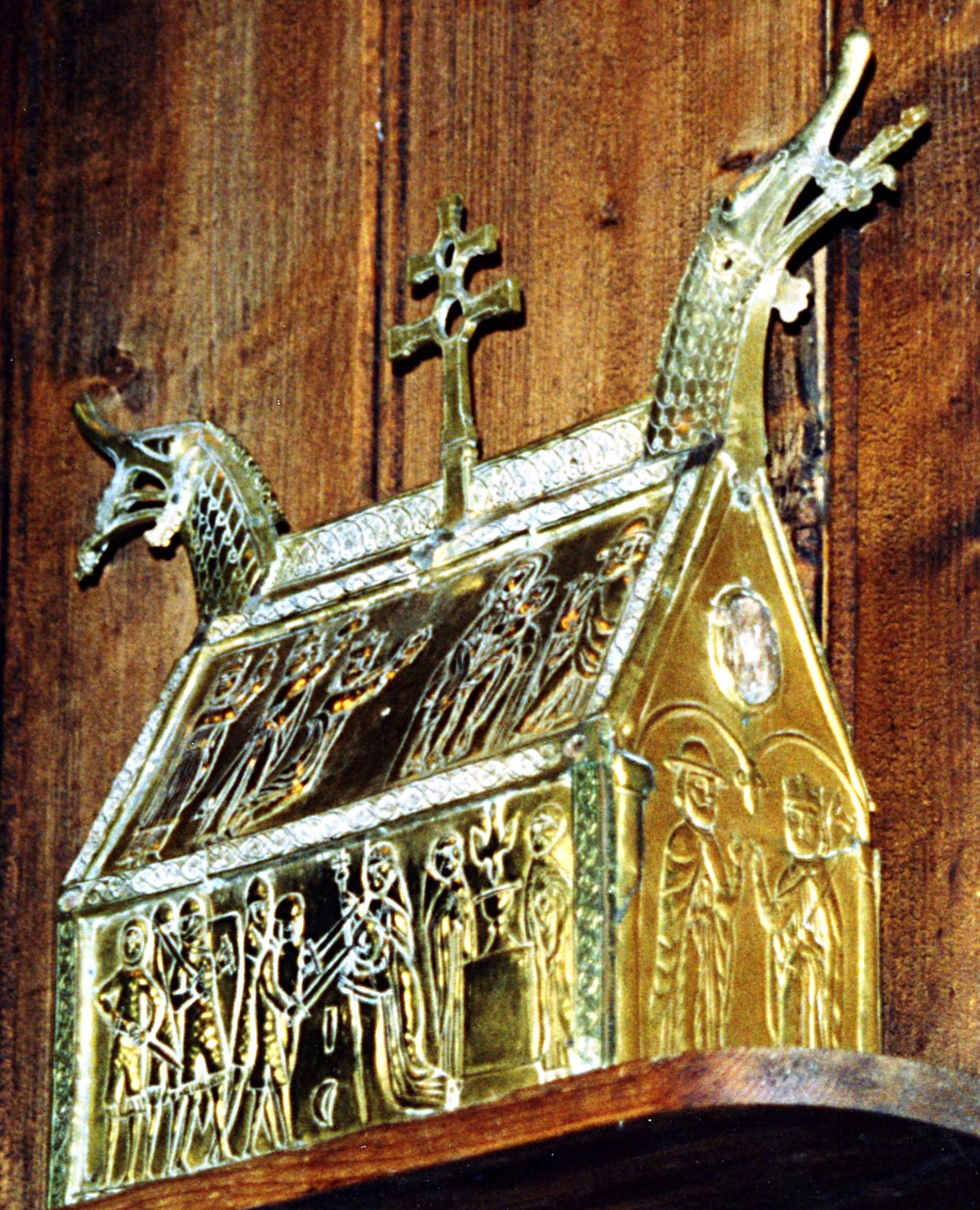
Reliquary

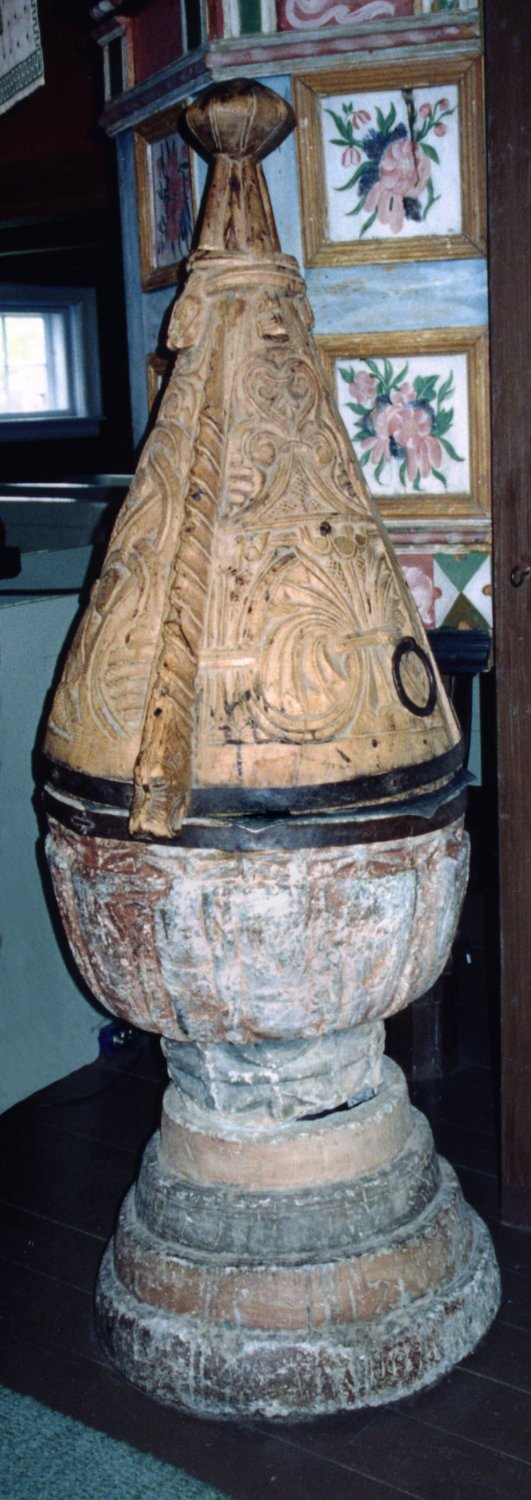
Baptismal font

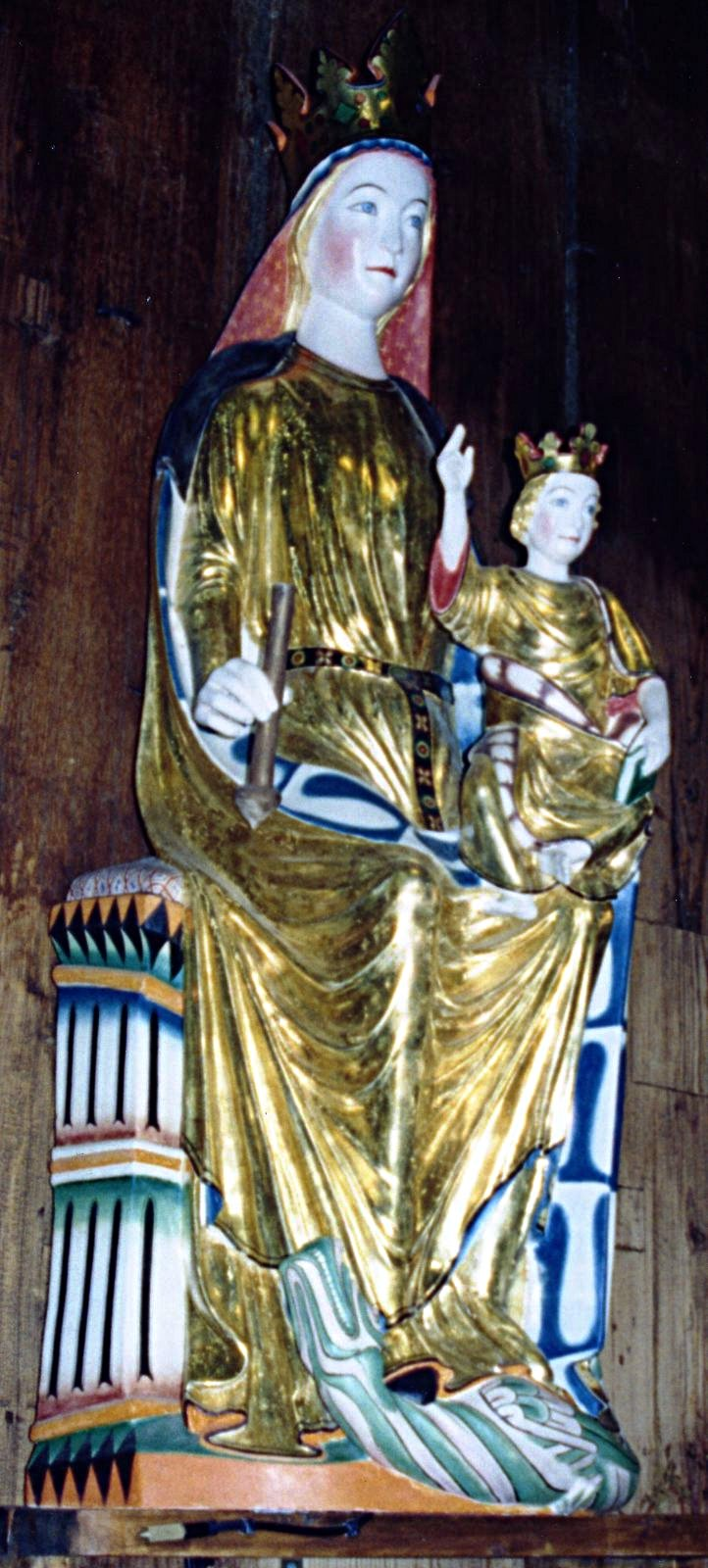
Virgin and Child statue

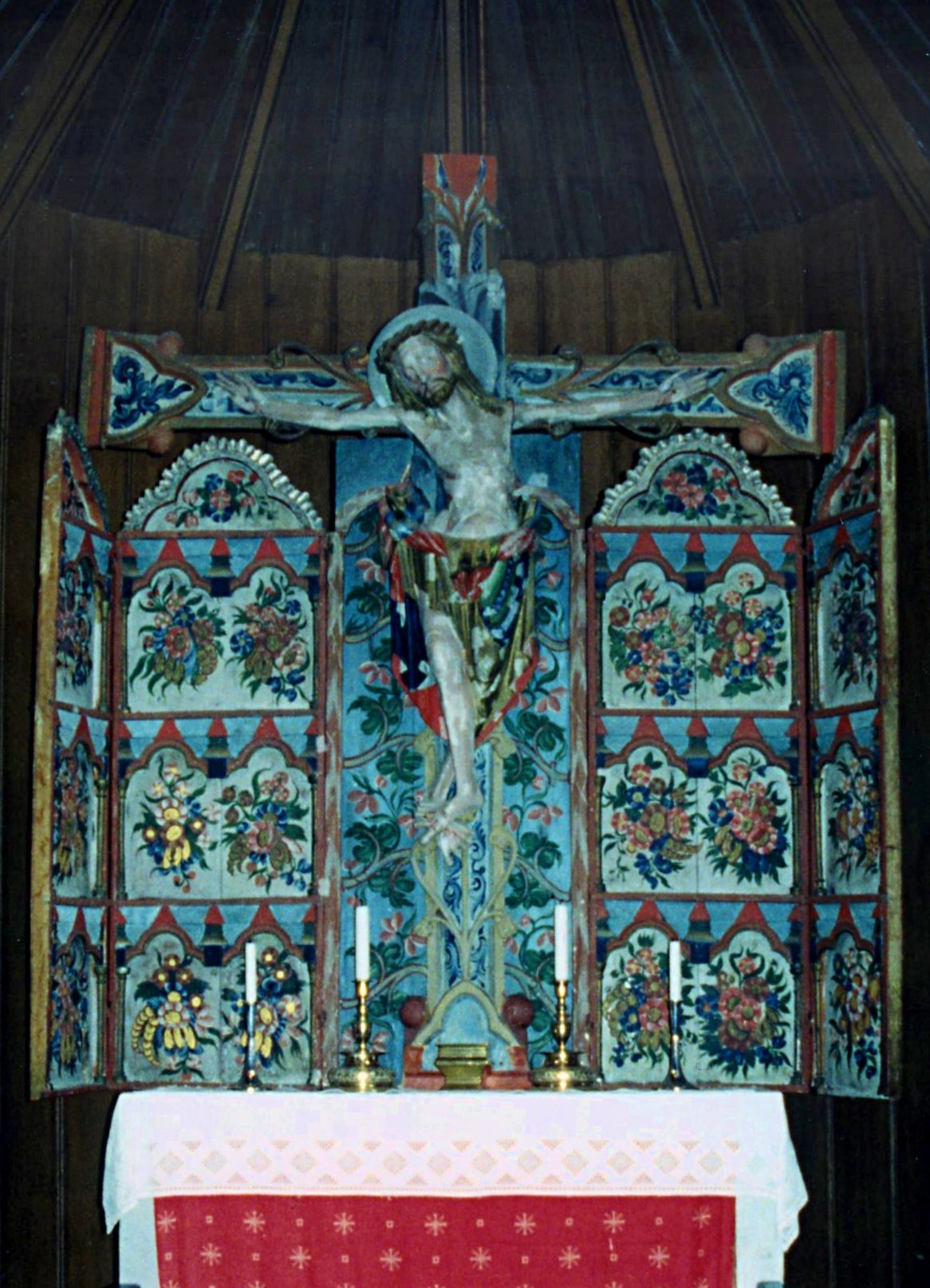
Altar and altarpiece

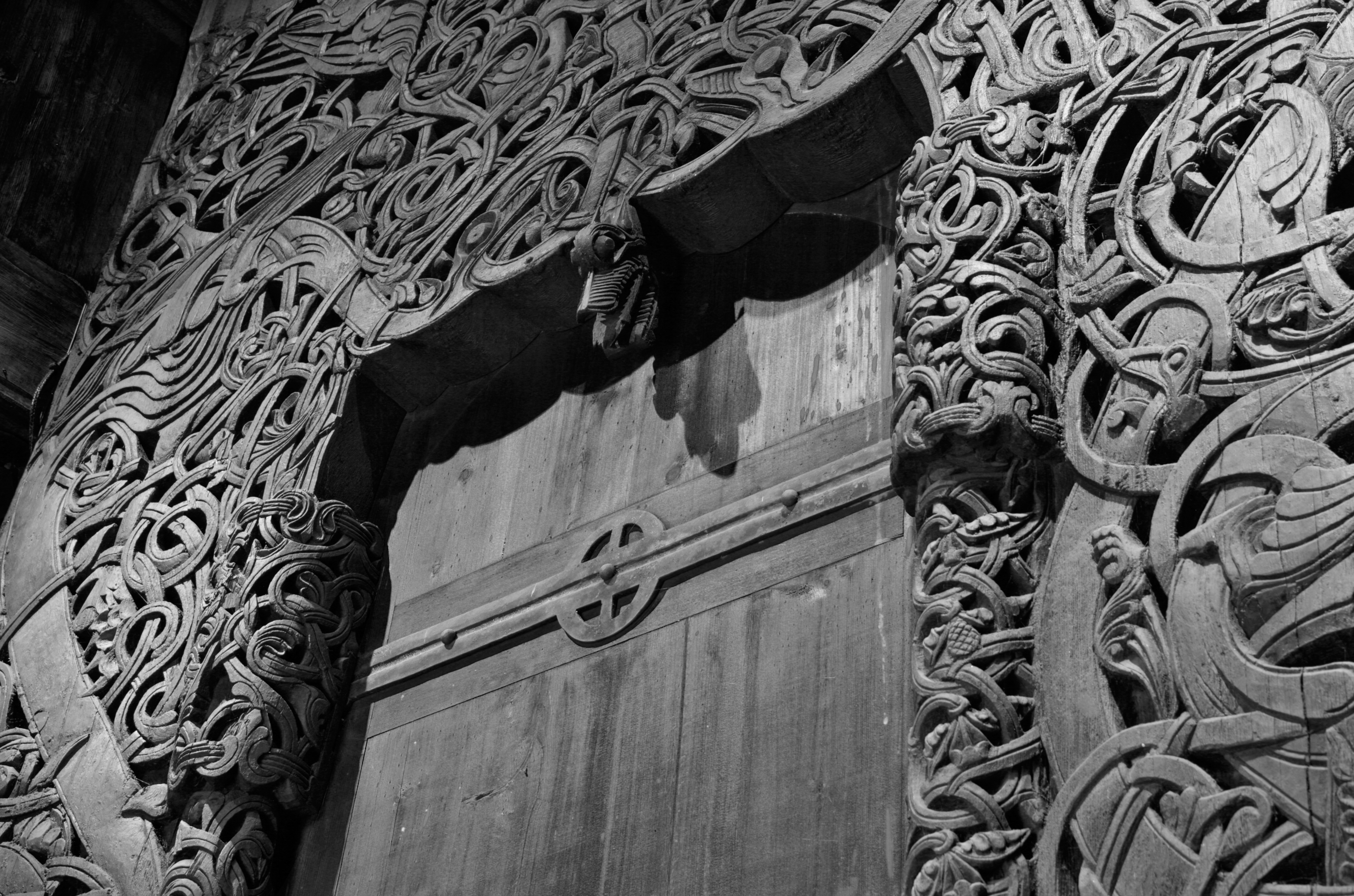
Portal over entrance door

== See also ==
- List of churches in Hamar

== Other sources ==
- Anker, Leif (2005). The Norwegian Stave Churches. Oslo: Arfo Forlag. ISBN 978-8291399294.
- Blindheim, Martin (1998). Painted Wooden Sculpture in Norway c. 1100-1250. Oslo: Aschehoug AS. ISBN 978-8200376811.
