= Hedalen =

Valley in Innlandet, Norway

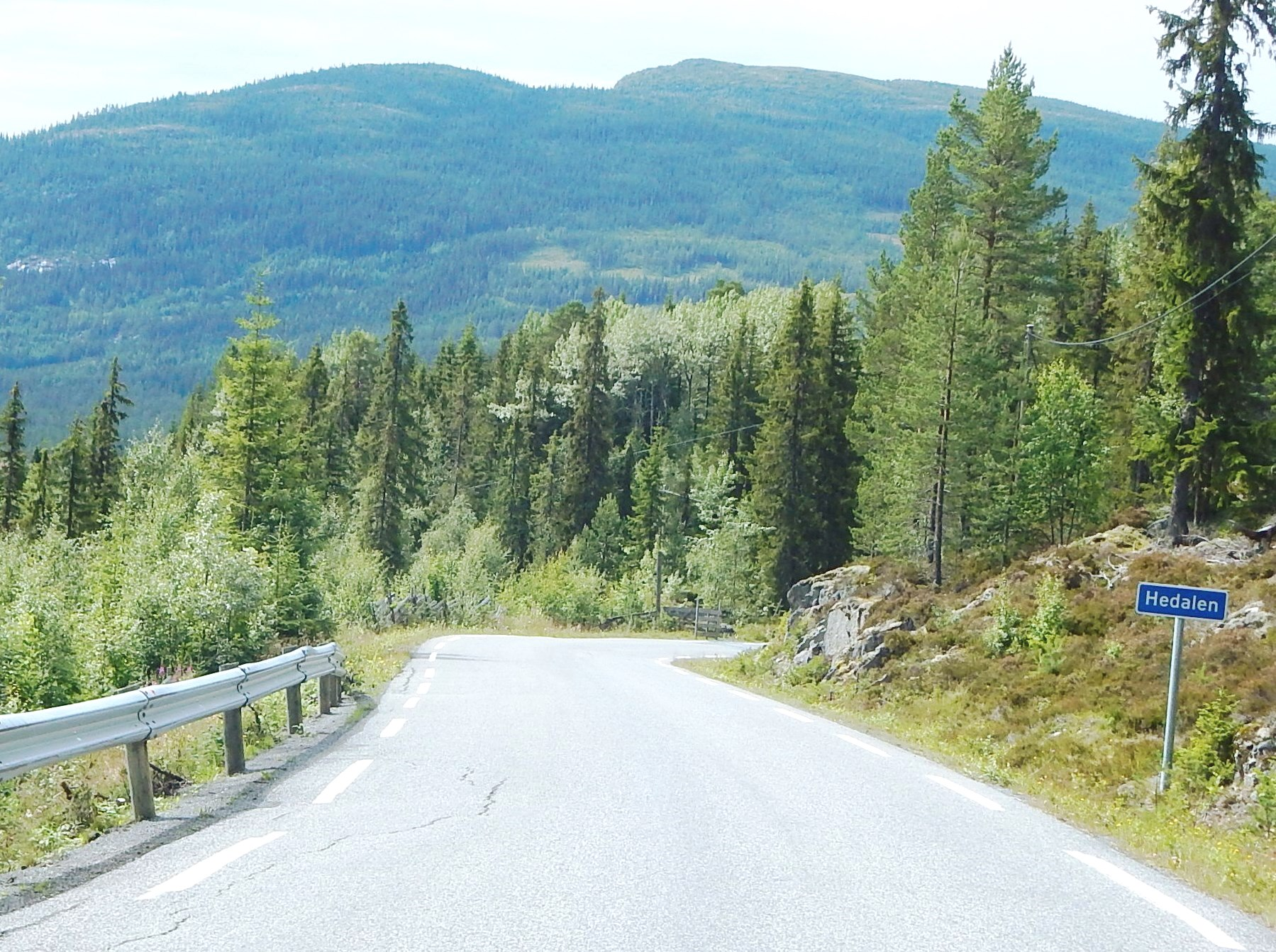
- View along County Road 225
- Length: 30 kilometres (19 mi) NW-SE

Geology
- Type: River valley

Geography
- Location: Innlandet, Norway
- Coordinates: 60.6236°N 09.6966°E
- River: Urula

Location
- Interactive map of the valley

Hedalen is a valley in Sør-Aurdal Municipality in Innlandet county, Norway. The 30-kilometre (19 mi) long valley is a side valley which branches off the main Begnadalen. The river Urula flows through the valley. The central part of the valley is located about 20 kilometres (12 mi) to the northwest of Nes i Ådal, about 36 kilometres (22 mi) so the southeast of Bagn, and about 50 kilometres (31 mi) to the east of Nesbyen. The valley is characterized by coniferous forests, agricultural properties, and scattered private homes, extends west and northwards from Nes i Ådal at the south end of the Begnadalen valley as it heads towards the Vassfaret valley. The lake Sperillen in Ringerike Municipality is located at the south end of the Hedalen valley. The Vassfaret conservation area includes part of the Hedalen valley and areas to the west.

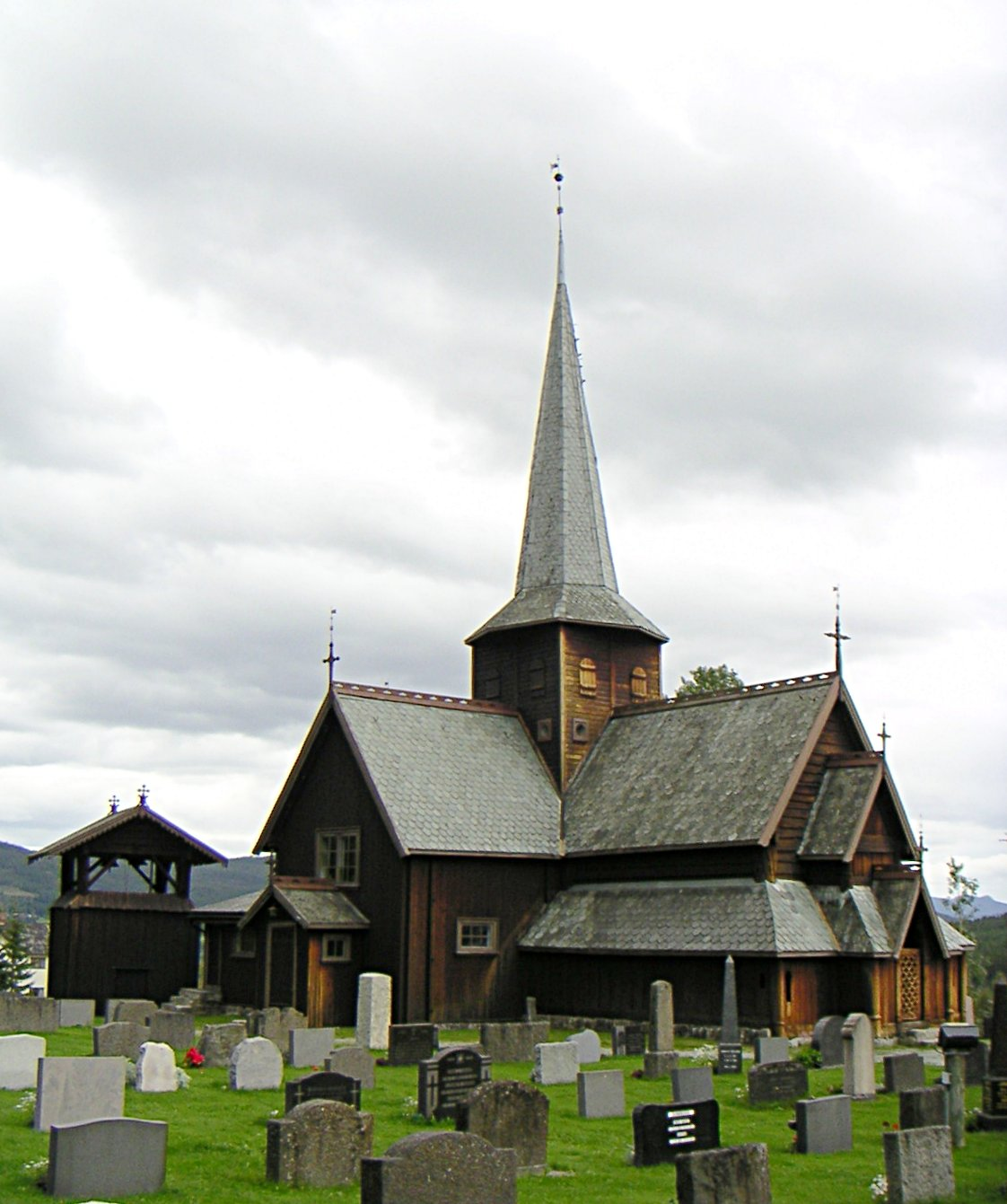
Hedal Stave Church

The County Road 243 is the main road through Hedalen, and a small toll road from there heads west into Vassfaret. The valley includes many homes and built up areas along the main road including the Hedalen primary and lower secondary school, two convenience stores, and a small filling station with service shop. The area is also known for Hedalen Stave Church, a preserved stave church built in the 1100s that is still in use.

The valley has access via County Road 243 from Nes i Ådal, County Road 225 from Begnadalen, and County Road 223 from (Nesbyen in Hallingdal. It is also possible to get there via the Strømsoddbygdveien from Sokna. This is the old royal road to Valdres.

== History ==
Since ancient times, Hedalen has been a major supplier of timber, and there were annual floats of timber on the local rivers until the late 1960s. This has been re-recorded as a cultural heritage event, and there is an annual log pond damming in Vassafaret. The authors Mikkjel Fønhus and Edvard Elsrud have set much of the action in several books throughout Hedalen and the areas in Vassfaret, among others Skoggandsmand, Slagbjørnen Rugg, and Bjørnejakt i Vassfaret.

People of the valley have had great interest for maintaining the local history by establishing a living museum at Bautahaugen Samlinger. In addition, Bautahaugen has also purchased a complete farmstead, Bergsrud i Hedalen which was established as a "living farm" that is run and operated in historically-accurate ways.

There is also an old privately owned mill, "Husemølla" or "Hedalsmølla", which is in good condition but is no longer in operation.

== See also ==
- Hedal stave church
