= Sørbølfjellet =

Mountain in Norway

Coordinates: 60°28′26″N 9°36′05″E

Highest point
- Elevation: 1,284.7 m (4,215 ft)
- Prominence: 481.4 m (1,579 ft)
- Isolation: 17.93 km (11.14 mi) to Gråfjell

Geography
- Location: Buskerud, Norway

Sørbølfjellet is a mountain of Flå municipality, Buskerud, in southern Norway.
