= Sør-Aurdal Municipality =

Municipality in Innlandet, Norway

Sør-Aurdal Municipality Sør-Aurdal kommune
- Municipality
- Søndre Aurdal herred (historic name)
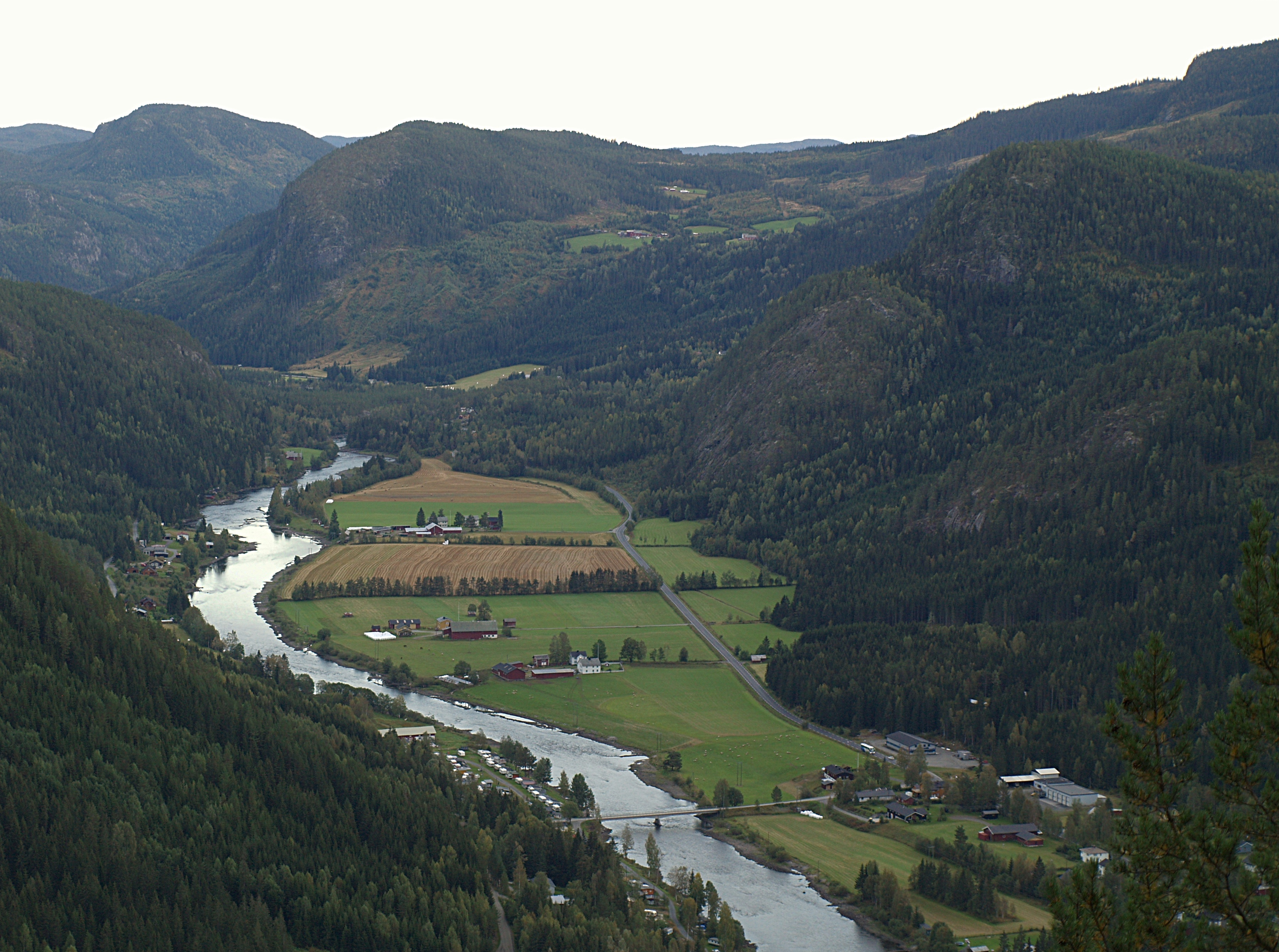
- View of Smedlund in Sør-Aurdal

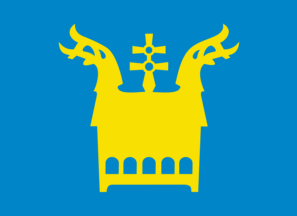
- Flag Coat of arms

- Innlandet within Norway

- Sør-Aurdal within Innlandet
- Coordinates: 60°41′47″N 9°39′32″E
- Country: Norway
- County: Innlandet
- District: Valdres
- Established: 1 Jan 1838
  - Created as: Formannskapsdistrikt
- Administrative centre: Bagn

Government
  - Mayor (2019): Marit Hougsrud (Sp)

Area
  - Total: 1,109.05 km^{2} (428.21 sq mi)
  - Land: 1,068.25 km^{2} (412.45 sq mi)
  - Water: 40.80 km^{2} (15.75 sq mi) 3.7%
  - Rank: #101 in Norway
- Highest elevation: 1,242.86 m (4,077.6 ft)

Population (2025)
  - Total: 2,822
  - Rank: #238 in Norway
  - Density: 2.5/km^{2} (6.5/sq mi)
  - Change (10 years): ▼ −9.5%
- Demonym: Søraurdøl

Official language
  - Norwegian form: Neutral
- Time zone: UTC+01:00 (CET)
  - Summer (DST): UTC+02:00 (CEST)
- ISO 3166 code: NO-3449
- Website: Official website

Sør-Aurdal is a municipality in Innlandet county, Norway. It is located in the traditional district of Valdres. The administrative centre of the municipality is the village of Bagn. Other villages in the municipality include Begna, Hedalen, and Begnadalen.

The 1,109-square-kilometre (428 sq mi) municipality is the 101st largest by area out of the 357 municipalities in Norway. Sør-Aurdal is the 238th most populous municipality in Norway with a population of 2,822. The municipality's population density is 2.5 inhabitants per square kilometre (6.5/sq mi) and its population has decreased by 9.5% over the previous 10-year period.

== General information ==
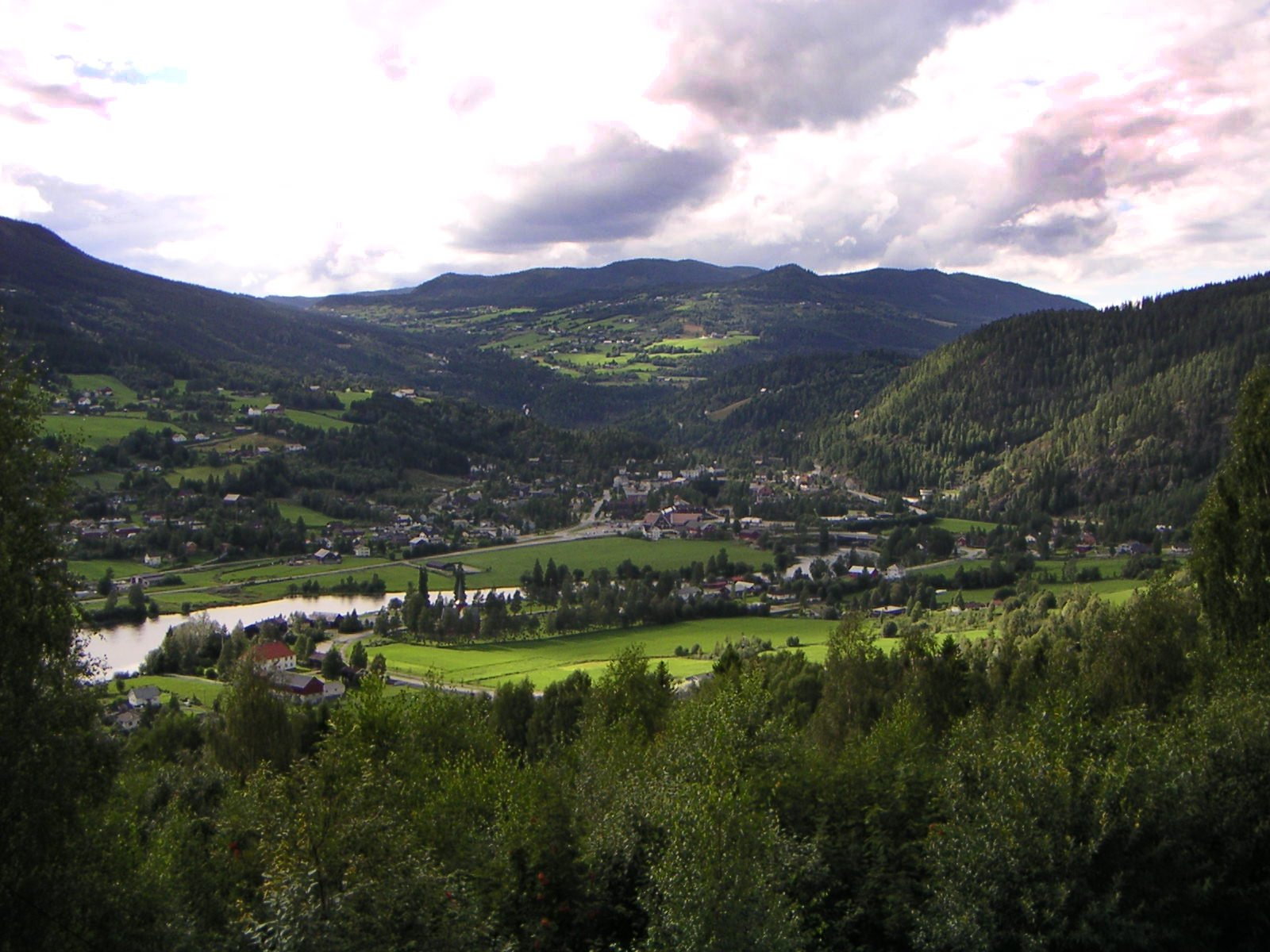
View over Bagn from Øystre Bagn, with Vestre Bagn to the left and Reinli in the background. Down by the river is the administrative center Bagn.

The parish of Søndre Aurdal (later spelled Sør-Aurdal) was established as a municipality on 1 January 1838 (see formannskapsdistrikt law). On 1 January 1894, the eastern valley area of Nordre Etnedal (population: 362) from the neighboring Nordre Aurdal Municipality and the Søndre Etnedal area (population: 1,331) from Søndre Aurdal Municipality were merged to create the new Etnedal Municipality. On 1 January 1984, the unpopulated northern side of the Makalausfjellet mountain was transferred from Sør-Aurdal Municipality to Nord-Aurdal Municipality.

Historically, this municipality was part of the old Oppland county. On 1 January 2020, the municipality became a part of the newly-formed Innlandet county (after Hedmark and Oppland counties were merged).

=== Name ===
The municipality (originally the parish) is named after the Aurdalen valley (Old Norse: Aurardalr) since it was a central geographic feature of the area. The first word in the name is sør which is essentially a prefix that means "south". The second word comes from the local valley name. The first element of that word is the genitive case of the old river name, Aur, now named Bøaelva. The river name comes from the word aurr which means "gravel". The last element of the second word is dalr which means "valley" or "dale". Historically, the name of the municipality was spelled Søndre Aurdal. On 3 November 1917, a royal resolution changed the spelling of the name of the municipality to Sør-Aurdal. Both søndre and sør mean "south" (more specifically, "søndre" means "southern"), so the name Sør-Aurdal means "(the) southern (part of) Aurdal". (The Church of Norway parish of Aurdal that had existed for centuries was divided into two in 1805, just over 30 years before the parish borders were used to defin the new municipality that was established in 1838.)

=== Coat of arms ===
The coat of arms was granted by royal decree on 9 February 1990. The official blazon is "Azure, a box reliquary Or" (Norwegian: I blått et gull relikvieskrin). This means the arms have a blue field (background) and the charge is a reliquary. The charge has a tincture of Or which means it is commonly colored yellow, but if it is made out of metal, then gold is used. The arms show the silhouette of a gilt-copper medieval reliquary (chasse). It was designed to look like the one found in the Hedal Stave Church, except that this one has five blue arches which are inspired by the arches on a similar medieval chasse from the nearby medieval St. Thomas Church at Filefjell (now in the Bergen Museum) and representing the five Church of Norway parishes of the municipality (Bagn, Reinli, Hedalen, Bruflat, and Begnadalen). It also has two dragon heads in the design since Sør-Aurdal is one of only two municipalities in Norway that have two stave churches that are still in use. The color blue was chosen to represent the two river systems in the municipality that were historically important for the logging industry and sawmills in Sør-Aurdal. The arms were designed by Arvid Sveen. The municipal flag has the same design as the coat of arms.

=== Churches ===
The Church of Norway has five parishes (sokn) within Sør-Aurdal Municipality. It is part of the Valdres prosti (deanery) in the Diocese of Hamar.

Churches in Sør-Aurdal Municipality
Parish (sokn)	Church name	Location of the church	Year built
Bagn	Bagn Church	Bagn	1736
Begnadalen	Begnadalen Church	Begnadalen	1964
Hedalen	Hedalen Stave Church	Hedalen	c. 1165
Leirskogen	Leirskogen Church	Leirskogen	1924
Reinli	Reinli Stave Church	Reinli	1326
Reinli	Reinli Chapel	Reinli	1964

== Geography ==
Sør-Aurdal Municipality is bordered on the north by Nord-Aurdal Municipality and Etnedal Municipality, on the northeast by Nordre Land Municipality, on the east by Søndre Land Municipality (all of which are in Innlandet county). It is also bordered on the south by Ringerike Municipality and Flå Municipality, and on the west by Nesbyen Municipality and Gol Municipality (all of which are in Buskerud county).

Sør-Aurdal Municipality is part of the traditional district of Valdres in central, southern Norway, situated between the Gudbrandsdal and Hallingdal valleys. Sør-Aurdal Municipality includes parts of several smaller valleys including Begnadalen, Hedalen, Vassfaret, and Vidalen. The river Begna is the main river flowing through the municipality. The highest point in the municipality is the 1,242.86-metre (4,077.6 ft) tall mountain Ørneflag, just north of the border with Flå Municipality.

== History ==
Number of minorities (1st and 2nd generation) in Sør-Aurdal by country of origin in 2017
Ancestry	Number
Netherlands	28
Romania	20
Syria	19
Germany	17
Iraq	16

Reinli Stave Church (built 1190-1250) is the third church on the same location in Reinli. A new tower was added in 1685 and the building was reconditioned by the Society for the Preservation of Ancient Norwegian Monuments in 1885.

Olaf Haraldsson traveled through Valdres in 1023, and also visited Reinli. It is assumed, then, that there was a pagan temple at the same location before the first church, some time before the year 1000.

Hedal Stave Church was built after 1160 and in 1699 it was rebuilt and changed. An old legend says the valley was abandoned during the Black Death and the church later discovered by a bear hunter. A hide is hanging in the church, although now there is only a small part left as visitors have cut away pieces over the years.

== Government ==
Sør-Aurdal Municipality is responsible for primary education (through 10th grade), outpatient health services, senior citizen services, welfare and other social services, zoning, economic development, and municipal roads and utilities. The municipality is governed by a municipal council of directly elected representatives. The mayor is indirectly elected by a vote of the municipal council. The municipality is under the jurisdiction of the Vestoppland og Valdres District Court and the Eidsivating Court of Appeal.

=== Municipal council ===
The municipal council (Kommunestyre) of Sør-Aurdal Municipality is made up of 19 representatives that are elected to four year terms. The tables below show the current and historical composition of the council by political party.

Sør-Aurdal kommunestyre 2023–2027
Party name (in Norwegian)	Number of representatives
Labour Party (Arbeiderpartiet)	6
Progress Party (Fremskrittspartiet)	2
Conservative Party (Høyre)	2
Centre Party (Senterpartiet)	9
Total number of members:	19

Sør-Aurdal kommunestyre 2019–2023
Party name (in Norwegian)	Number of representatives
Labour Party (Arbeiderpartiet)	6
Progress Party (Fremskrittspartiet)	1
Conservative Party (Høyre)	2
Centre Party (Senterpartiet)	9
Cross-party municipal list (Tverrpolitisk Kommuneliste)	1
Total number of members:	19

Sør-Aurdal kommunestyre 2015–2019
Party name (in Norwegian)	Number of representatives
Labour Party (Arbeiderpartiet)	6
Progress Party (Fremskrittspartiet)	1
Conservative Party (Høyre)	2
Christian Democratic Party (Kristelig Folkeparti)	2
Centre Party (Senterpartiet)	12
Cross-party municipal list (Tverrpolitisk Kommuneliste)	2
Total number of members:	25

Sør-Aurdal kommunestyre 2011–2015
Party name (in Norwegian)	Number of representatives
Labour Party (Arbeiderpartiet)	8
Progress Party (Fremskrittspartiet)	3
Conservative Party (Høyre)	2
Christian Democratic Party (Kristelig Folkeparti)	1
Centre Party (Senterpartiet)	8
Cross-party municipal list (Tverrpolitisk Kommuneliste)	3
Total number of members:	25

Sør-Aurdal kommunestyre 2007–2011
Party name (in Norwegian)	Number of representatives
Labour Party (Arbeiderpartiet)	8
Progress Party (Fremskrittspartiet)	4
Conservative Party (Høyre)	1
Christian Democratic Party (Kristelig Folkeparti)	1
Centre Party (Senterpartiet)	8
Cross-party municipal list (Tverrpolitisk Kommuneliste)	3
Total number of members:	25

Sør-Aurdal kommunestyre 2003–2007
Party name (in Norwegian)	Number of representatives
Labour Party (Arbeiderpartiet)	10
Conservative Party (Høyre)	2
Christian Democratic Party (Kristelig Folkeparti)	2
Centre Party (Senterpartiet)	5
Socialist Left Party (Sosialistisk Venstreparti)	2
Cross-party municipal list (Tverrpolitisk Kommuneliste)	4
Total number of members:	25

Sør-Aurdal kommunestyre 1999–2003
Party name (in Norwegian)	Number of representatives
Labour Party (Arbeiderpartiet)	11
Conservative Party (Høyre)	3
Christian Democratic Party (Kristelig Folkeparti)	2
Centre Party (Senterpartiet)	3
Cross-party municipal list (Tverrpolitisk Kommuneliste)	6
Total number of members:	25

Sør-Aurdal kommunestyre 1995–1999
Party name (in Norwegian)	Number of representatives
Labour Party (Arbeiderpartiet)	10
Conservative Party (Høyre)	3
Socialist Left Party (Sosialistisk Venstreparti)	1
Joint list of the Centre Party (Senterpartiet) and the Christian Democratic Party (Kristelig Folkeparti)	9
Cross-party municipal list (Tverrpolitisk Kommuneliste)	2
Total number of members:	25

Sør-Aurdal kommunestyre 1991–1995
Party name (in Norwegian)	Number of representatives
Labour Party (Arbeiderpartiet)	9
Christian Democratic Party (Kristelig Folkeparti)	1
Socialist Left Party (Sosialistisk Venstreparti)	2
Joint list of the Conservative Party (Høyre), Centre Party (Senterpartiet), and Liberal Party (Venstre)	13
Total number of members:	25

Sør-Aurdal kommunestyre 1987–1991
Party name (in Norwegian)	Number of representatives
Labour Party (Arbeiderpartiet)	13
Conservative Party (Høyre)	3
Christian Democratic Party (Kristelig Folkeparti)	2
Centre Party (Senterpartiet)	6
Socialist Left Party (Sosialistisk Venstreparti)	1
Total number of members:	25

Sør-Aurdal kommunestyre 1983–1987
Party name (in Norwegian)	Number of representatives
Labour Party (Arbeiderpartiet)	14
Conservative Party (Høyre)	3
Christian Democratic Party (Kristelig Folkeparti)	2
Centre Party (Senterpartiet)	5
Liberal Party (Venstre)	1
Total number of members:	25

Sør-Aurdal kommunestyre 1979–1983
Party name (in Norwegian)	Number of representatives
Labour Party (Arbeiderpartiet)	13
Conservative Party (Høyre)	4
Christian Democratic Party (Kristelig Folkeparti)	2
Centre Party (Senterpartiet)	5
Liberal Party (Venstre)	1
Total number of members:	25

Sør-Aurdal kommunestyre 1975–1979
Party name (in Norwegian)	Number of representatives
Labour Party (Arbeiderpartiet)	13
Conservative Party (Høyre)	1
Christian Democratic Party (Kristelig Folkeparti)	3
Centre Party (Senterpartiet)	6
Socialist Left Party (Sosialistisk Venstreparti)	1
Liberal Party (Venstre)	1
Total number of members:	25

Sør-Aurdal kommunestyre 1971–1975
Party name (in Norwegian)	Number of representatives
Labour Party (Arbeiderpartiet)	14
Christian Democratic Party (Kristelig Folkeparti)	2
Liberal Party (Venstre)	1
Joint List(s) of Non-Socialist Parties (Borgerlige Felleslister)	8
Total number of members:	25

Sør-Aurdal kommunestyre 1967–1971
Party name (in Norwegian)	Number of representatives
Labour Party (Arbeiderpartiet)	15
Christian Democratic Party (Kristelig Folkeparti)	1
Joint List(s) of Non-Socialist Parties (Borgerlige Felleslister)	9
Total number of members:	25

Sør-Aurdal kommunestyre 1963–1967
Party name (in Norwegian)	Number of representatives
Labour Party (Arbeiderpartiet)	15
Christian Democratic Party (Kristelig Folkeparti)	1
Joint List(s) of Non-Socialist Parties (Borgerlige Felleslister)	8
Local List(s) (Lokale lister)	1
Total number of members:	25

Sør-Aurdal herredsstyre 1959–1963
Party name (in Norwegian)	Number of representatives
Labour Party (Arbeiderpartiet)	14
Christian Democratic Party (Kristelig Folkeparti)	2
Joint List(s) of Non-Socialist Parties (Borgerlige Felleslister)	8
Local List(s) (Lokale lister)	1
Total number of members:	25

Sør-Aurdal herredsstyre 1955–1959
Party name (in Norwegian)	Number of representatives
Labour Party (Arbeiderpartiet)	14
Christian Democratic Party (Kristelig Folkeparti)	2
Joint List(s) of Non-Socialist Parties (Borgerlige Felleslister)	9
Total number of members:	25

Sør-Aurdal herredsstyre 1951–1955
Party name (in Norwegian)	Number of representatives
Labour Party (Arbeiderpartiet)	18
Joint List(s) of Non-Socialist Parties (Borgerlige Felleslister)	14
Total number of members:	32

Sør-Aurdal herredsstyre 1947–1951
Party name (in Norwegian)	Number of representatives
Labour Party (Arbeiderpartiet)	14
Communist Party (Kommunistiske Parti)	3
Farmers' Party (Bondepartiet)	4
Joint list of the Liberal Party (Venstre) and the Radical People's Party (Radikale Folkepartiet)	2
Joint List(s) of Non-Socialist Parties (Borgerlige Felleslister)	9
Total number of members:	32

Sør-Aurdal herredsstyre 1945–1947
Party name (in Norwegian)	Number of representatives
Labour Party (Arbeiderpartiet)	13
Communist Party (Kommunistiske Parti)	3
Joint List(s) of Non-Socialist Parties (Borgerlige Felleslister)	7
Local List(s) (Lokale lister)	9
Total number of members:	32

Sør-Aurdal herredsstyre 1937–1940*
Party name (in Norwegian)	Number of representatives
Labour Party (Arbeiderpartiet)	14
Joint List(s) of Non-Socialist Parties (Borgerlige Felleslister)	14
Local List(s) (Lokale lister)	4
Total number of members:	32
Note: Due to the German occupation of Norway during World War II, no elections were held for new municipal councils until after the war ended in 1945.

=== Mayors ===
The mayor (Norwegian: ordfører) of Sør-Aurdal Municipality is the political leader of the municipality and the chairperson of the municipal council. Here is a list of people who have held this position:

- 1838–1842: Ole Ellingsen Østvold
- 1842–1845: Christoffer Juckam
- 1846–1849: Johan H. Corneliussen
- 1850–1851: Lars K. Kirkeberg
- 1852–1859: Erik Tidemandsen Wold
- 1860–1860: John Nilsen Fjeld
- 1860–1863: Lars K. Kirkeberg
- 1864–1871: Mikkel Sörböen
- 1872–1881: Erling Wold
- 1882–1883: Ole G. Nerbye
- 1884–1891: Erling Wold
- 1892–1893: Ole M. Øvergaard
- 1894–1898: Erling Wold
- 1899–1904: Arne Fönhus, Jr.
- 1905–1907: Erling Wold
- 1908–1913: Ole M. Øvergaard
- 1914–1919: Ole O. Tronrud
- 1920–1925: Arne H. Grøv
- 1926–1927: Kristoffer Eid
- 1928–1931: Eirik Klemmetsrud
- 1932–1940: Arne H. Grøv (V)
- 1941–1944: Kristoffer Eid (NS)
- 1945–1945: Arne H. Grøv (V)
- 1946–1963: Harald Bakken (Ap)
- 1964–1981: Hallgrim Tronrud (Ap)
- 1982–1991: Kristoffer Storruste (Ap)
- 1992–1999: Svein Thorsrud (Sp)
- 1999–2007: Knut Torgersen (Ap)
- 2007–2019: Kåre Helland (Sp)
- 2019–present: Marit Hougsrud (Sp)

== Media gallery ==
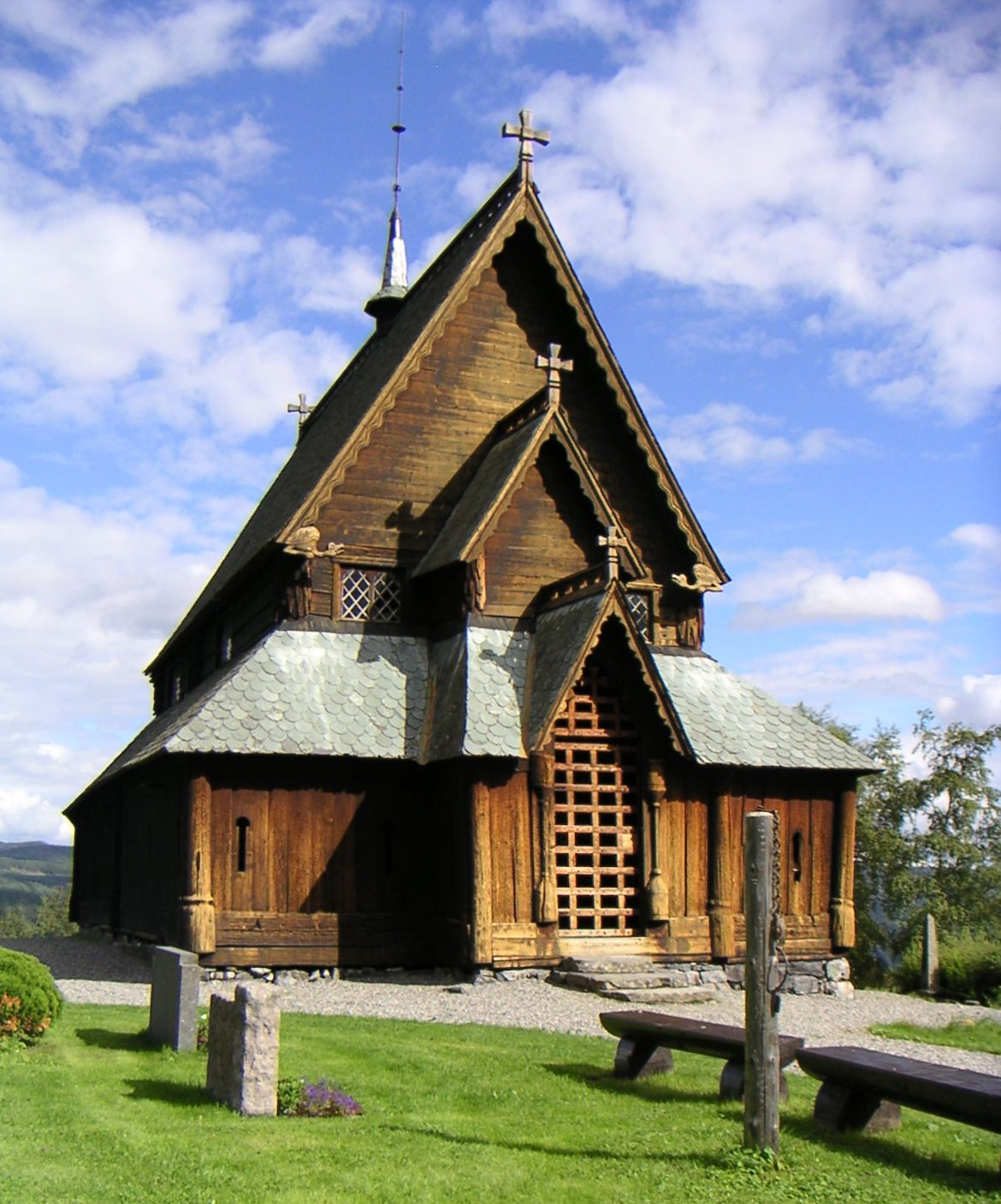
Reinli Stave Church

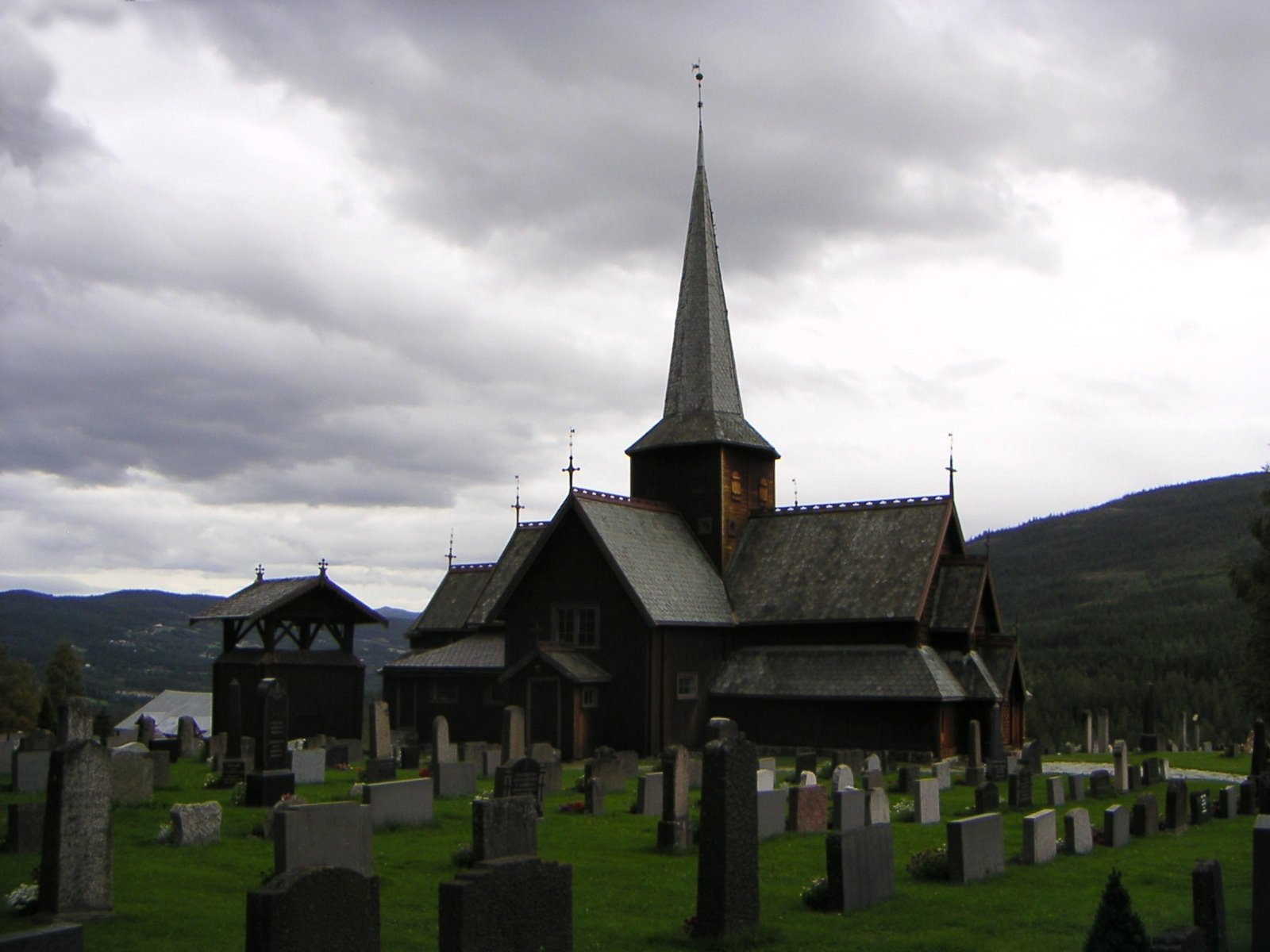
Hedal Stave Church

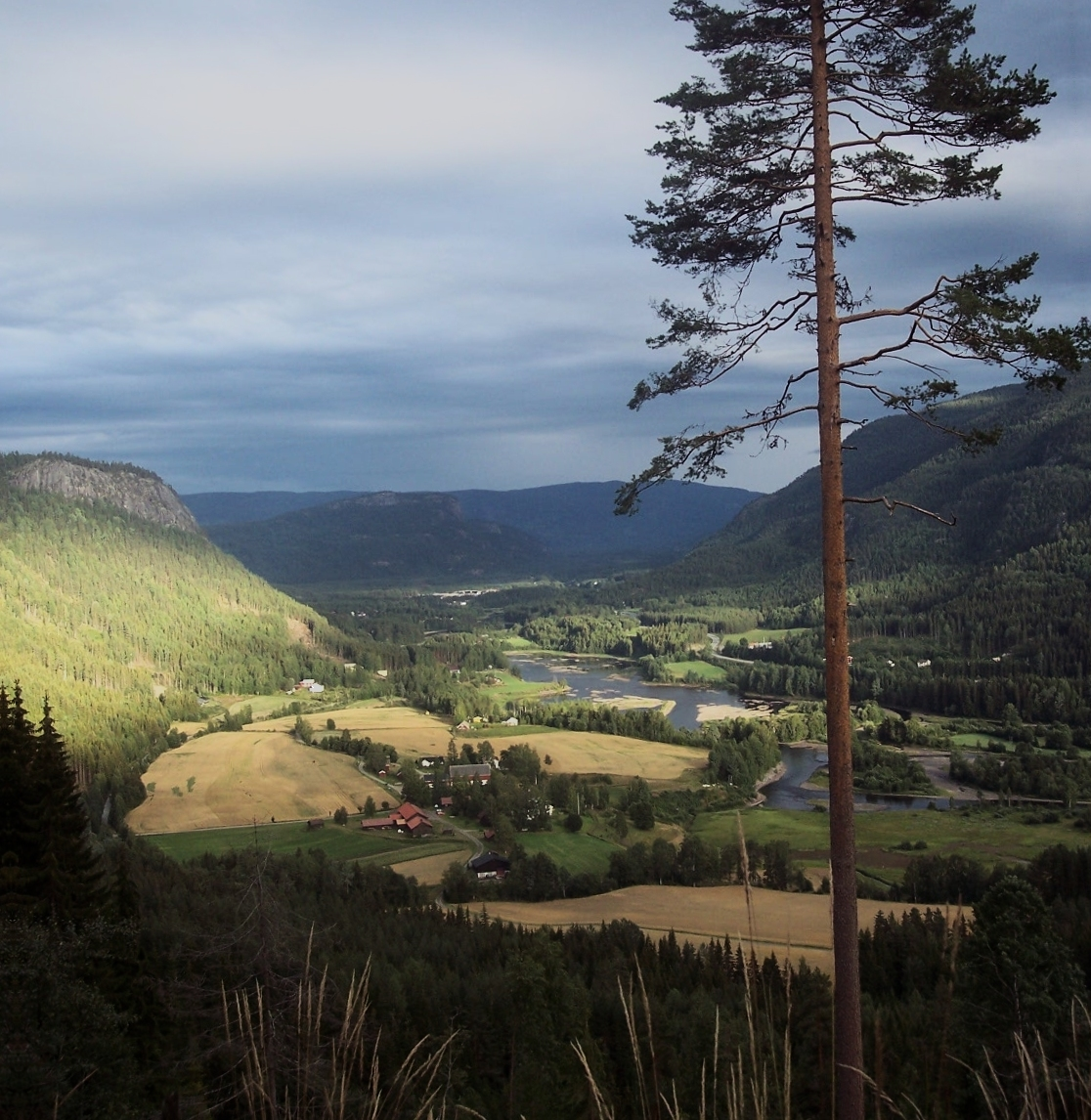
Begnadalen

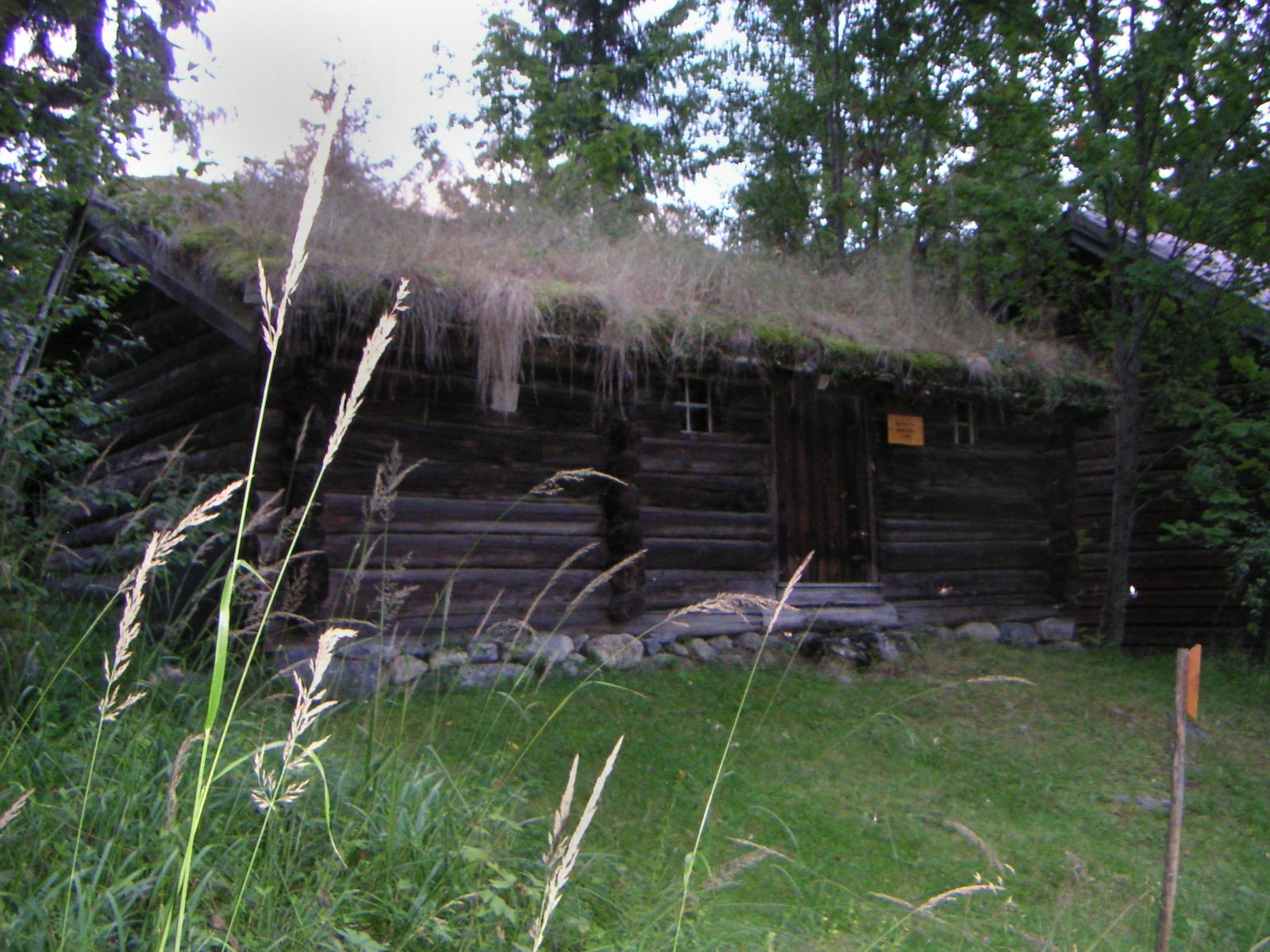
Svartsetera, Bagn Bygdesamling

== Attractions ==
- Bagn Bygdesamling is a museum that is associated with Valdres Folkemuseum. It is located 8 kilometres (5.0 mi) south of Bagn. It consists of twelve log houses and a building for permanent displays. A part of the museum is at Sandviken and the farm is Bagnsbergatn.
- Bautahaugen Samlinger is another museum that is also associated with Valdres Folkemuseum. It is located in the middle of Hedalen. It consists of a collection of houses and items from Hedalen. The Hedal Stave Church is located just nearby.

== Notable people ==
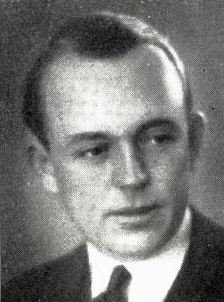
Rolf Otto Andvord, 1909

- Ola Hermundsen Berge (1768 in Sør-Aurdal - 1825), a folk artist and rose painter
- Hans Jacob Stabel (1769–1836), a priest in Sør-Aurdal in 1806 and a member of the constitutional assembly at Eidsvoll Manor in 1814
- Haldor Boen (1851 in Sør-Aurdal – 1912), an American congressman from Minnesota
- Mikkjel Fønhus (1874 in Sør-Aurdal - 1973), a journalist, novelist, and short story writer about animals in the wilderness
- Sigurd Islandsmoen (1881 in Bagn – 1964), a composer of music for the Church of Norway
- Rolf Andvord (1890 in Sør-Aurdal – 1976), a jurist and diplomat
- Per Juvkam (1907 in Sør-Aurdal – 2003), a Lutheran Bishop of Bjørgvin from 1961-1977
- Ruth Lagesen (1914 in Bagn – 2005), a pianist and conductor
- Morten Bakke (born 1968 in Hedalen), a retired football goalkeeper with over 300 club caps
