= Vidalen =

Valley in Innlandet, Norway

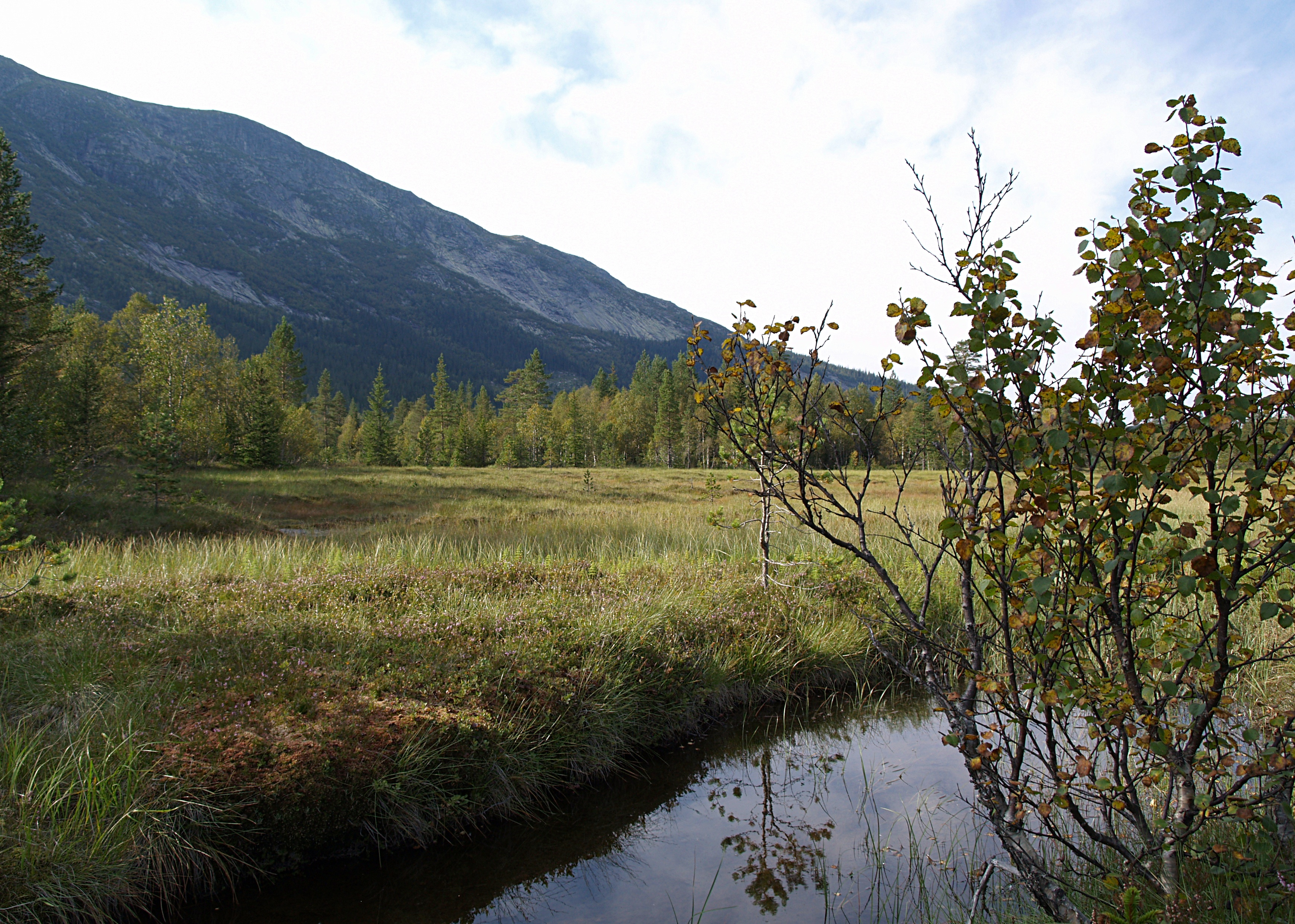
- View of the Vidalen valley

Geology
- Type: River valley

Geography
- Location: Innlandet and Buskerud, Norway
- Coordinates: 60.491395°N 9.82452°E

Location
- Interactive map of the valley

Vidalen is a small forested valley in Norway that runs along the border between Sør-Aurdal Municipality in Innlandet county and Ringerike Municipality (and a small part of Flå Municipality) in Buskerud county.

The river Vidøla is a small river which flows through the valley down to where it flows into the Urula river where the valley joins the Hedalen valley. From there it flows into the lake Sperillen just south of the village of Nes in Ådal. The area has traditionally been used for forestry, grazing, hunting, and fishing. The coniferous forest consists mostly of spruce. Logging has been underway in the valley for more than 300 years.

Vidalen offers a varied landscape with forests, mountains, lakes, and marshland combined with an abundance of wildlife. The Vassfaret og Vidalen landskapsvernområde is a conservation area which was established in the area during 1985. The protected areas extends approximately 50 kilometres (31 mi) from south to north.
