= Bagn =

Village in Sør-Aurdal Municipality, Norway

- Village
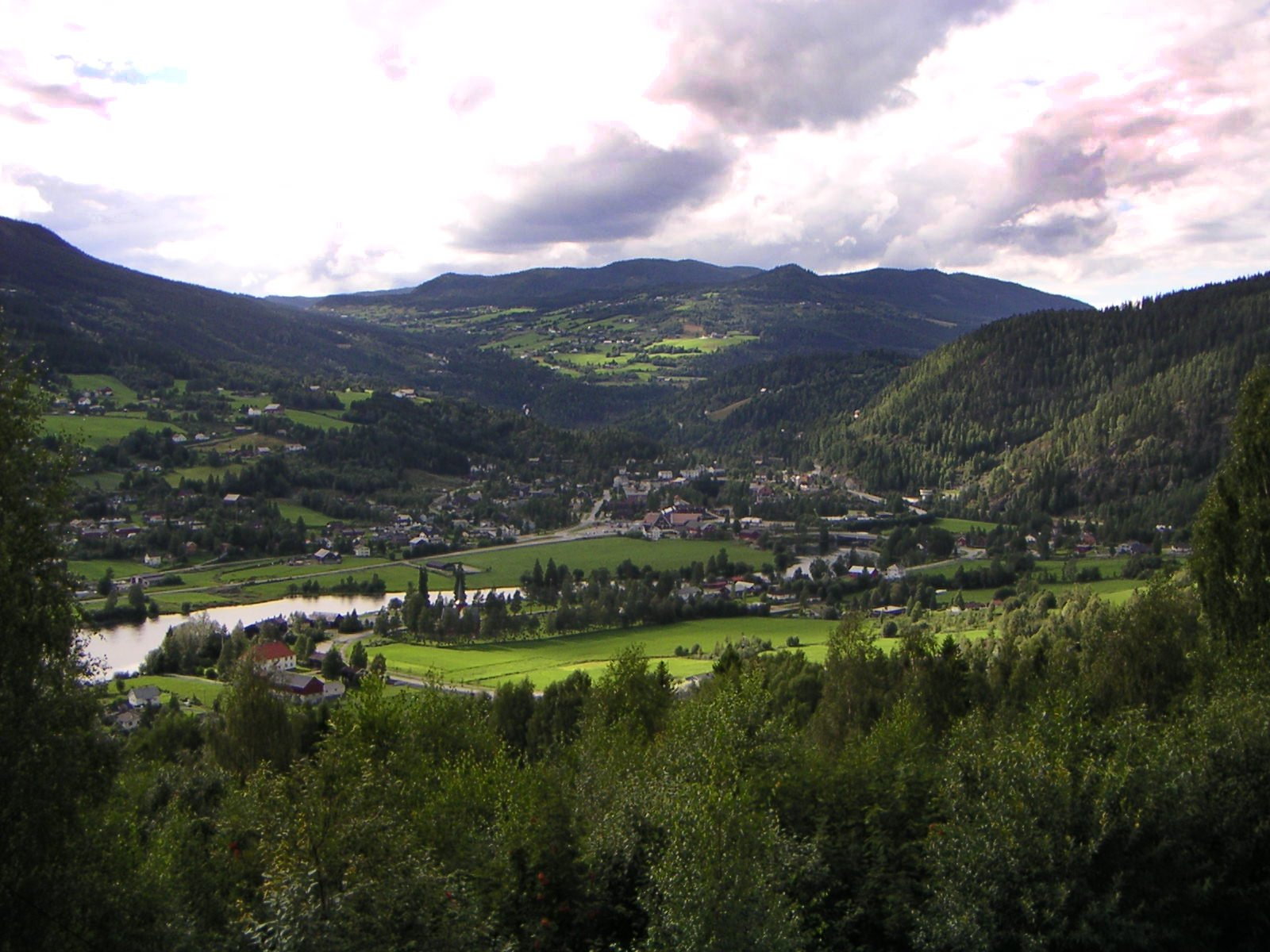
- View of the village
- Interactive map of Bagn
- Location within Innlandet Location within Norway
- Coordinates: 60.82249°N 9.55206°E
- Country: Norway
- Region: Eastern Norway
- County: Innlandet
- District: Valdres
- Municipality: Sør-Aurdal Municipality

Area
  - Total: 0.86 km^{2} (0.33 sq mi)
- Elevation: 230 m (750 ft)

Population (2024)
  - Total: 616
  - Density: 716/km^{2} (1,850/sq mi)
- Time zone: UTC+01:00 (CET)
  - Summer (DST): UTC+02:00 (CEST)
- Post Code: 2930 Bagn

Bagn is the administrative centre of Sør-Aurdal Municipality in Innlandet county, Norway. The village is located in the Begnadalen valley, about 25 kilometres (16 mi) to the southeast of the town of Fagernes. The river Begna runs through the village on its way through the Valdres region. The river has a 16-metre (52 ft) tall waterfall at Bagn. The European route E16 highway passes through the village on its way between Bergen and Oslo.

The 0.86-square-kilometre (210-acre) village has a population (2024) of 616 and a population density of 716 inhabitants per square kilometre (1,850/sq mi).

Bagn Church is located in the village. The Valdrestunet mall and the Bagn Bygdesamling museaum are both located in the area as well. The 13th-century Reinli Stave Church lies about 5 kilometres (3.1 mi) to the west of the village. During World War II, there were some major battles in the Bagn area in April 1940, with a national memorial site at Bagnsbergatn.
