= Ål Church =

Ål Church may refer to several churches in Norway:

- Ål Church (Gran), a church in Gran municipality in Innlandet county
- Ål Church (Buskerud), a church in Ål municipality in Buskerud county
- Nordre Ål Church (Northern Ål Church), a church in Lillehammer municipality in Innlandet county
- Søre Ål Church (Southern Ål Church), a church in Lillehammer municipality in Innlandet county
