= Nordseter Church =

Church in Innlandet, Norway

- Nordseter fjellkirke
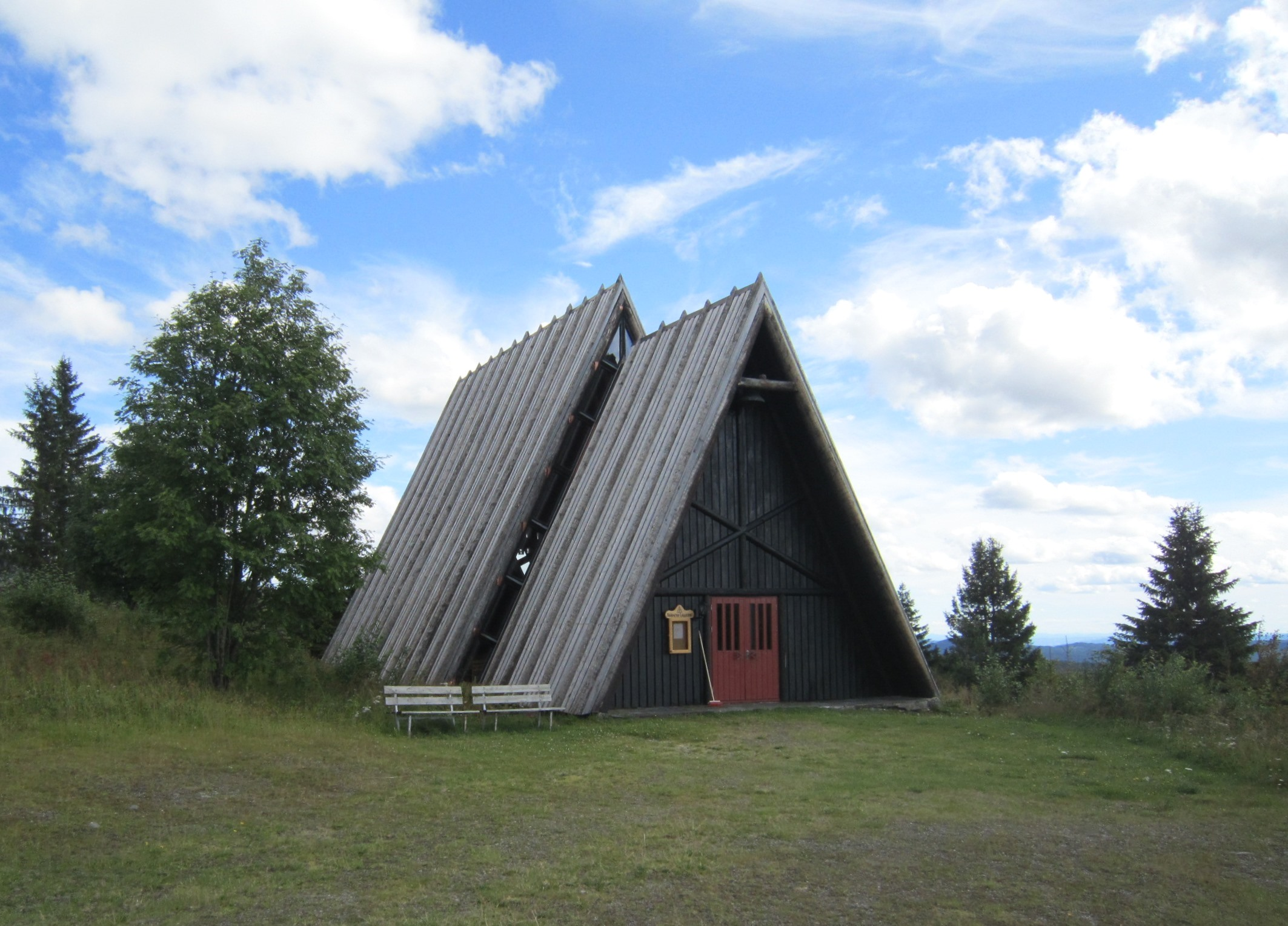
- View of the church
- Nordseter Church
- 61°10′31″N 10°37′02″E
- Location: Lillehammer Municipality, Innlandet
- Country: Norway
- Denomination: Church of Norway
- Churchmanship: Evangelical Lutheran

History
- Status: Chapel
- Founded: 1964
- Consecrated: 15 March 1964

Architecture
- Functional status: Active
- Architect: Erling Viksjø
- Architectural type: Long church
- Completed: 1964 (62 years ago)

Specifications
- Capacity: 160
- Materials: Wood

Administration
- Diocese: Hamar bispedømme
- Deanery: Sør-Gudbrandsdal prosti
- Parish: Nordre Ål
- Norwegian Cultural Heritage Site
- Type: Church
- Status: Not protected
- ID: 85165

Nordseter Church (Norwegian: Nordseter fjellkirke) is a chapel of the Church of Norway in Lillehammer Municipality in Innlandet county, Norway. It is located in the village of Nordseter. It is an annex chapel for the Nordre Ål parish which is part of the Sør-Gudbrandsdal prosti (deanery) in the Diocese of Hamar. The brown, wooden church was built in a long church design in 1964 using plans drawn up by the architect Erling Viksjø. The church seats about 160 people.

== History ==
The push for building a mountain church at Nordseter is said to date back to 1937, but it took almost three decades of meetings, planning and fundraising before the project was realized. In 1949, an architectural competition was held and won by Erling Viksjø. Viksjø later made a model that was shown in different contexts, so that people could form a picture of how it would all be. Land had been purchased a couple of years earlier. However, it seems that the church cause was dormant until the beginning of the 1960s. The church was built in 1963-1964 and it was consecrated on 15 March 1964 by Bishop Kristian Vilhelm Koren Schjelderup Jr. It is an annex chapel under the Nordre Ål Church. In 2009, the church got a new roof. In 2014, a 20-square-metre (220 sq ft) addition was added on the south side of the building.

== See also ==
- List of churches in Hamar
