= List of churches in Hamar =

Map of the deaneries within the Diocese of Hamar

The list of churches in Hamar is a list of the Church of Norway churches in the Diocese of Hamar in Norway. It includes all of the parishes in Innlandet county plus the parishes in Lunner Municipality in Akershus county. The diocese is based at the Hamar Cathedral in the city of Hamar in Hamar Municipality.

The list is divided into several sections, one for each deanery (prosti; headed by a provost) in the diocese. Administratively within each deanery, the churches within each municipality elects their own church council (fellesråd). Each municipality may have one or more parishes (sokn) within the municipality. Each parish elects their own councils (soknerådet). Each parish has one or more local church. The number and size of the deaneries and parishes has changed over time.

The Diocese of Hamar was first established in 1153 when Norway was part of the Catholic Church. During the Reformation in Norway, in 1537, the diocese was incorporated into the Diocese of Christiania. In 1864, the Diocese of Hamar was re-established and at that time, it included all of Hedmark and Oppland counties. Originally, the diocese was divided into Hedemarken prosti (later Hamar domprosti), Gudbrandsdalen prosti, Valdres prosti, and Hadeland, Ringerike og Hallingdal prosti. Over the years, the various deaneries have been subdivided and changed. Currently, there are 10 deaneries. On 1 January 2020, the two counties were merged into Innlandet county except for Lunner Municipality and Jevnaker Municipality which were merged into Viken county, so the diocese includes all of Innlandet plus the two municipalities in Viken (Akershus county after 2024). As of 2018, the 52,589-square-kilometre (20,305 sq mi) diocese had 308,697 members (about 82% of the population). In 2022, the churches in Jevnaker Municipality were transferred to the Diocese of Tunsberg.

== Hamar domprosti ==
This arch-deanery (Norwegian: domprosti) covers several municipalities in the central part of the diocese. It includes the municipalities of Hamar, Løten, and Stange. The arch-deanery is headquartered at the Hamar Cathedral in the city of Hamar in Hamar Municipality.

The churches in Ringsaker Municipality had its own deanery, Ringsaker prosti, from 2007 until 2025 during which time it was separated from the Hamar domprosti. The deanery was headquartered at Ringsaker Church in the village of Moelv in Ringsaker Municipality. The deanery was merged back into Hamar domprosti on 1 January 2025.

Municipality	Parish (sokn)	Church	Location	Year built	Photo
Hamar	Hamar	Hamar Cathedral	Hamar	1866	
Hamar	Hamar	Storhamar Church	Hamar	1975	
Hamar	Vang	Vang Church	Ridabu	1810	
Hamar	Vang	Øvre Vang Church	Slemsrud	1907	
Løten	Løten	Løten Church	Løten	c. 1200	
Løten	Løten	Oppegård Chapel	Oppegård	1886	
Løten	Løten	Oset Chapel	Oset	1885	
Ringsaker	Brumunddal/Veldre	Brumunddal Church	Brumunddal	1965	
Ringsaker	Brumunddal/Veldre	Veldre Church	Byflaten	2000	
Ringsaker	Brøttum	Brøttum Church	Brøttum	1790	
Ringsaker	Brøttum	Mesnali Church	Mesnali	1933	
Ringsaker	Furnes	Furnes Church	Furnes	1707	
Ringsaker	Nes	Helgøya Church	Helgøya	1870	
Ringsaker	Nes	Nes Church	Tingnes	1250	
Ringsaker	Nes	Stavsjø Church	Stavsjø	1880	
Ringsaker	Ringsaker	Ringsaker Church	Moelv	1100s	
Ringsaker	Åsmarka	Åsmarka Church	Åsmarka	1859	
Stange	Ottestad	Ottestad Church	Ottestad	1731	
Stange	Romedal	Romedal Church	Romedal	1887	
Stange	Stange	Stange Church	Stangebyen	1250	
Stange	Tangen	Strandlykkja Church	Strandlykkja	1915	
Stange	Tangen	Tangen Church	Tangen	1861	
Stange	Vallset	Vallset Church	Vallset	1850	

== Hadeland og Land prosti ==
This deanery (Norwegian: prosti) covers several municipalities in the southern part of the diocese. It is the only deanery in the diocese to span parts of two counties. It includes the municipalities of Gran, Nordre Land, and Søndre Land in Innlandet county and Lunner Municipality in Akershus county. The deanery is headquartered at Ål Church in the village of Jaren in Gran Municipality.

The deanery was established in 1864 when Jevnaker Municipality and Lunner Municipality from the Hadeland, Ringerike og Hallingdal prosti and Nordre Land Municipality and Søndre Land Municipality from the Valdres prosti were joined to form the newly-created Hadeland og Land prosti. The churches in Jevnaker Municipality were transferred to the Ringerike prosti in the Diocese of Tunsberg on 1 January 2022.

Municipality	Parish (sokn)	Church	Location	Year built	Photo
Gran	Bjoneroa	Sørum Church	Bjoneroa	1861	
Gran	Brandbu	Nes Church	Røykenvik	1730	
Gran	Gran/Tingelstad	Grymyr Church	Grymyr	2003	
Gran	Gran/Tingelstad	St. Mary's Church	Granavollen	c. 1150	
Gran	Gran/Tingelstad	St. Nicholas' Church	Granavollen	c. 1150	
Gran	Gran/Tingelstad	Tingelstad Church	Tingelstad	1866	
Gran	Gran/Tingelstad	Old Tingelstad Church	Tingelstad	c. 1220	
Gran	Moen/Ål	Moen Church	Jaren	1914	
Gran	Moen/Ål	Ål Church	Gran	1929	
Lunner	Grua/Harestua	Grua Church	Grua	1924	
Lunner	Grua/Harestua	Harestua Chapel	Harestua	2001	
Lunner	Lunner	Lunner Church	Lunner	12th century	
Lunner	Lunner	Oppdalen Chapel	Oppdalen	1914	
Nordre Land	Lunde	Lunde Church	Lunde	1769	
Nordre Land	Nordsinni	Haugner Church	Nordsinni	1950	
Nordre Land	Nordsinni	Nordsinni Church	Nordsinni	1758	
Nordre Land	Torpa	Kinn Church	Aust-Torpa	1956	
Nordre Land	Torpa	Åmot Church	Fagerlund	1823	
Nordre Land	Østsinni	Østsinni Church	Dokka	1877	
Nordre Land	Østsinni	Vølstad Church	Vølstad	1959	
Søndre Land	Fluberg	Fluberg Church	Fluberg	1703	
Søndre Land	Fluberg	Landåsbygda Church	Landåsbygda	1965	
Søndre Land	Skute	Skute Church	Ringelia	1915	
Søndre Land	Søndre Land	Enger Church	Enger	1875	
Søndre Land	Søndre Land	Hov Church	Hov	1781	

== Nord-Gudbrandsdal prosti ==
This deanery (Norwegian: prosti) covers several municipalities in the northwestern part of the diocese. It includes churches in the municipalities of Dovre, Lesja, Lom, Nord-Fron, Sel, Skjåk, and Vågå. The deanery is headquartered at Sel Church in the north side of the town of Otta in Sel Municipality.

The deanery was established in 1871 when the old Gudbrandsdalen prosti was divided into Søndre Gudbrandsdalen prosti and Nordre Gudbrandsdalen prosti. A royal resolution on 19 May 1922 changed the deanery name from "Nordre Gudbrandsdal prosti" to "Nord-Gudbrandsdal prosti", both meaning "northern Gudbrandsdalen". Also in 1922, Sel municipality was transferred out of this deanery to the new Midtre Gudbrandsdal prosti ("middle Gudbrandsdal"). In 1972, the Midtre Gudbrandsdal prosti was dissolved and Sel Municipality and Fron Municipality were transferred into this deanery at that time.

Municipality	Parish (sokn)	Church	Location	Year built	Photo
Dovre	Dombås	Dombås Church	Dombås	1939	
Dovre	Dombås	Eystein Church	Hjerkinn	1969	
Dovre	Dovre	Dovre Church	Dovre	1736	
Lesja	Lesja og Lesjaskog	Lesja Church	Lesja	1749	
Lesja	Lesja og Lesjaskog	Lesjaskog Church	Lesjaskog	1697	
Lesja	Lesja og Lesjaskog	Lesjaverk Church	Lesjaverk	1964	
Lom	Bøverdalen	Bøverdal Church	Galdesanden (Bøverdal)	1864	
Lom	Garmo	Garmo Church	Garmo	1879	
Lom	Lom	Lom Stave Church	Fossbergom	c. 1185	
Nord-Fron	Kvam	Kvam Church	Kvam	1952	
Nord-Fron	Kvikne	Kvikne Church	Kvikne	1764	
Nord-Fron	Skåbu	Skåbu Church	Skåbu	1927	
Nord-Fron	Sødorp	Sødorp Church	Vinstra	1752	
Nord-Fron	Sødorp	Sødorp Chapel	Vinstra	1929	
Sel	Heidal	Heidal Church	Bjølstad	1941	
Sel	Nord-Sel	Nord-Sel Church	Nord-Sel	1932	
Sel	Sel	Sel Church	Selsverket	1742	
Sel	Sel	Sjoa Chapel	Sjoa	1978	
Skjåk	Nordberg	Nordberg Church	Nordberg	1864	
Skjåk	Skjåk	Skjåk Church	Skjåk	1752	
Vågå	Vågå	Vågå Church	Vågåmo	c. 1625	

== Nord-Østerdal prosti ==
This deanery (Norwegian: prosti) covers several municipalities in the northeastern part of the diocese. It includes the municipalities of Alvdal, Folldal, Os, Rendalen, Tolga, and Tynset. The deanery is headquartered at Tynset Church in the town of Tynset in Tynset Municipality.

The deanery was established in 1868 when the old Østerdalen prosti was divided into Søndre Østerdalen prosti and Nordre Østerdalen prosti. A royal resolution on 19 May 1922 changed the deanery name from "Nordre Østerdalen prosti" to "Nord-Østerdal prosti", both meaning "northern Østerdalen".

Municipality	Parish (sokn)	Church	Location	Year built	Photo
Alvdal	Alvdal	Alvdal Church	Alvdal	1861	
Folldal	Folldal	Folldal Church	Folldal	1882	
Folldal	Folldal	Egnund Chapel	Einabu	1975	
Folldal	Øvre Folldal	Dalen Church	Dalholen	1934	
Os	Dalsbygda	Dalsbygda Church	Dalsbygda	1960	
Os	Narbuvoll	Narbuvoll Church	Narbuvoll	1862	
Os	Narbuvoll	Tufsingdalen Church	Tufsingdal	1920	
Os	Os	Os Church	Os i Østerdalen	1862	
Rendalen	Hanestad	Hanestad Church	Hanestad	1926	
Rendalen	Sjøli	Sjøli Church	Sjølisand	1914	
Rendalen	Ytre Rendal	Ytre Rendal Church	Otnes	1751	
Rendalen	Øvre Rendal	Øvre Rendal Church	Bergset	1759	
Tolga	Hodalen	Hodalen Church	Hodalen	1934	
Tolga	Holøydalen	Holøydalen Church	Øversjødalen	1908	
Tolga	Tolga	Tolga Church	Tolga	1840	
Tolga	Vingelen	Vingelen Church	Vingelen	1880	
Tynset	Brydalen	Brydalen Church	Brydalen	1883	
Tynset	Kvikne	Kvikne Church	Kvikne	1654	
Tynset	Tylldalen	Tylldalen Church	Tylldalen	1736	
Tynset	Tynset	Tynset Church	Tynset	1795	

== Solør, Vinger og Odal prosti ==
This deanery (Norwegian: prosti) covers several municipalities in the Glåmdal river valley in the southeastern part of the diocese. It includes the municipalities of Eidskog, Kongsvinger, Nord-Odal, Sør-Odal, Grue, Våler, and Åsnes. The deanery is headquartered at Vinger Church in the town of Kongsvinger in Kongsvinger Municipality.

The deanery was established in 1855 when the old Øvre Romerike prosti was divided. It was originally called Solør and Odal prosti. In 1868, northern part of Solør (Våler and Åsnes parishes) was transferred to the then newly established Sør-Østerdal prosti. In 1922, the southern part of Solør (Hof, Grue, and Brandval parishes) were separated to join the newly created Solør prosti. The remaining parts of this deanery then changed its name to Vinger og Odal prosti. In 1990, the parish of Brandval was transferred from Solør prosti to Vinger og Odal prosti. In 2013, the deanery regained its original boundaries when the old Solør prosti was merged back. The deanery's name was then changed to Solør, Vinger og Odal prosti.

Municipality	Parish (sokn)	Church	Location	Year built	Photo
Eidskog	Eidskog	Eidskog Church	Matrand	1665	
Eidskog	Eidskog	Magnor Church	Magnor	1923	
Eidskog	Vestmarka	Vestmarka Church	Vestmarka	1883	
Grue	Grue	Grue Church	Kirkenær	1825	
Grue	Grue Finnskog	Grue Finnskog Church	Svullrya	1886	
Kongsvinger	Austmarka	Austmarka Church	Austmarka	1858	
Kongsvinger	Brandval	Brandval Church	Brandval	1651	
Kongsvinger	Brandval	Lundersæter Church	Lundersæter	1868	
Kongsvinger	Brandval	Roverud Church	Roverud	1969	
Kongsvinger	Vinger	Vinger Church	Kongsvinger	1699	
Nord-Odal	Mo	Mo Church	Mo	1864	
Nord-Odal	Sand	Sand Church	Sand	1891	
Nord-Odal	Sand	Trøftskogen Chapel	Trautskogen	1931	
Sør-Odal	Oppstad	Oppstad Church	Oppstad	1725	
Sør-Odal	Strøm	Strøm Church	Strøm	1857	
Sør-Odal	Ullern	Ullern Church	Ullern	1868	
Våler	Gravberget	Gravberget Church	Gravberget	1955	
Våler	Våler	Våler Church	Våler	2015	
Våler	Våler	Risberget Chapel	Risberget	1862	
Åsnes	Arneberg	Arneberg Church	Jammerdalen	1878	
Åsnes	Gjesåsen	Gjesåsen Church	Gjesåsen	1863	
Åsnes	Hof	Hof Church	Hof	1861	
Åsnes	Hof Finnskog	Hof Finnskog Church	Dulpetorpet	1953	
Åsnes	Åsnes	Åsnes Church	Flisa	1744	
Åsnes	Åsnes Finnskog	Åsnes Finnskog Church	Vermundsjøen	1861	

== Sør-Gudbrandsdal prosti ==
This deanery (Norwegian: prosti) covers several municipalities in central part of the diocese. It includes the municipalities of Gausdal, Lillehammer, Ringebu, Sør-Fron, and Øyer. The deanery is headquartered at Lillehammer Church in the town of Lillehammer in Lillehammer Municipality.

The deanery was established in 1871 when the old Gudbrandsdalen prosti was divided into Nordre Gudbrandsdalen prosti and Søndre Gudbrandsdalen prosti. A royal resolution on 19 May 1922 changed the deanery name from "Søndre Gudbrandsdal prosti" to "Sør-Gudbrandsdal prosti", both meaning "southern Gudbrandsdalen". Also in 1922, Ringebu municipality was transferred out of this deanery to the new Midtre Gudbrandsdal prosti ("middle Gudbrandsdal"). In 1972, the Midtre Gudbrandsdal prosti was dissolved and the municipality of Ringebu was transferred into this deanery.

Municipality	Parish (sokn)	Church	Location	Year built	Photo
Gausdal	Aulstad	Aulstad Church	Aulstad	1864	
Gausdal	Follebu	Follebu Church	Follebu	1260	
Gausdal	Svatsum	Svatsum Church	Svatsum	1860	
Gausdal	Vestre Gausdal	Vestre Gausdal Church	Forset	1784	
Gausdal	Østre Gausdal	Østre Gausdal Church	Prestgarden (north of Segalstad bru)	1250	
Lillehammer	Fåberg	Fåberg Church	Fåberg	1727	
Lillehammer	Lillehammer	Lillehammer Church	Lillehammer	1882	
Lillehammer	Nordre Ål	Nordre Ål Church	Lillehammer	1994	
Lillehammer	Nordre Ål	Nordseter Church	Nordseter	1964	
Lillehammer	Saksumdal	Saksumdal Church	Saksumdalen	1875	
Lillehammer	Søre Ål	Søre Ål Church	Lillehammer	1964	
Lillehammer	Vingrom	Vingrom Church	Vingrom	1908	
Ringebu	Fåvang	Fåvang Stave Church	Fåvang	1630	
Ringebu	Fåvang	Fåvangfjellet Chapel	Gulhaugsætra	1974	
Ringebu	Ringebu	Ringebu Stave Church	Ringebu	c. 1220	
Ringebu	Venabygd	Venabygd Church	Venabygd	1780	
Ringebu	Venabygd	Venabygd Chapel	Venabu	1979	
Sør-Fron	Sør-Frøn	Sør-Fron Church	Hundorp	1792	
Sør-Fron	Sør-Frøn	Espedalen Chapel	Espedalen	1974	
Øyer	Tretten	Tretten Church	Tretten	1728	
Øyer	Øyer	Øyer Church	Tingberg	1725	

== Sør-Østerdal prosti ==
This deanery (Norwegian: prosti) covers several municipalities in the east-central part of the diocese. It includes the municipalities of Elverum, Engerdal, Stor-Elvdal, Trysil, Åmot. The deanery is headquartered at Elverum Church in the town of Elverum in Elverum Municipality.

The deanery was established in 1868 when the old Østerdalen prosti was divided into Søndre Østerdalen prosti and Nordre Østerdalen prosti. A royal resolution on 19 May 1922 changed the deanery name from "Søndre Østerdalen prosti" to "Sør-Østerdal prosti", both meaning "southern Østerdalen".

Municipality	Parish (sokn)	Church	Location	Year built	Photo
Elverum	Elverum	Elverum Church	Elverum	1736	
Elverum	Heradsbygd	Heradsbygd Church	Heradsbygd	1895	
Elverum	Hernes	Hernes Church	Hernes	1935	
Elverum	Nordskogbygda	Nordskogbygda Church	Nordskogbygda	1873	
Elverum	Sørskogbygda	Sørskogbygda Church	Sørskogbygda	1873	
Engerdal	Drevsjø	Drevsjø Church	Drevsjø	1848	
Engerdal	Elgå	Elgå Church	Elgå	1946	
Engerdal	Engerdal	Engerdal Church	Engerdal	1873	
Engerdal	Sømådal	Sømådal Church	Sømådal	1937	
Engerdal	Søre Elvdal	Søre Elvdal Church	Nymoen	1885	
Stor-Elvdal	Atneosen	Atneosen Church	Atna	1882	
Stor-Elvdal	Sollia	Sollia Church	Sollia	1738	
Stor-Elvdal	Stor-Elvdal	Evenstad Church	Evenstad	1904	
Stor-Elvdal	Stor-Elvdal	Koppang Church	Koppang	1952	
Stor-Elvdal	Stor-Elvdal	Stor-Elvdal Church	Negardshaugen	1821	
Stor-Elvdal	Strand	Strand Church	Strand	1863	
Trysil	Ljørdalen	Ljørdalen Church	Ljørdalen	1872	
Trysil	Nordre Trysil	Nordre Trysil Church	Jordet	2000	
Trysil	Søre Trysil	Plassen Church	Plassen	1907	
Trysil	Søre Osen	Søre Osen Church	Søre Osen	1882	
Trysil	Trysil	Trysil Church	Innbygda	1861	
Trysil	Tørberget	Tørberget Church	Tørberget	1922	
Trysil	Østby	Østby Church	Østby	1940	
Åmot	Deset	Deset Church	Deset	1867	
Åmot	Nordre Osen	Nordre Osen Church	Osneset	1923	
Åmot	Nordre Osen	Old Nordre Osen Church	Osneset	1777	
Åmot	Åmot	Åmot Church	Rena	1901	

== Toten prosti ==
This deanery (Norwegian: prosti) covers three municipalities in the southern part of the diocese. It includes the municipalities of Gjøvik, Vestre Toten, and Østre Toten. The deanery is headquartered at Gjøvik Church in the town of Gjøvik in Gjøvik Municipality. The deanery was established in 1853 when the old Toten og Valdres prosti was divided into Valdres prosti and Toten prosti.

Municipality	Parish (sokn)	Church	Location	Year built	Photo
Gjøvik	Biri	Biri Church	Biri	1777	
Gjøvik	Bråstad	Bråstad Church	Bråstad	1963	
Gjøvik	Engehaugen	Engehaugen Church	Gjøvik	1994	
Gjøvik	Gjøvik	Gjøvik Church	Gjøvik	1994	
Gjøvik	Hunn	Hunn Church	Hunndalen	1968	
Gjøvik	Snertingdal	Nykirke	Ålset in Snertingdalen	1872	
Gjøvik	Snertingdal	Seegård Church	Seegård	1997	
Gjøvik	Vardal	Vardal Church	Øverbygda	1803	
Vestre Toten	Eina	Eina Church	Eina	1890	
Vestre Toten	Raufoss	Raufoss Church	Raufoss	1939	
Vestre Toten	Ås	Ås Church	Bøverbru	1921	
Østre Toten	Balke	Balke Church	Skreia	1170	
Østre Toten	Balke	Totenviken Church	Totenvika	1896	
Østre Toten	Hoff	Hoff Church	Kraby	c. 1175	
Østre Toten	Kapp	Kapp Church	Kapp	1939	
Østre Toten	Kolbu	Kolbu Church	Kolbu	1730	
Østre Toten	Nordlien	Nordlien Church	Nordlia	1901	

== Valdres prosti ==
This deanery (Norwegian: prosti) covers several municipalities in Valdres in the southwestern part of the diocese. It includes the municipalities of Etnedal, Nord-Aurdal, Sør-Aurdal, Vang, Vestre Slidre, and Øystre Slidre. The deanery is headquartered at Aurdal Church in the village of Aurdal in Nord-Aurdal Municipality.

Valdres prosti was established in 1853 when the old Toten og Valdres prosti was divided into Valdres prosti and Toten prosti. In 1864, Nordre Land Municipality and Søndre Land Municipality were transferred from this deanery to the Hadeland og Land prosti.

Municipality	Parish (sokn)	Church	Location	Year built	Photo
Etnedal	Bruflat	Bruflat Church	Bruflat	1750	
Etnedal	Nord-Etnedal	Nord-Etnedal Church	Brøtahaugen	1866	
Nord-Aurdal	Aurdal	Aurdal Church	Aurdal	1737	
Nord-Aurdal	Skrautvål	Skrautvål Church	Skrautvål	1785	
Nord-Aurdal	Svenes	Strand Church	Synnstrond	1735	
Nord-Aurdal	Tingnes	Tingnes Church	Fagernes	1972	
Nord-Aurdal	Tisleidalen	Tisleidalen Church	Hovda	1957	
Nord-Aurdal	Ulnes	Ulnes Church	Ulnes	1250	
Sør-Aurdal	Bagn	Bagn Church	Bagn	1736	
Sør-Aurdal	Begnadalen	Begnadalen Church	Begnadalen	1964	
Sør-Aurdal	Hedalen	Hedalen Stave Church	Hedalen	c. 1165	
Sør-Aurdal	Leirskogen	Leirskogen Church	Leirskogen	1924	
Sør-Aurdal	Reinli	Reinli Stave Church	Reinli	1326	
Sør-Aurdal	Reinli	Reinli Chapel	Reinli	1964	
Vang	Heensåsen	Heensåsen Church	Hænsgardane	1902	
Vang	Høre	Høre Stave Church	Kvien	1180	
Vang	Vang	Vang Church	Vang i Valdres	1840	
Vang	Øye	Øye Church	Øye	1747	
Vang	Øye	Øye Stave Church	Øye	1965	
Vang	Øye	St. Thomas Church	Filefjell	1971	
Vestre Slidre	Lomen	Lomen Church	Lomen	1914	
Vestre Slidre	Lomen	Lomen Stave Church	Lomen	1179	
Vestre Slidre	Røn	Røn Church	Røn	1747	
Vestre Slidre	Røn	Øyjar Chapel	Øyjar	1963	
Vestre Slidre	Slidre	Vestre Slidre Church	Slidre	c. 1200	
Øystre Slidre	Hegge	Hegge Stave Church	Hegge	1216	
Øystre Slidre	Lidar	Lidar Church	Skammestein	1932	
Øystre Slidre	Rogne	Rogne Church	Rogne	1857	
Øystre Slidre	Volbu	Volbu Church	Volbu	1820	
