= Sjoa Chapel =

Church in Innlandet, Norway

- Sjoa kapell
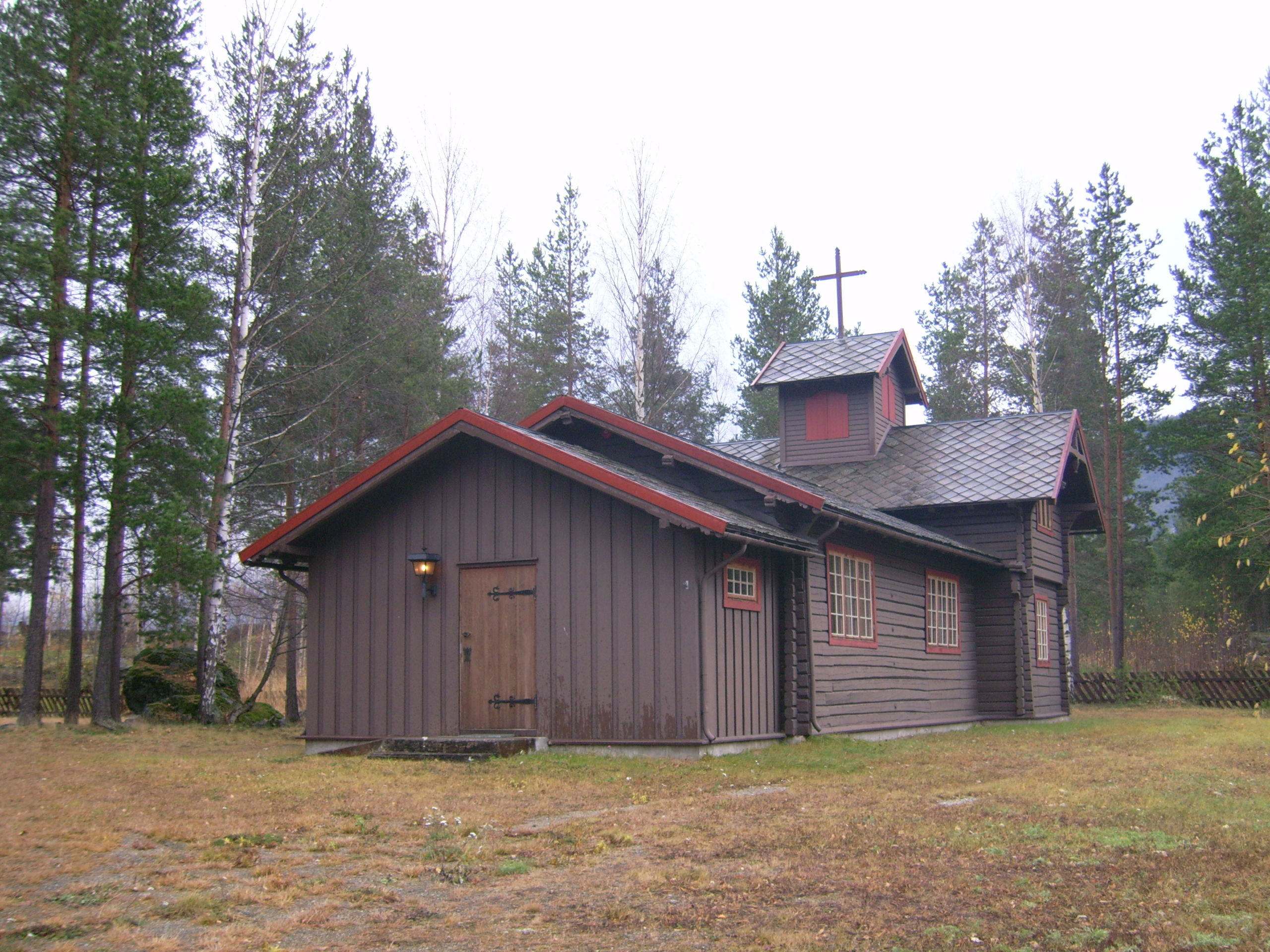
- View of the church
- Sjoa Chapel
- 61°40′45″N 9°32′49″E
- Location: Sel Municipality, Innlandet
- Country: Norway
- Denomination: Church of Norway
- Churchmanship: Evangelical Lutheran

History
- Status: Parish church
- Founded: 1978
- Consecrated: 17 December 1978

Architecture
- Functional status: Active
- Architect: Jon Rukin
- Architectural type: Long church
- Completed: 1978 (48 years ago)

Specifications
- Capacity: 70
- Materials: Wood

Administration
- Diocese: Hamar bispedømme
- Deanery: Nord-Gudbrandsdal prosti
- Parish: Sel

Sjoa Chapel (Norwegian: Sjoa kapell) is a chapel of the Church of Norway in Sel Municipality in Innlandet county, Norway. It is located in the village of Sjoa. It is the annex chapel for the Sel parish which is part of the Nord-Gudbrandsdal prosti (deanery) in the Diocese of Hamar. The brown, wooden church was built in a long church design in 1978 using plans drawn up by the architect Jon Rukin. The church seats about 70 people.

== History ==
As early as the 1930s, people in the village of Sjoa were working towards getting their own chapel so they wouldn't need to travel so far to get to church. In 1947, a church site was purchased. During the 1970s, the old Sjoa Station building that was the local railway station for the Dovrebanen railway was no longer used. The idea came up to move the station to the chapel site and renovate it to be used as a chapel. The railway station had originally been designed by Paul Due in 1896. This building was disassembled and was rebuilt on the chapel site in 1977-1978 under the leadership of Jon Rukin. The old building was rebuilt as it was plus the addition of a choir and sacristy on the north end and a small tower with a cross above the two-story church porch on the south end. The new Sjoa Chapel was consecrated by the Bishop Georg Hille on 17 December 1978.

== See also ==
- List of churches in Hamar
