= Begnadalen Church =

Church in Innlandet, Norway

- Begnadalen kirke
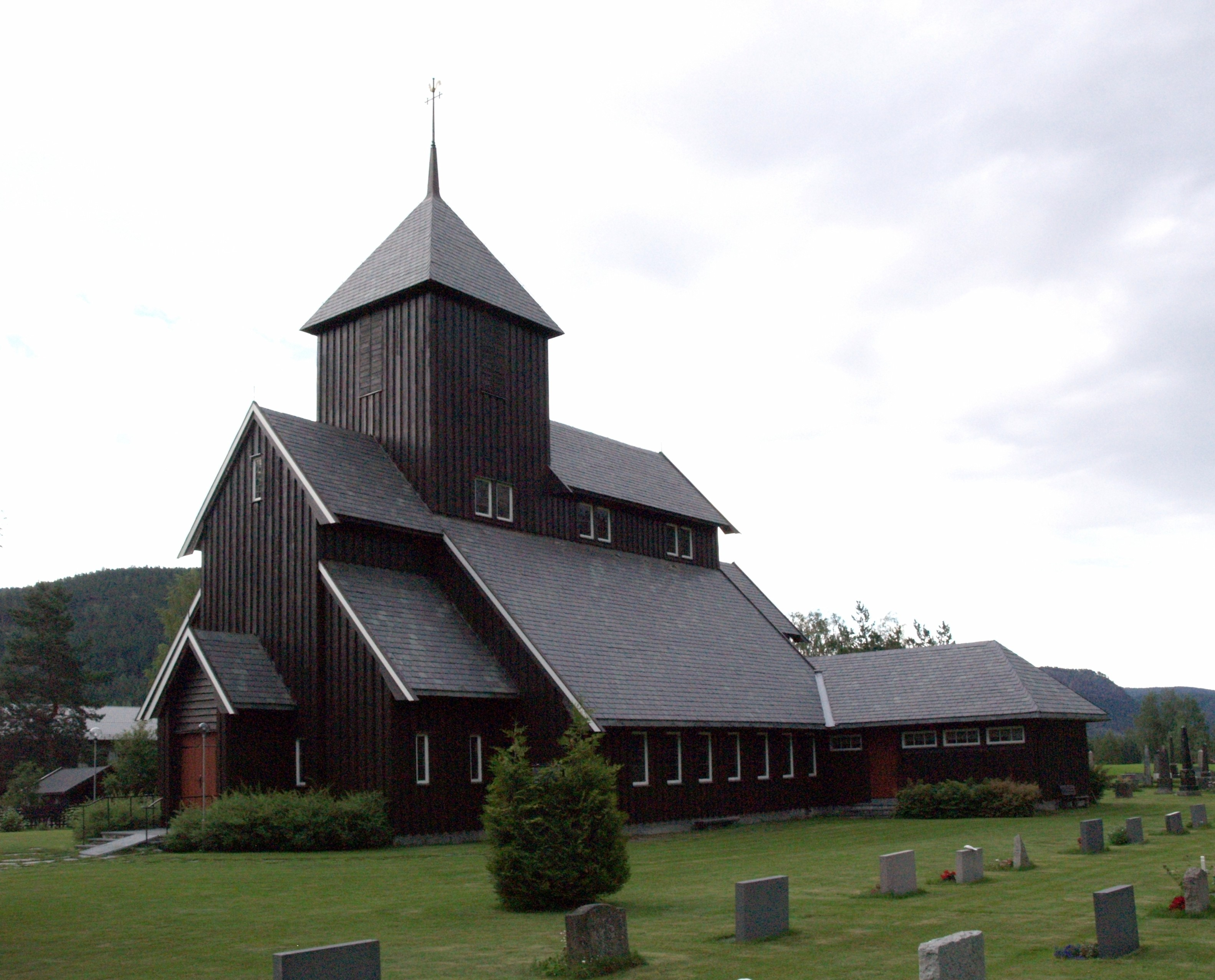
- View of the church Credit: John Erling Blad
- Begnadalen Church
- 60°38′52″N 9°47′01″E
- Location: Sør-Aurdal, Innlandet
- Country: Norway
- Denomination: Church of Norway
- Churchmanship: Evangelical Lutheran

History
- Former name: Nedre Hedalen kirke
- Status: Parish church
- Founded: 1859
- Consecrated: 13 September 1964

Architecture
- Functional status: Active
- Architect(s): Arnstein Arneberg and Per Solemslie
- Architectural type: Long church
- Completed: 1964 (62 years ago)

Specifications
- Capacity: 240
- Materials: Wood

Administration
- Diocese: Hamar bispedømme
- Deanery: Valdres prosti
- Parish: Begnadalen
- Norwegian Cultural Heritage Site
- Type: Church
- Status: Not protected
- ID: 83857

Begnadalen Church (Norwegian: Begnadalen kirke) is a parish church of the Church of Norway in Sør-Aurdal Municipality in Innlandet county, Norway. It is located in the village of Begnadalen. It is the church for the Begnadalen parish which is part of the Valdres prosti (deanery) in the Diocese of Hamar. The brown, wooden church was built in a long church design in 1964 using plans drawn up by the architects Arnstein Arneberg and Per Solemslie. The church seats about 240 people.

== History ==
The first church in Begnadalen was constructed in 1859 using designs by the architect Christian Heinrich Grosch. The church was a wooden octagonal building. This church burned down in 1957 after receiving electric heating the year before. After the fire, planning soon began for building a new church. The new church would be built about 30 metres (98 ft) west of the old church site. The new church was designed by Arnstein Arneberg and Per Solemslie. The lead builder was Ola Svendsen from Begnadalen. The building is a wooden long church with a rectangular nave and a smaller chancel on the east end. The nave and chancel have a stave church-inspired raised middle section. On the south side of the choir there is a wing with a sacristy, meeting rooms and side rooms. The new church was consecrated on 13 September 1964.

== Media gallery ==
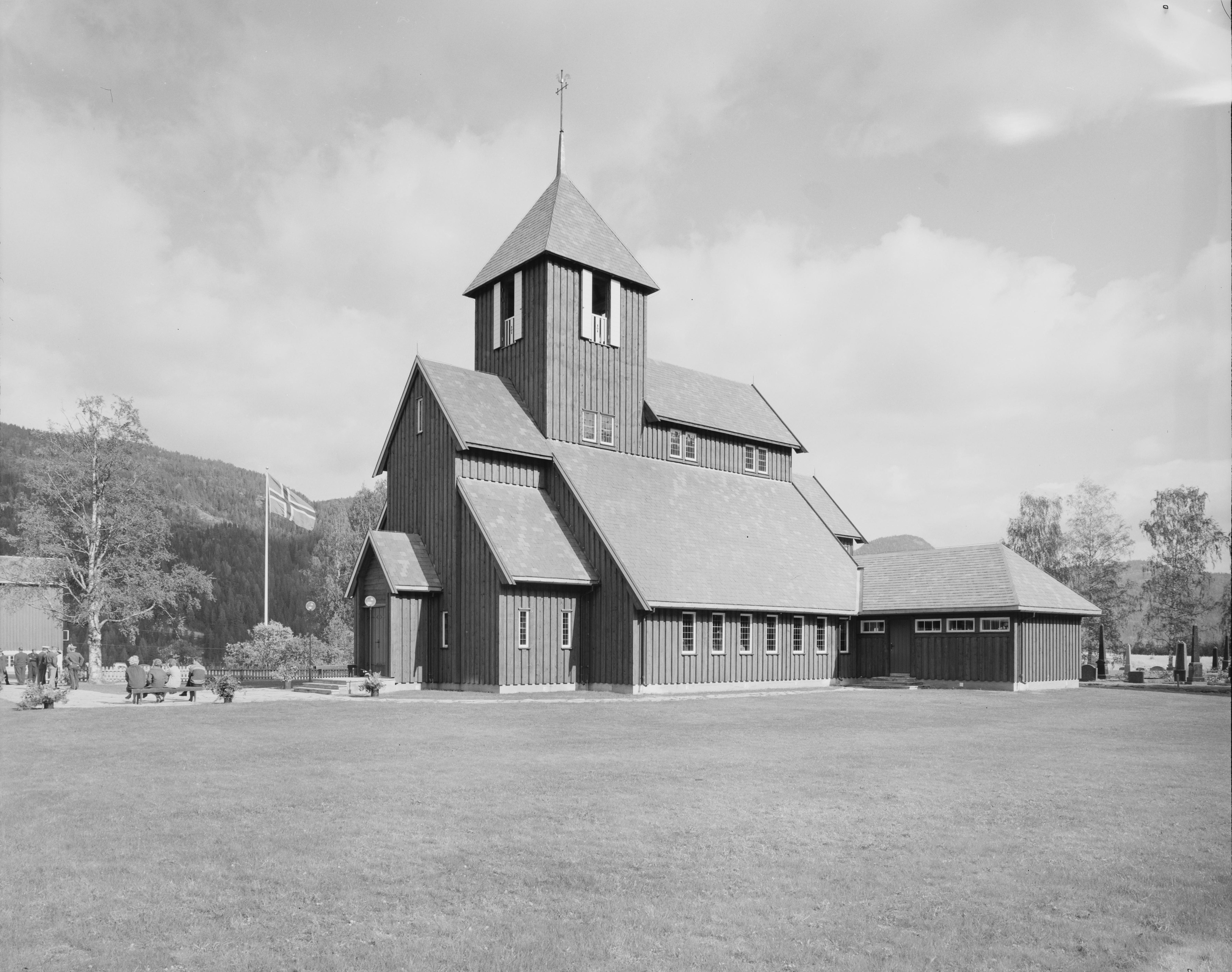
View of the present church

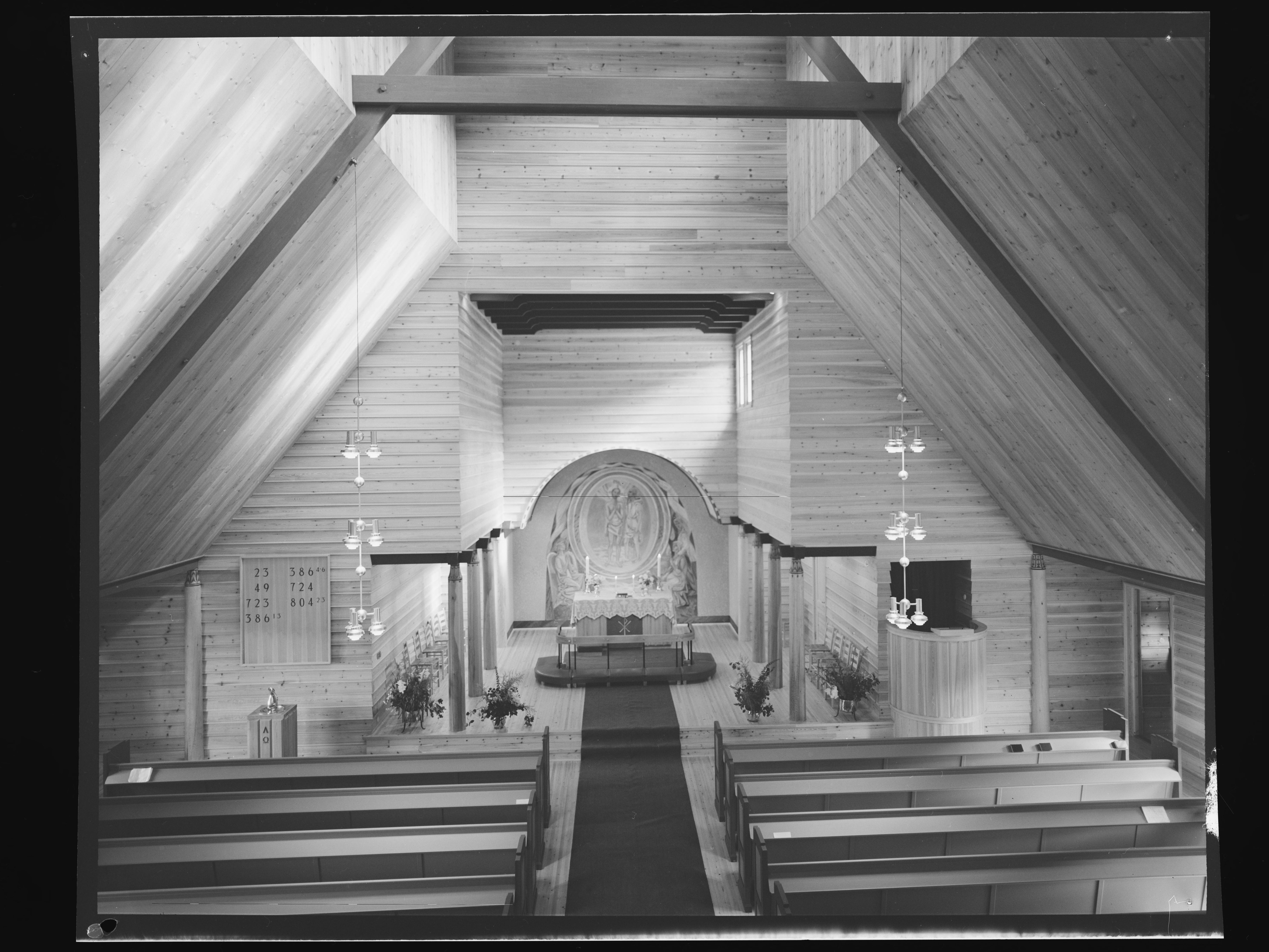
Interior of the present church

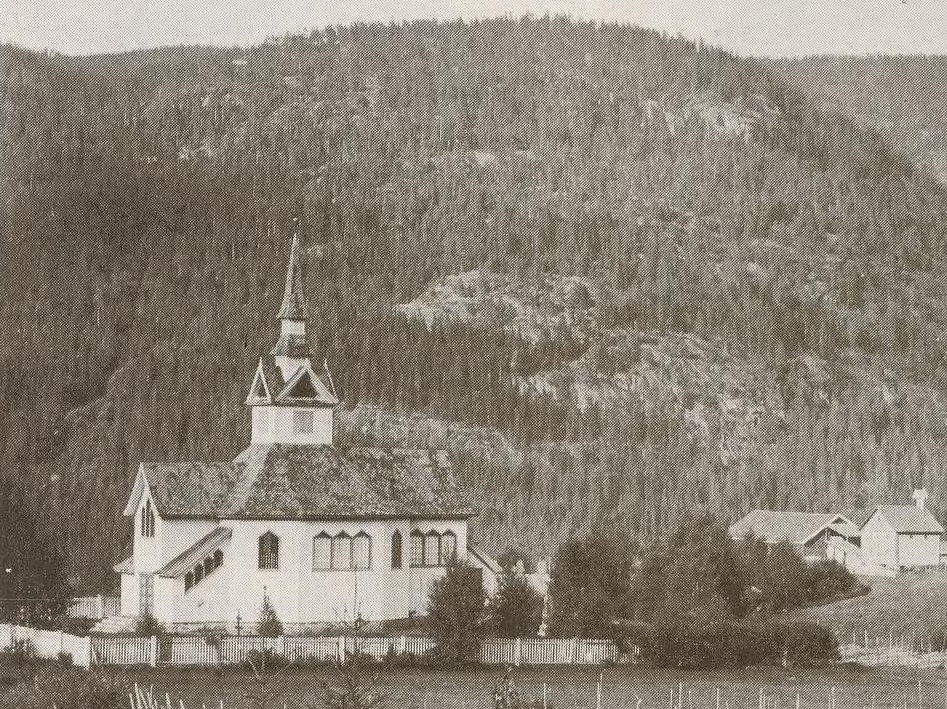
View of the old church (1859–1957)

== See also ==
- List of churches in Hamar
