= Øvre Rendal Church =

Church in Innlandet, Norway

- Øvre Rendal kirke
- Bergset kirke
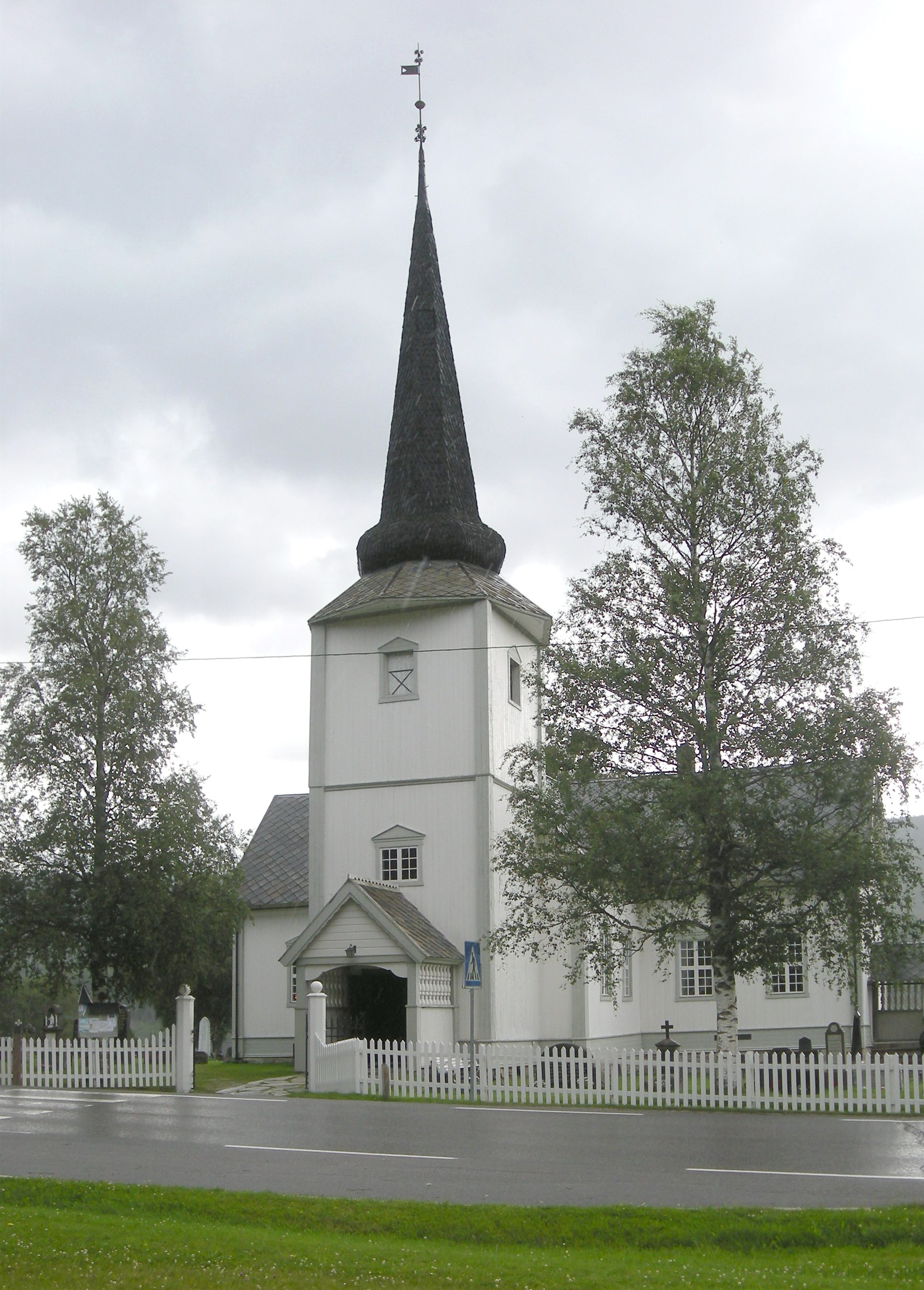
- View of the church
- Øvre Rendal Church
- 61°53′22″N 11°04′43″E
- Location: Rendalen Municipality, Innlandet
- Country: Norway
- Denomination: Church of Norway
- Previous denomination: Catholic Church
- Churchmanship: Evangelical Lutheran

History
- Status: Parish church
- Founded: 13th century
- Consecrated: 19 July 1761

Architecture
- Functional status: Active
- Architectural type: Cruciform
- Completed: 1759 (267 years ago)

Specifications
- Capacity: 280
- Materials: Wood

Administration
- Diocese: Hamar bispedømme
- Deanery: Nord-Østerdal prosti
- Parish: Øvre Rendal
- Norwegian Cultural Heritage Site
- Type: Church
- Status: Automatically protected
- ID: 85926

Øvre Rendal Church (Norwegian: Øvre Rendal kirke) is a parish church of the Church of Norway in Rendalen Municipality in Innlandet county, Norway. It is located in the village of Bergset. It is the church for the Øvre Rendal parish which is part of the Nord-Østerdal prosti (deanery) in the Diocese of Hamar. The white, wooden church was built in an cruciform design in 1759 using plans drawn up by an unknown architect. The church seats about 280 people.

== History ==
The first church in Bergset was a wooden stave church that was likely built during the 13th century. Not much is known about that building. A 13th-century crucifix that formerly hung in that church is still in existence today. Around 1665, the old church was torn down and replaced with a new church on the same site. In 1759, the old church was torn down and a new church was built on the same site soon afterwards. It was a timber-framed cruciform church. The new church was consecrated on 19 July 1761.

In 1814, this church served as an election church (Norwegian: valgkirke). Together with more than 300 other parish churches across Norway, it was a polling station for elections to the 1814 Norwegian Constituent Assembly which wrote the Constitution of Norway. This was Norway's first national elections. Each church parish was a constituency that elected people called "electors" who later met together in each county to elect the representatives for the assembly that was to meet at Eidsvoll Manor later that year.

== Media gallery ==
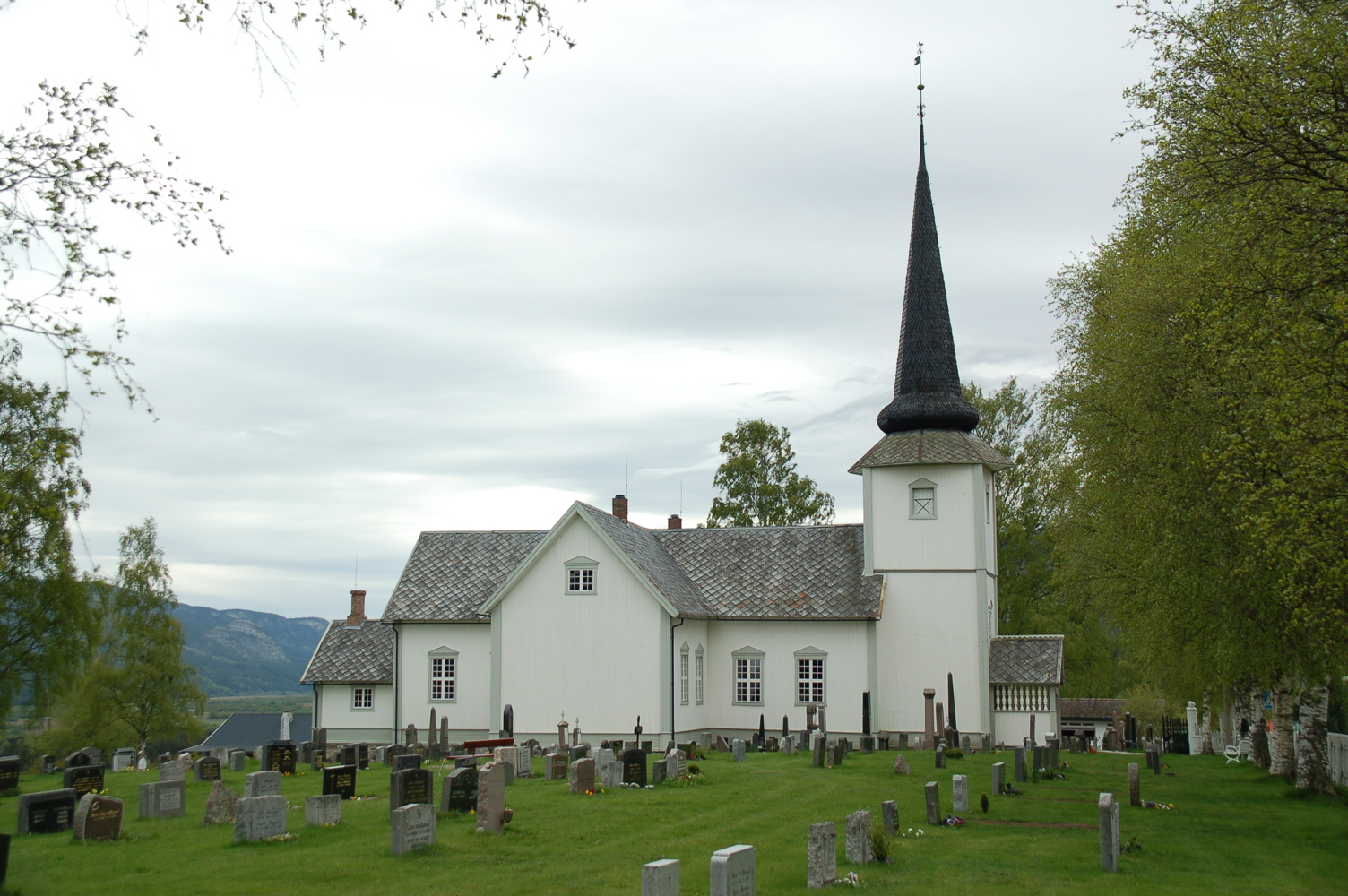

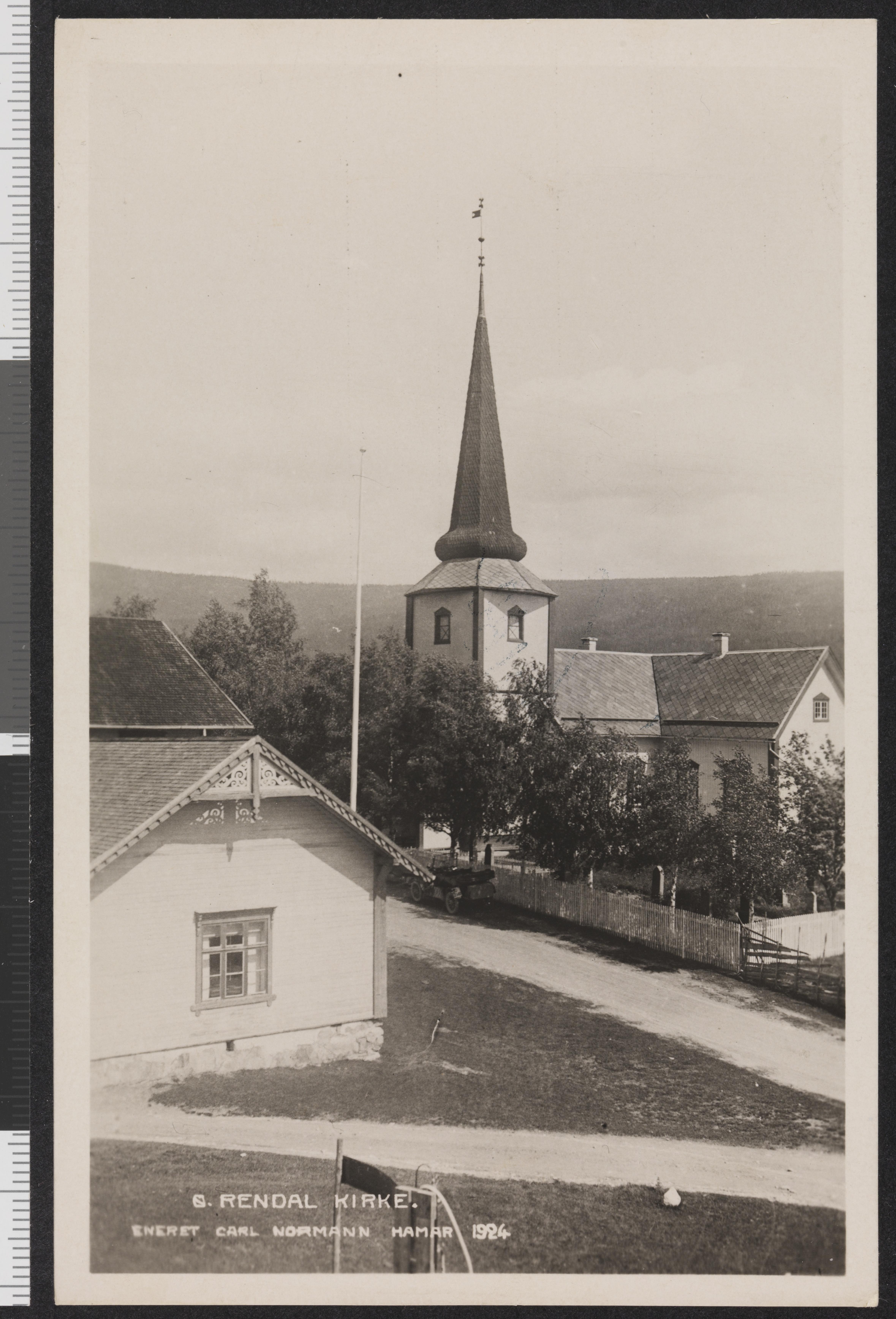

== See also ==
- List of churches in Hamar
