= Bøverdal Church =

Church in Innlandet, Norway

- Bøverdal kyrkje
- Galde kyrkje
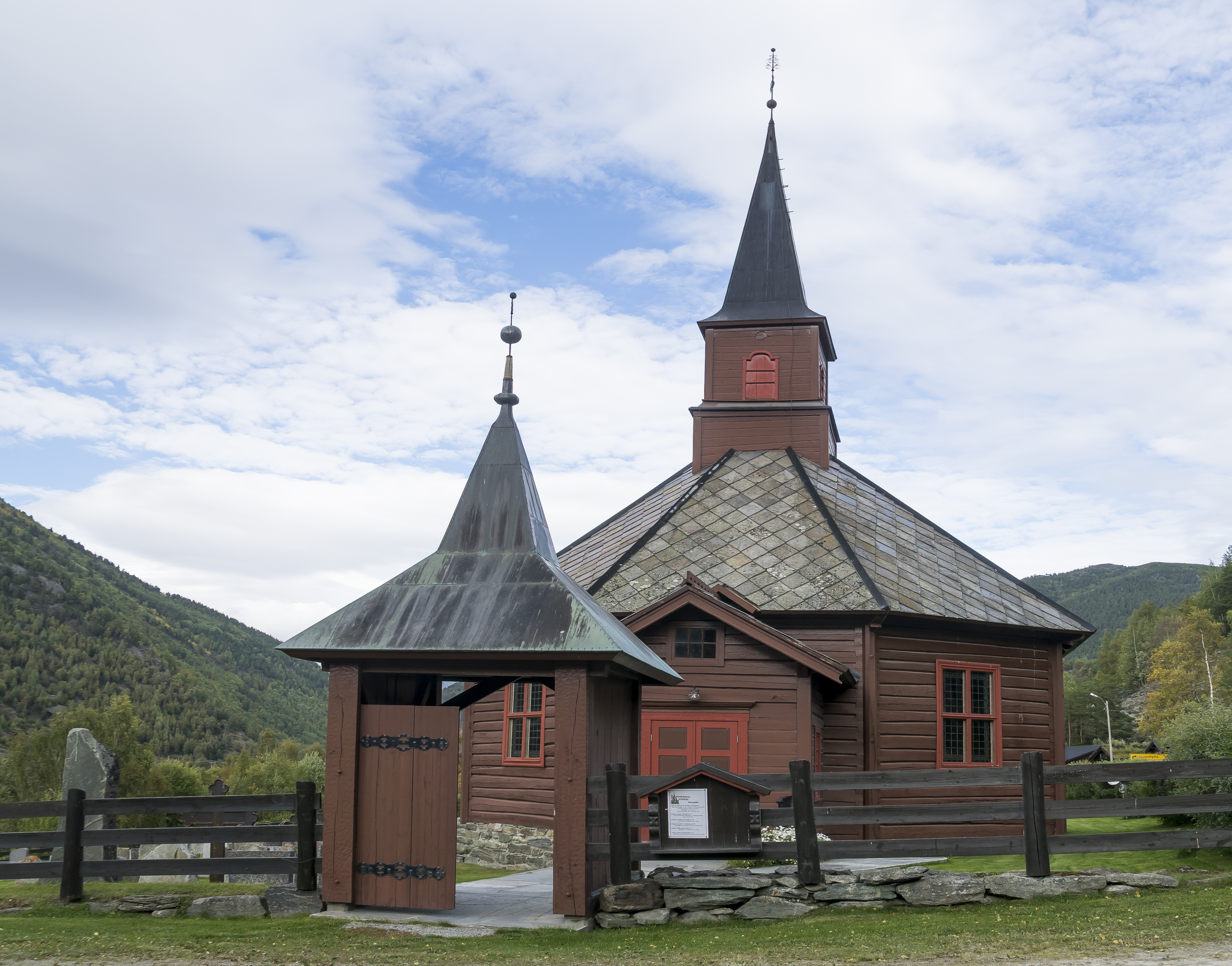
- View of the church
- Bøverdal Church
- 61°43′11″N 8°20′40″E
- Location: Lom Municipality, Innlandet
- Country: Norway
- Denomination: Church of Norway
- Churchmanship: Evangelical Lutheran

History
- Status: Parish church
- Founded: 14th century
- Consecrated: 22 August 1864

Architecture
- Functional status: Active
- Architect: Erik Pedersen Rusten
- Architectural type: Octagonal
- Completed: 1864 (162 years ago)
- Closed: c. 1500s-1864

Specifications
- Capacity: 125
- Materials: Wood

Administration
- Diocese: Hamar bispedømme
- Deanery: Nord-Gudbrandsdal prosti
- Parish: Bøverdal
- Norwegian Cultural Heritage Site
- Type: Church
- Status: Not protected
- ID: 84003

Bøverdal Church (Norwegian: Bøverdal kyrkje) is a parish church of the Church of Norway in Lom Municipality in Innlandet county, Norway. It is located in the village of Galdesanden. It is the church for the Bøverdal parish which is part of the Nord-Gudbrandsdal prosti (deanery) in the Diocese of Hamar. The brown, wooden church was built in an octagonal design in 1864 using plans drawn up by the architect Erik Pedersen Rusten. The church seats about 125 people.

== History ==
The first church in Galdesanden was likely a wooden stave church that was built during the 14th century. That building was a farm chapel for the Bøverdalen valley. Probably during the 1500s, the church was destroyed by a large flood. The village was then without a church for several hundred years. It was not until the 1860s that a new church was built, designed by farmer Erik Pedersen Rusten, who was a driving force for church building for many years. The lead builder was Jakob Jonsen Storlien from Dovre Municipality. The foundation wall was begun in the autumn of 1862, and the church was consecrated on 22 August 1864. The new building is a timber-framed octagonal church.

== Media gallery ==
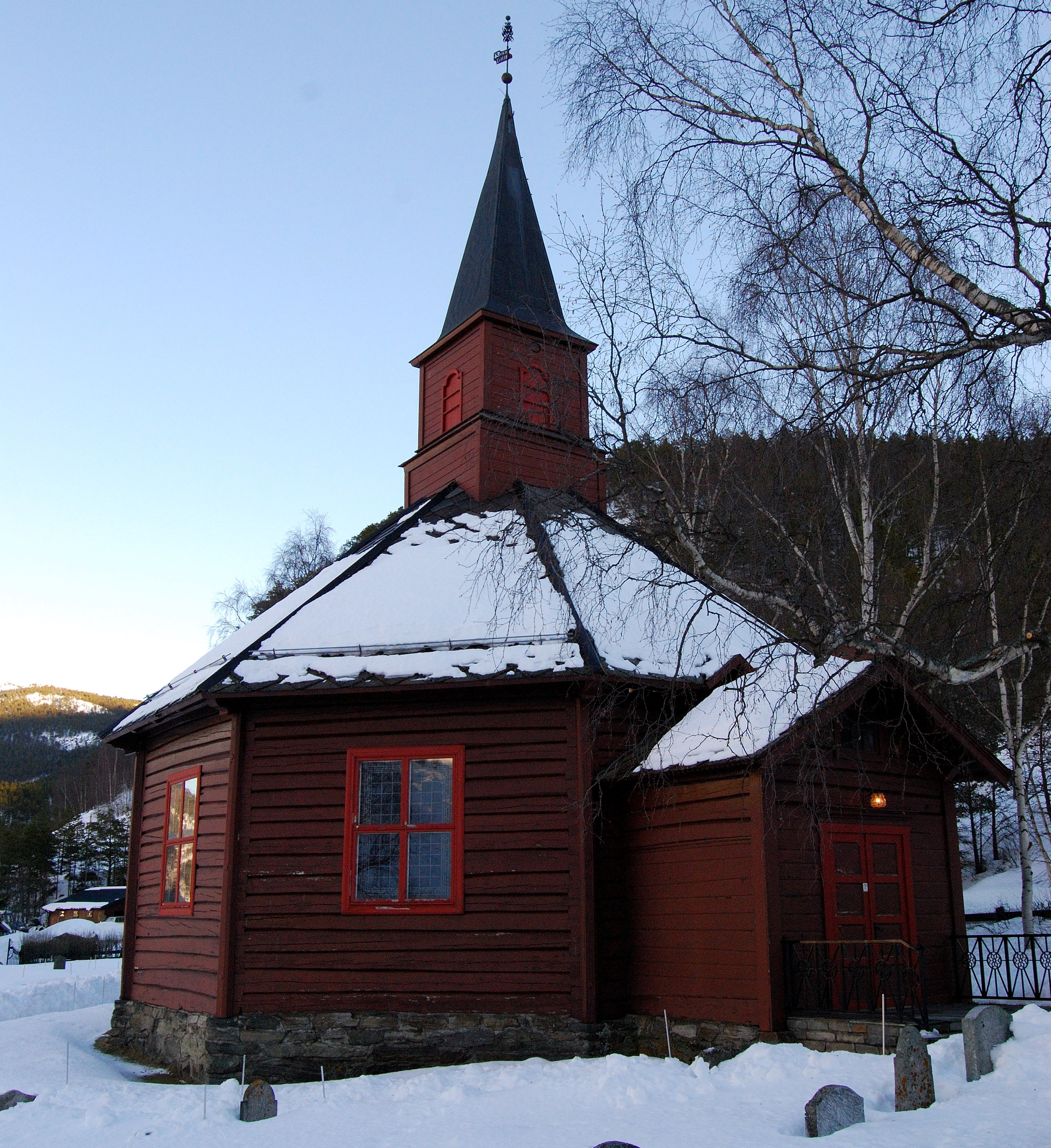

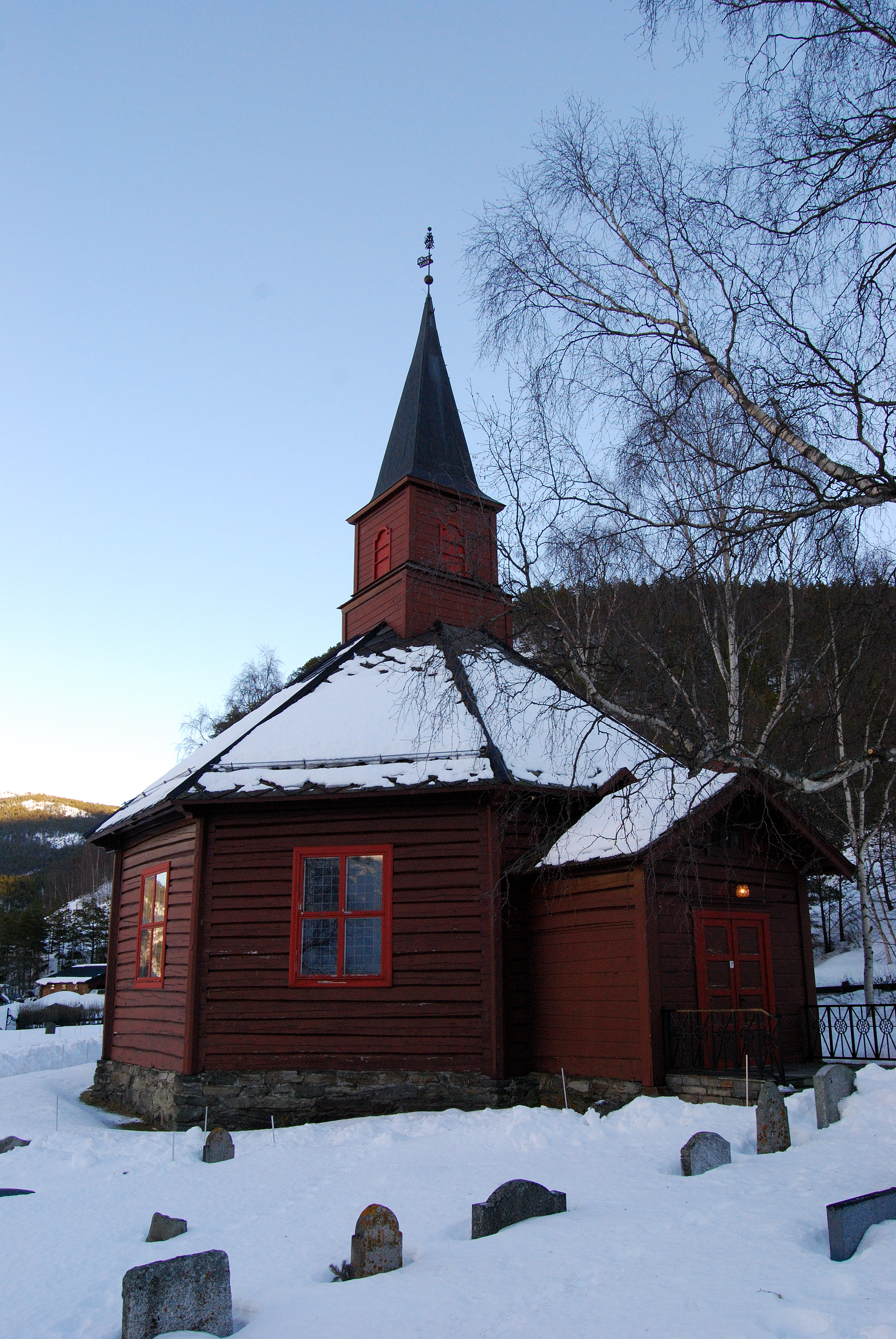

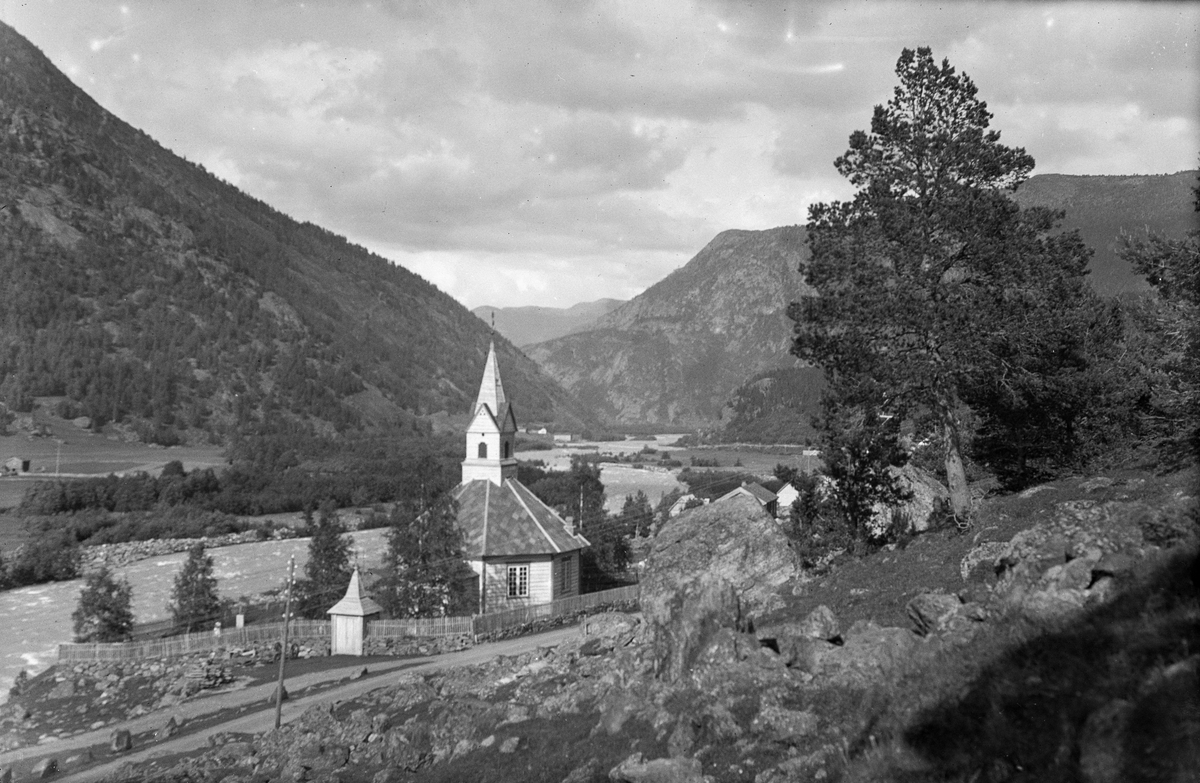

== See also ==
- List of churches in Hamar
