= Veldre Church =

Church in Innlandet, Norway

- Veldre kirke
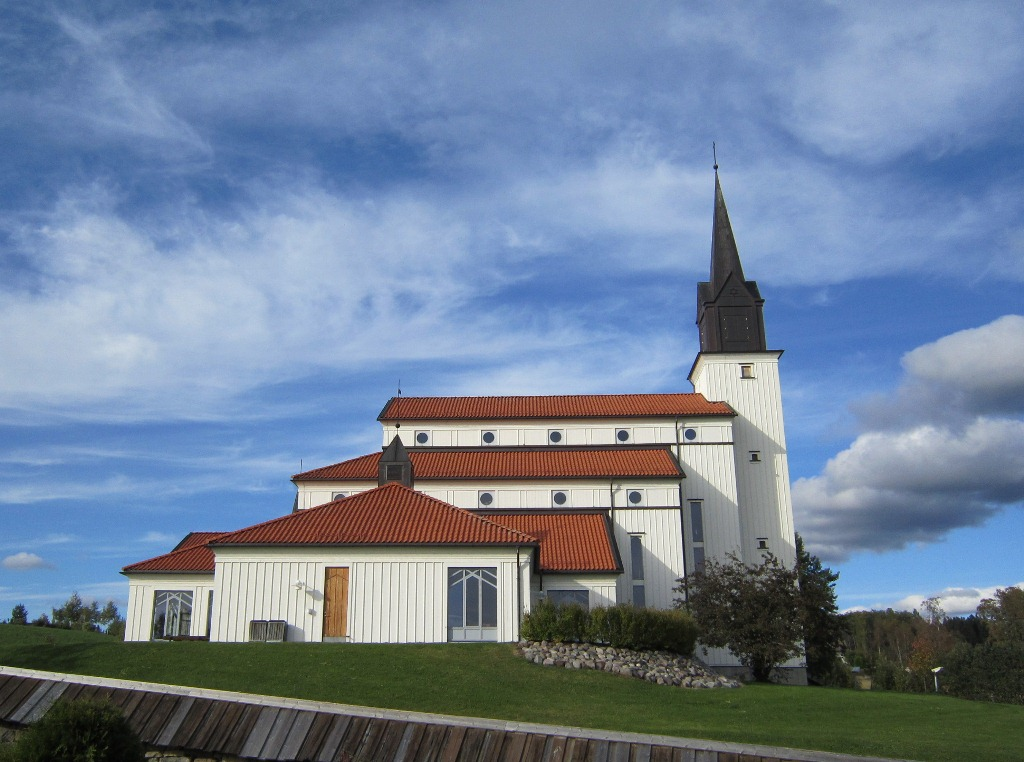
- View of the church
- Veldre Church
- 60°55′02″N 10°53′26″E
- Location: Ringsaker Municipality, Innlandet
- Country: Norway
- Denomination: Church of Norway
- Previous denomination: Catholic Church
- Churchmanship: Evangelical Lutheran

History
- Status: Parish church
- Founded: 13th century
- Consecrated: 19 March 2000

Architecture
- Functional status: Active
- Architect(s): Ulf Zettersten and Roar Jacobsen
- Architectural type: Long church
- Completed: 2000 (26 years ago)

Specifications
- Capacity: 275
- Materials: Wood

Administration
- Diocese: Hamar bispedømme
- Deanery: Ringsaker prosti
- Parish: Bromunddal/Veldre
- Norwegian Cultural Heritage Site
- Type: Church
- Status: Not protected
- ID: 85799

Veldre Church (Norwegian: Veldre kirke) is a parish church of the Church of Norway in Ringsaker Municipality in Innlandet county, Norway. It is located in the village of Byflaten. It is one of the churches for the Bromunddal/Veldre parish which is part of the Ringsaker prosti (deanery) in the Diocese of Hamar. The white, wooden church was built in a long church design in 2000 using plans drawn up by the architects Ulf Zettersten and Roar Jacobsen. The church seats about 275 people.

== History ==
The earliest existing historical records of the church date back to the year 1332, but the church was not new that year. The first church here was a wooden stave church that was probably built during the 13th century. This church was probably located at Flisaker, a short distance to the southeast of the present site of the church. Around the year 1615, a new church porch and sacristy were added to the building. After an inspection in 1665, the church was found to be too small and in poor condition, so it was repaired and expanded around that time. A new pulpit and baptismal font were also added at that time.

By the early 1700s, the church was deemed to be in such poor condition that it needed to be replaced. Knud Bergoust was hired to build the new church in the central part of the present day graveyard. Construction of the new half-timbered cruciform church took place in 1725–1726. It had a sacristy on the north side of the choir and a tower in the center of the nave roof. The new building was consecrated on 29 September 1726 (Michaelmas) by the Bishop Bartholomæus Deichman. This church seated about 400 people. (The old church at Flisaker was not torn down until 1776.) In 1755, the church received exterior siding. In 1867, a new, taller tower was built. In 1914, the nave was expanded by adding 3 metres (9.8 ft) to the west end to accommodate a new organ. In 1969, the sacristy was expanded. On 28 September 1996, the church burned down, possibly due to an electrical problem. A lot of the historical artwork and furniture was lost in the fire.

Planning for a new church began soon after the old church and rubble was cleared. Ulf Zettersten, from Nyköping, Sweden and Roar Jacobsen from Gjøvik, Norway were hired to design the new church. It was decided to build the new church about 75 metres (246 ft) north of the old church site, just outside the graveyard wall. The new, large wooden long church was designed to look like historical churches, but it has many modern characteristics as well. The church has a 30-metre (98 ft) tall tower on the east end, above the choir. It also has a small 30-seat octagonal chapel near the main entrance. The new building was consecrated on 19 March 2000 by the Bishop Rosemarie Köhn.

== Media gallery ==
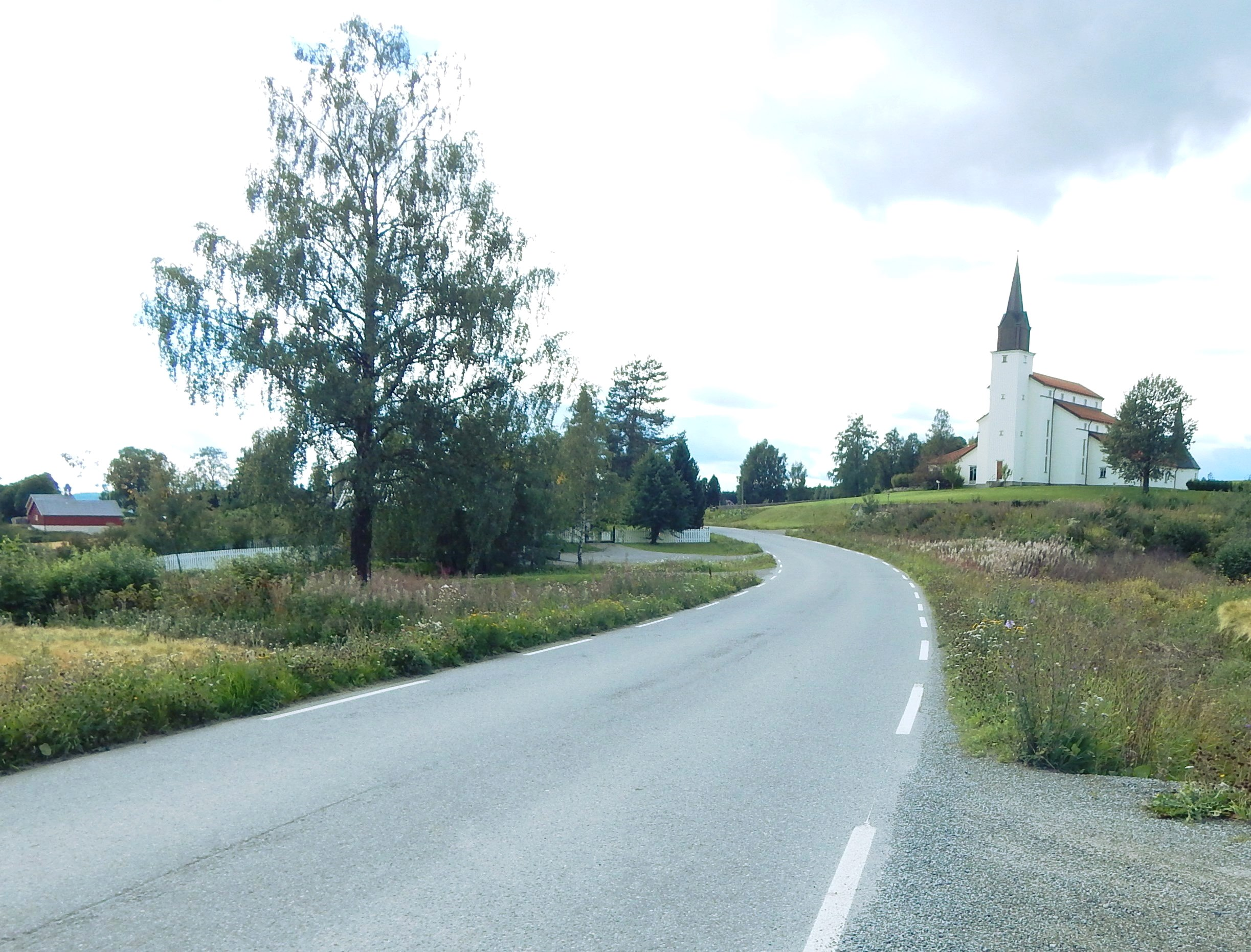
View of the present church

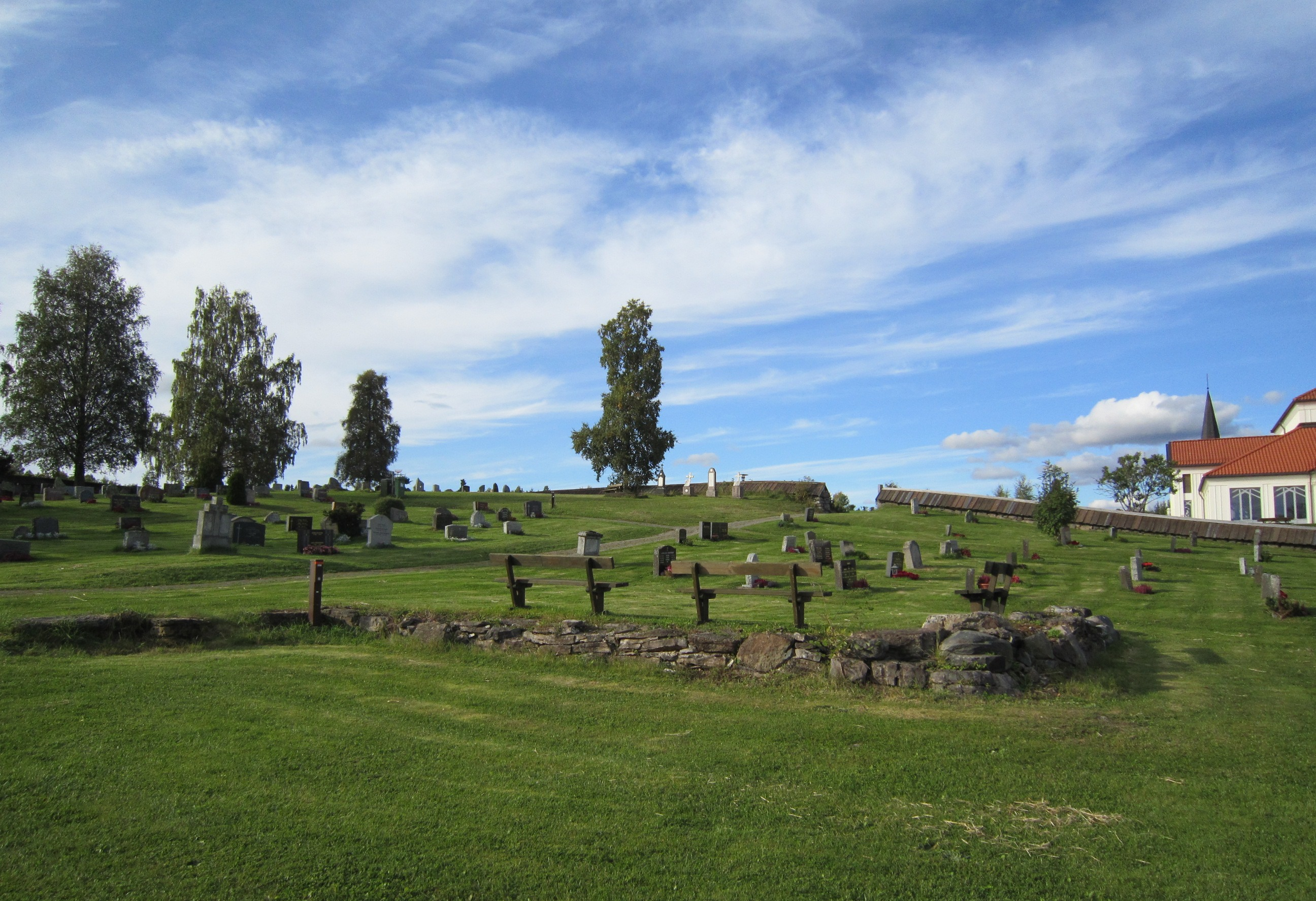
View of the present church and graveyard

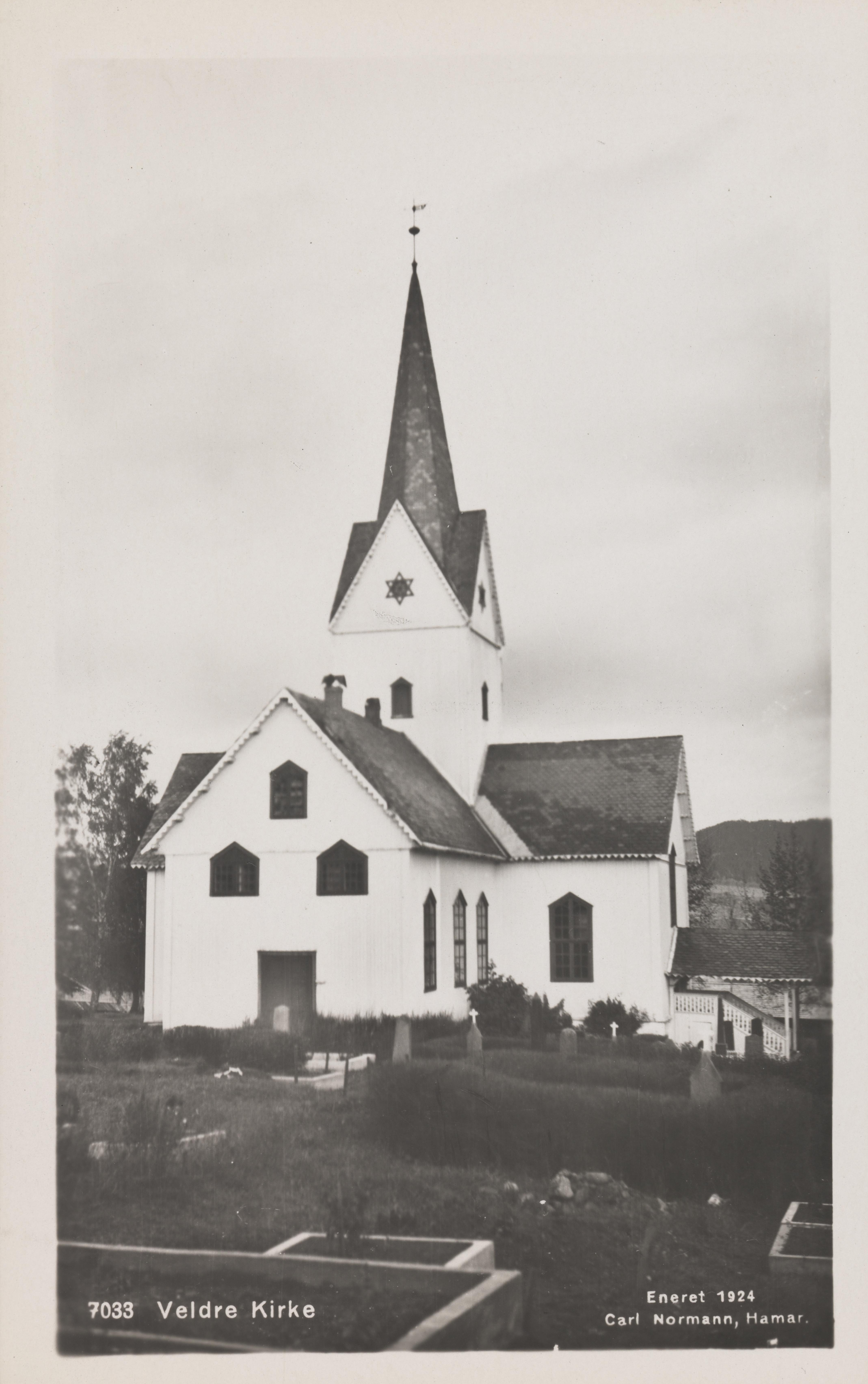
Old church (1726-1996)

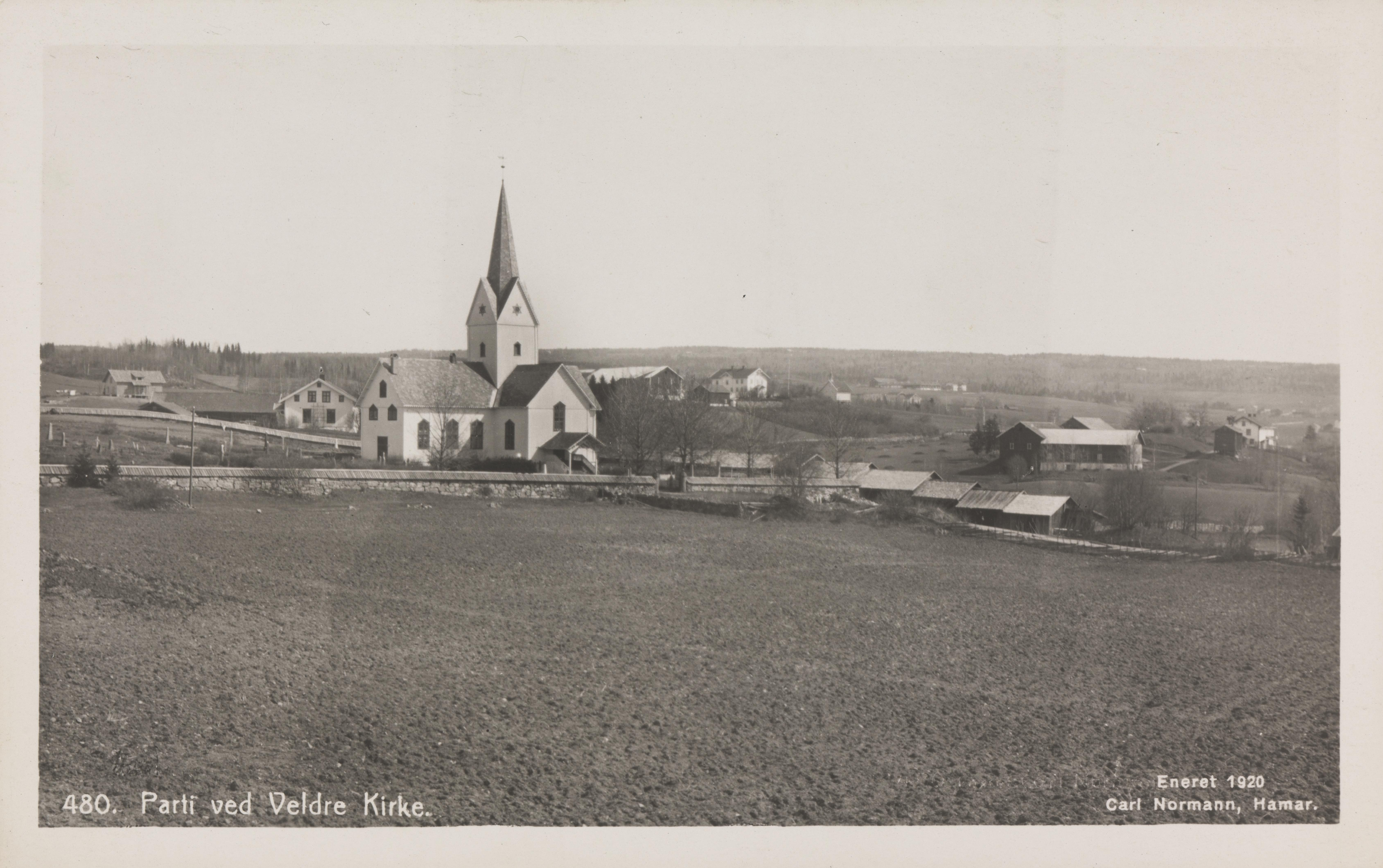
Old church (1726-1996)

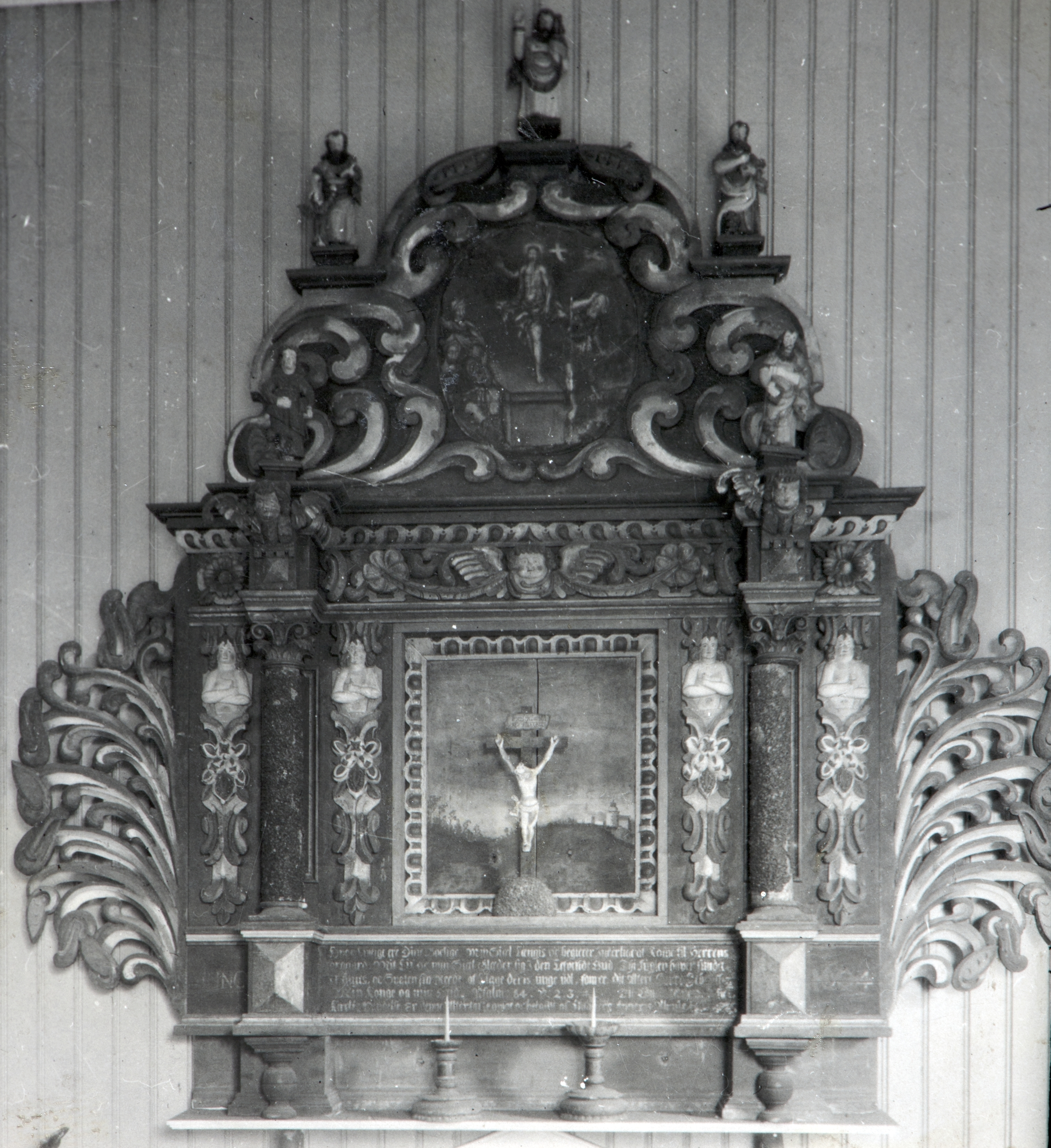
Interior of the old church (1726-1996)

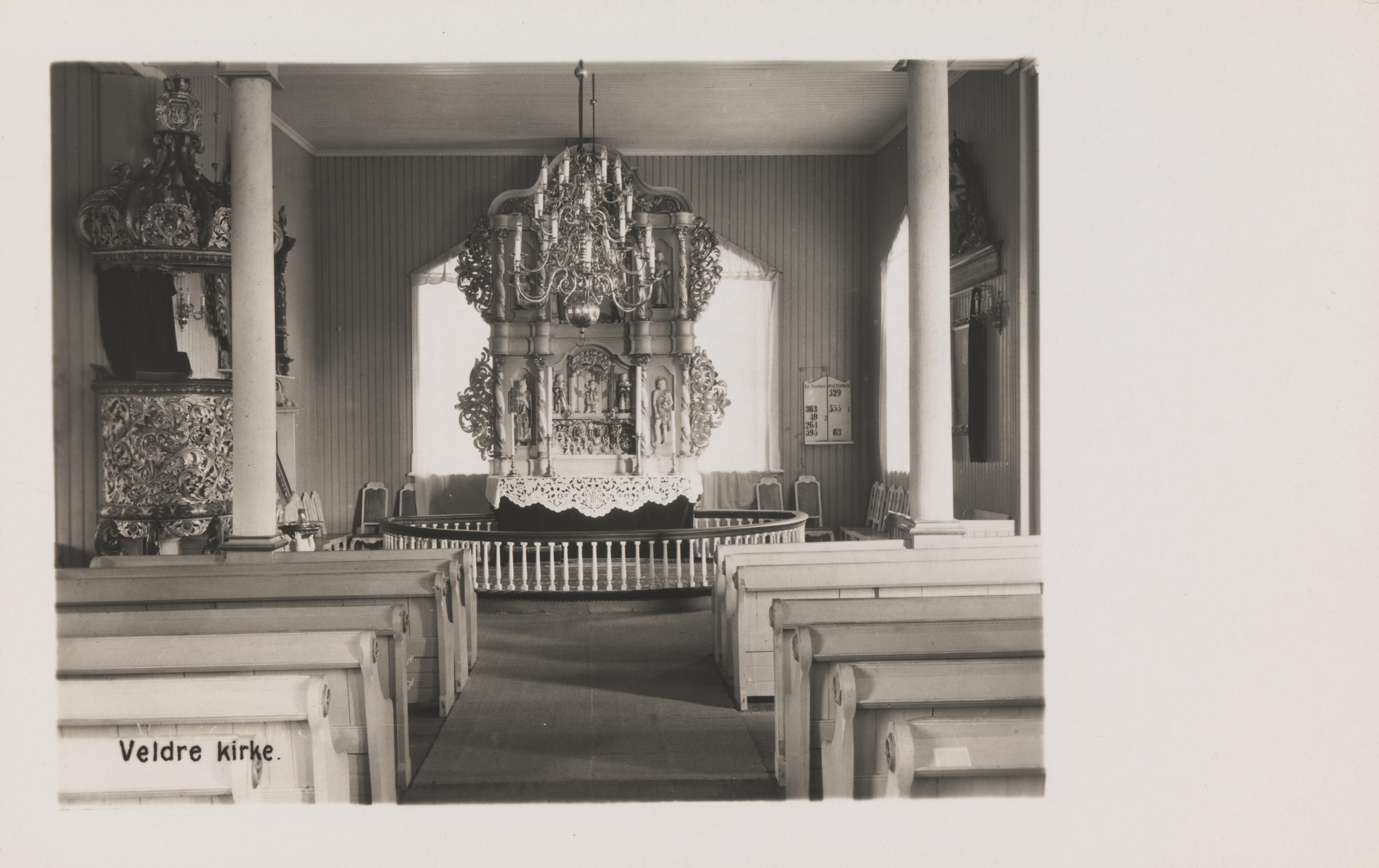
Interior of the old church (1726-1996)

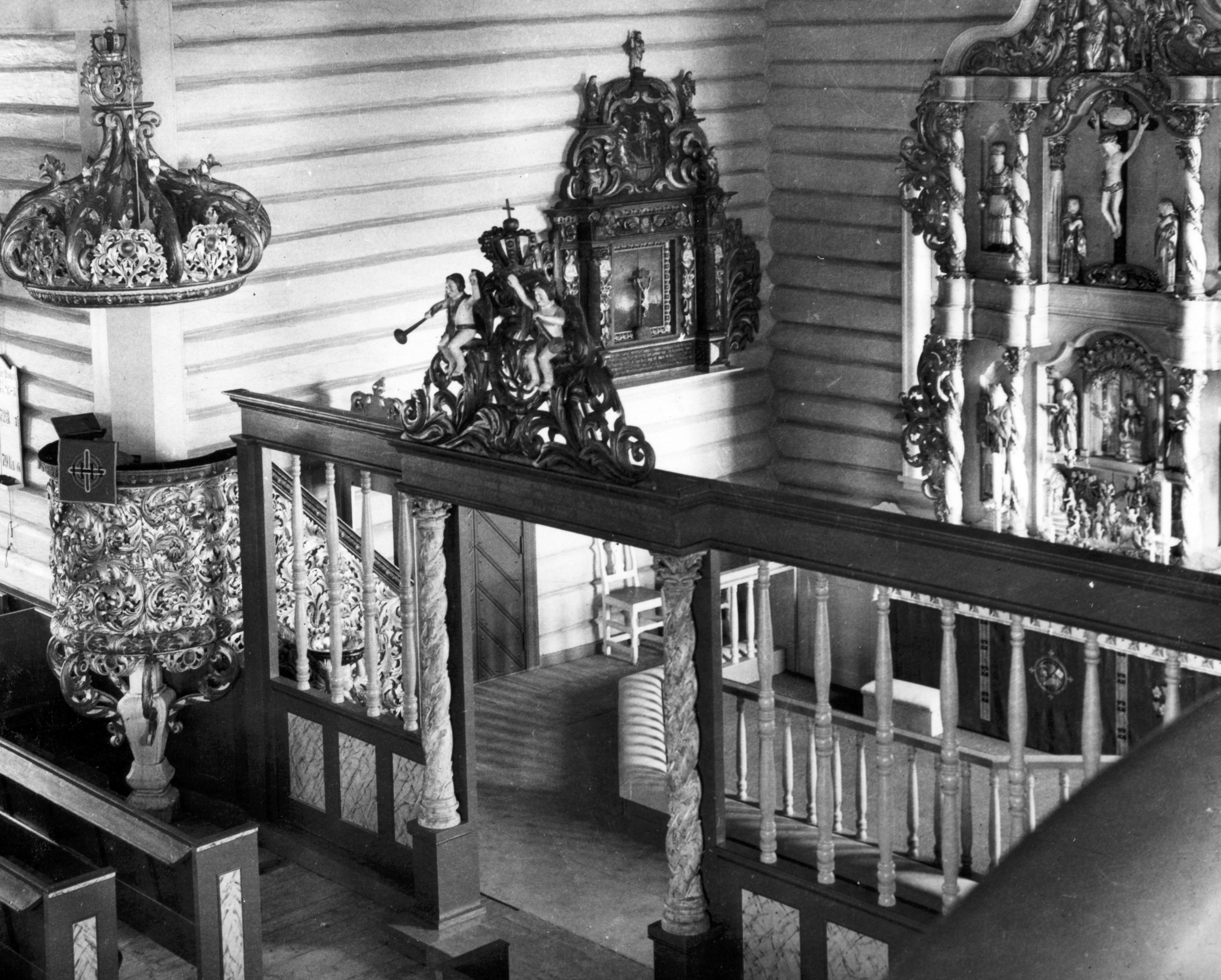
Interior of the old church (1726-1996)

== See also ==
- List of churches in Hamar
