= Ål Church (Gran) =

Church in Innlandet, Norway

- Ål kirke
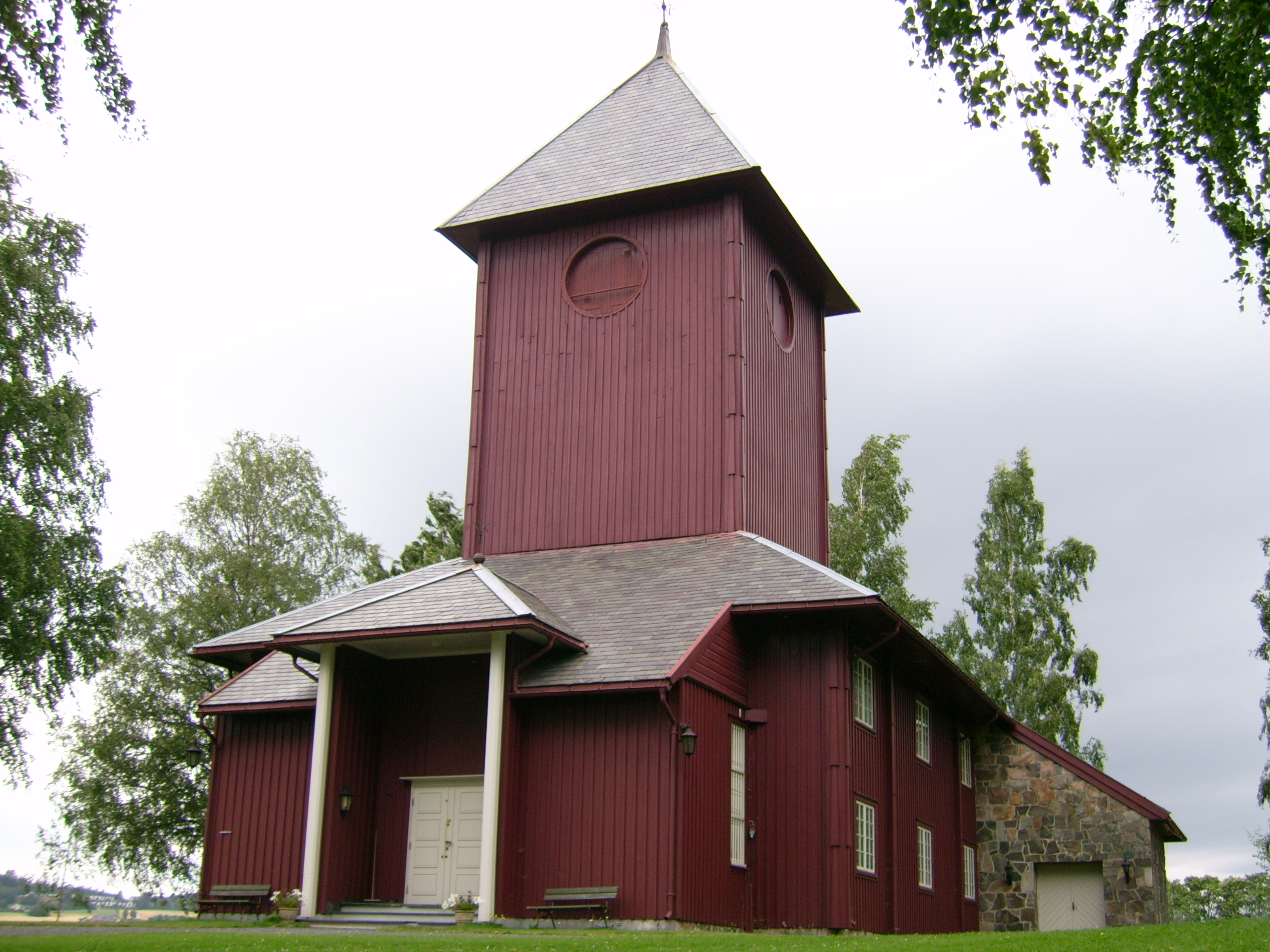
- View of the church
- Ål Church
- 60°21′30″N 10°35′08″E
- Location: Gran Municipality, Innlandet
- Country: Norway
- Denomination: Church of Norway
- Churchmanship: Evangelical Lutheran

History
- Status: Parish church
- Founded: 1930
- Consecrated: 2 March 1930

Architecture
- Functional status: Active
- Architect: Magnus Poulsson
- Architectural type: Long church
- Completed: 1930 (96 years ago)

Specifications
- Capacity: 270
- Materials: Wood

Administration
- Diocese: Hamar bispedømme
- Deanery: Hadeland og Land prosti
- Parish: Moen/Ål
- Norwegian Cultural Heritage Site
- Type: Church
- Status: Protected
- ID: 85955

Ål Church (Norwegian: Ål kirke) is a parish church of the Church of Norway in Gran Municipality in Innlandet county, Norway. It is located in the village of Gran. It is one of the churches for the Moen/Ål parish which is part of the Hadeland og Land prosti (deanery) in the Diocese of Hamar. The red, wooden church was built in a long church design in 1930 using plans drawn up by the architect Magnus Poulsson. The church seats about 270 people.

== History ==
Planning for a new church in the village of Gran took place throughout the 1920s. Magnus Poulsson was hired to design the new church. It was a wooden long church with seating for about 270 people. The church has a large wooden tower. The church was largely financed by donations and volunteer work. The new church was consecrated on 2 March 1930. Around 1970, a graveyard storage room was built as an extension to the side of the choir.

== Media gallery ==
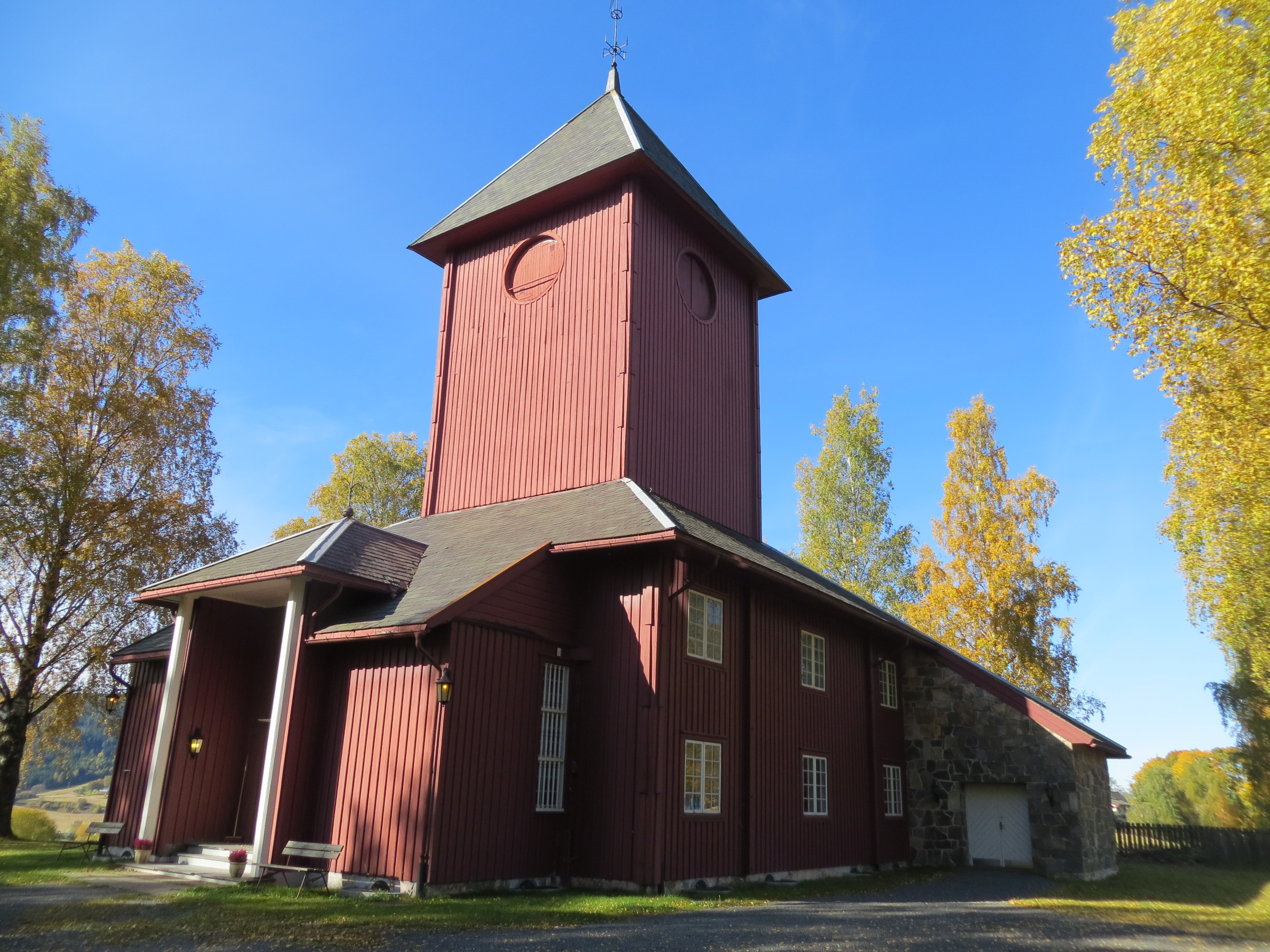

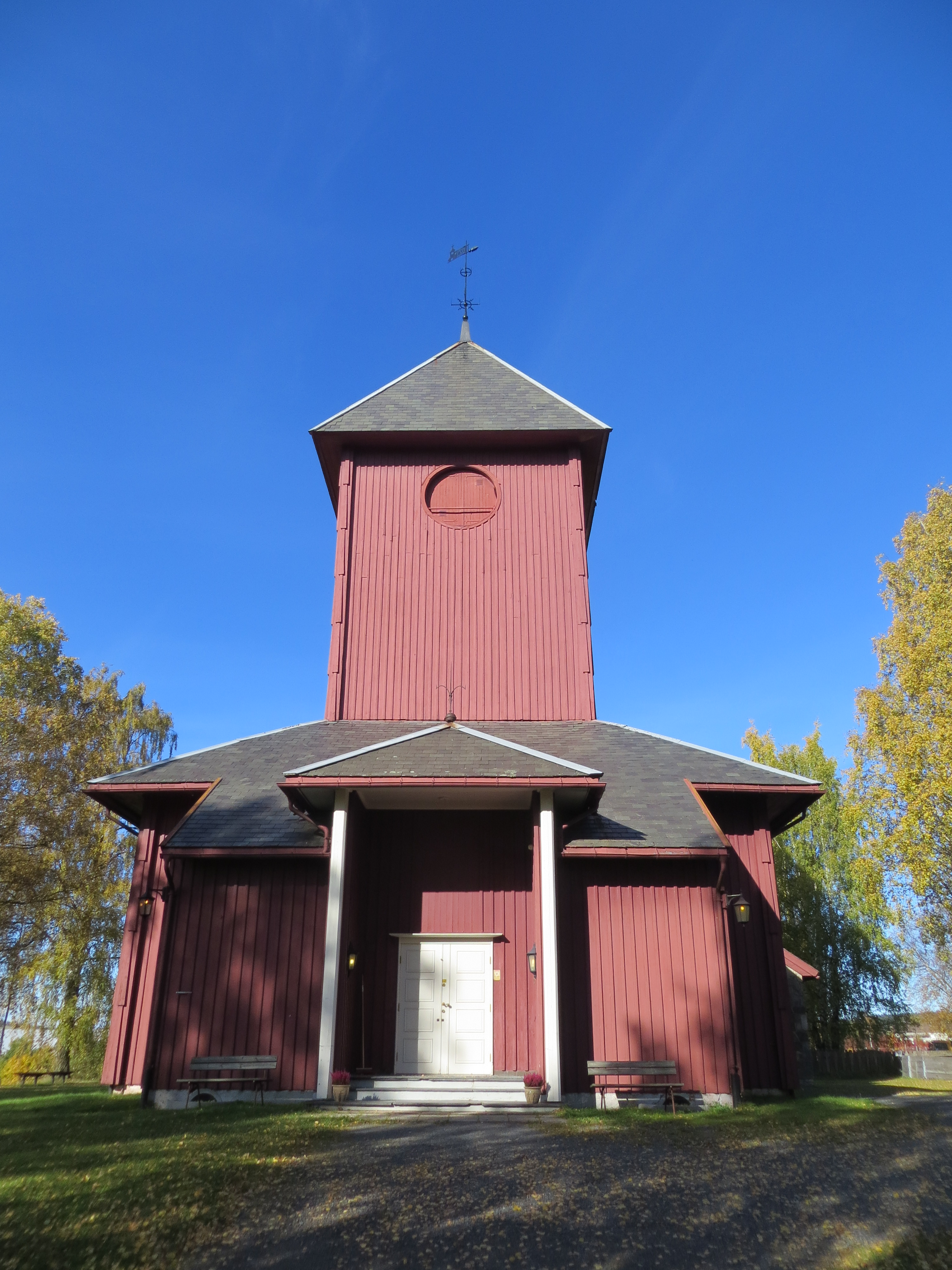

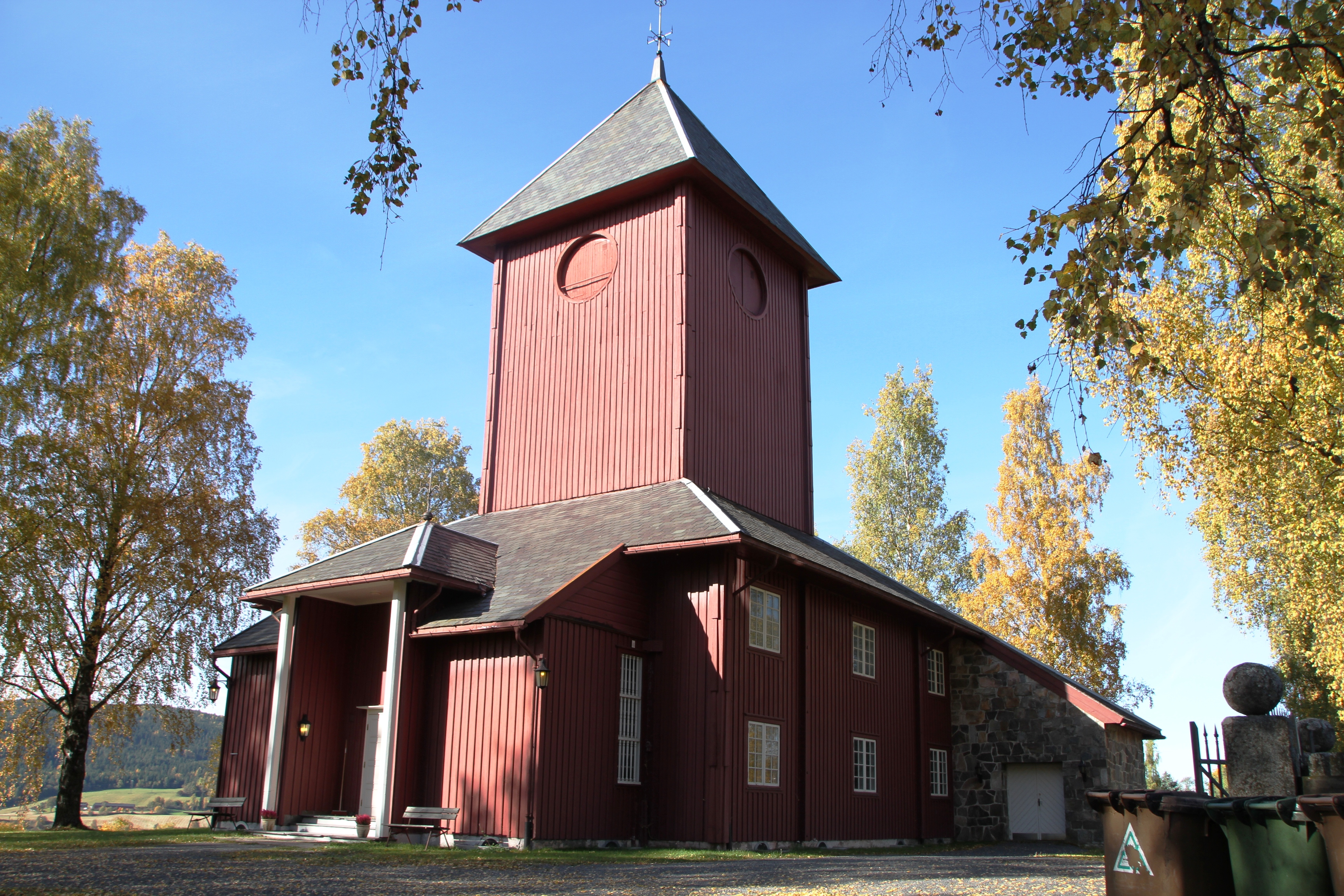

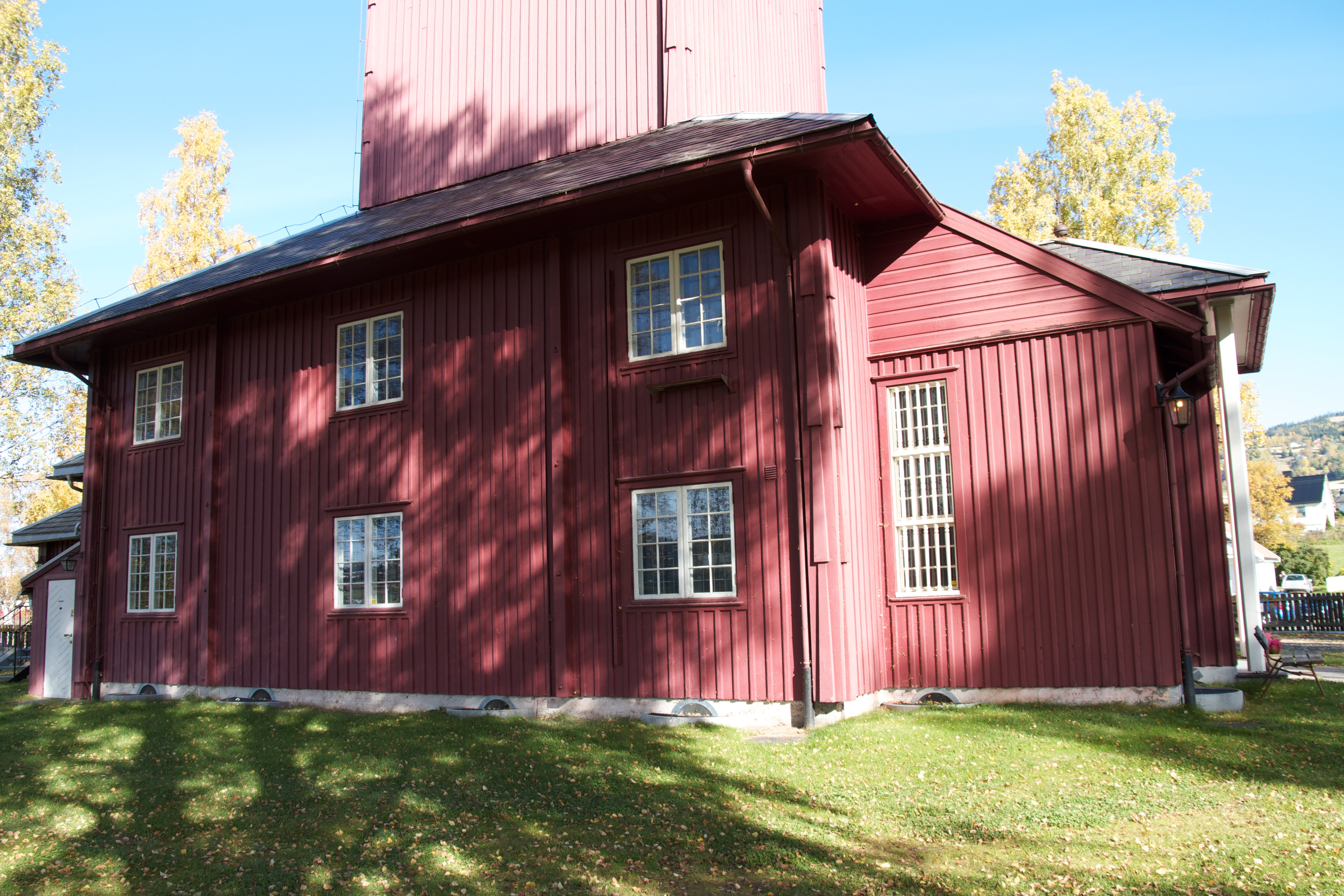

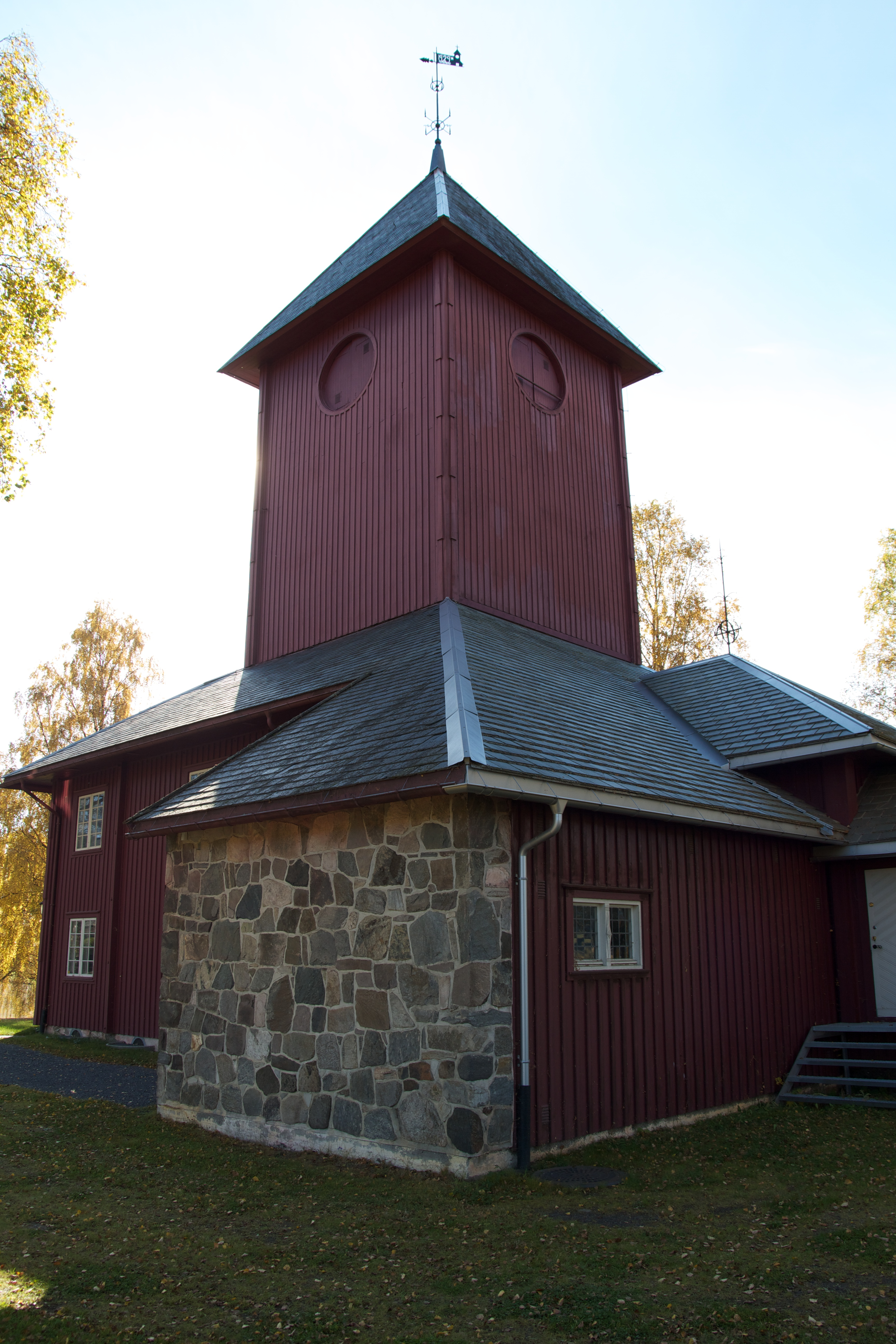

== See also ==
- List of churches in Hamar
