= Søre Ål Church =

Church in Innlandet, Norway

- Søre Ål kirke
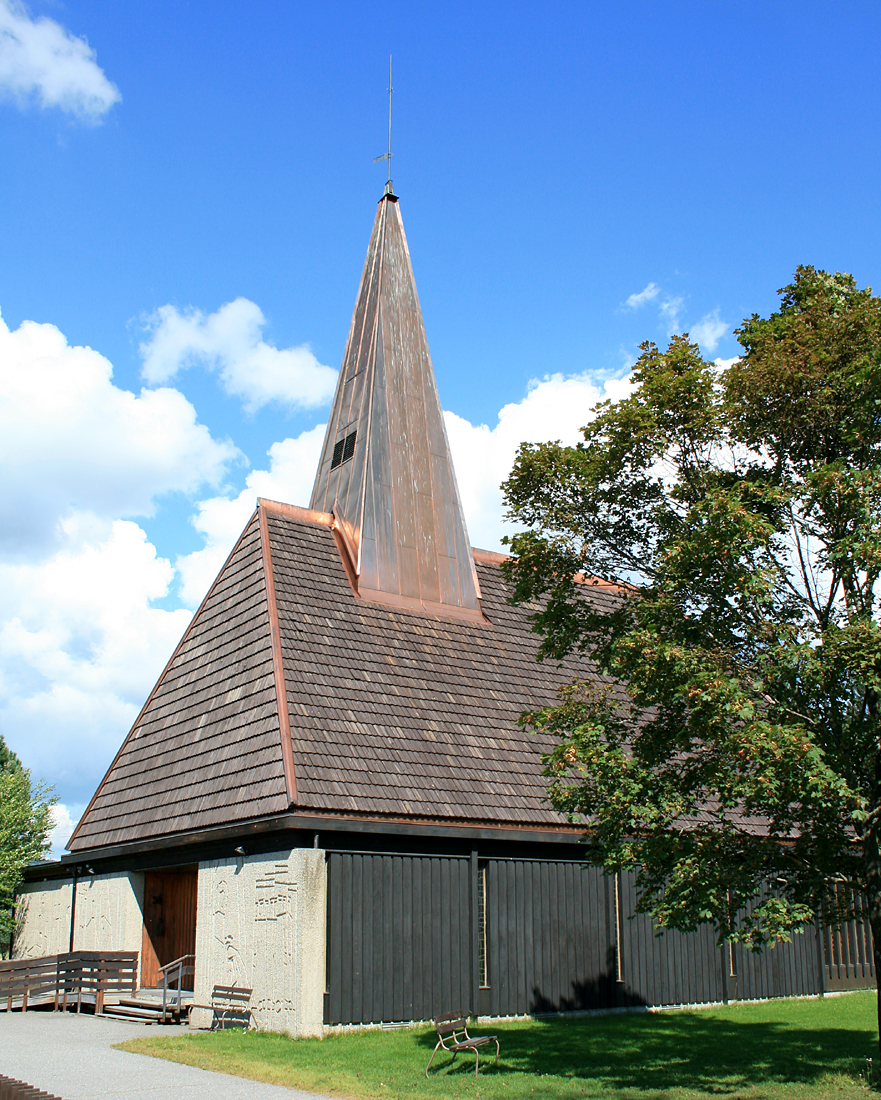
- View of the church
- Søre Ål Church
- 61°05′24″N 10°28′29″E
- Location: Lillehammer Municipality, Innlandet
- Country: Norway
- Denomination: Church of Norway
- Churchmanship: Evangelical Lutheran

History
- Status: Parish church
- Founded: 1964
- Consecrated: 1964

Architecture
- Functional status: Active
- Architect: Bjarne Bystad Ellefsen
- Architectural type: Rectangular
- Completed: 1964 (62 years ago)

Specifications
- Capacity: 200
- Materials: Concrete and wood

Administration
- Diocese: Hamar bispedømme
- Deanery: Sør-Gudbrandsdal prosti
- Parish: Søre Ål
- Norwegian Cultural Heritage Site
- Type: Church
- Status: Not protected
- ID: 85048

Søre Ål Church (Norwegian: Søre Ål kirke) is a parish church of the Church of Norway in Lillehammer Municipality in Innlandet county, Norway. It is located in the south part of the town of Lillehammer. It is the church for the Søre Ål parish which is part of the Sør-Gudbrandsdal prosti (deanery) in the Diocese of Hamar. The gray, concrete church was built in a rectangular design in 1964 using plans drawn up by the architect Bjarne Bystad Ellefsen. The church seats about 200 people.

== History ==
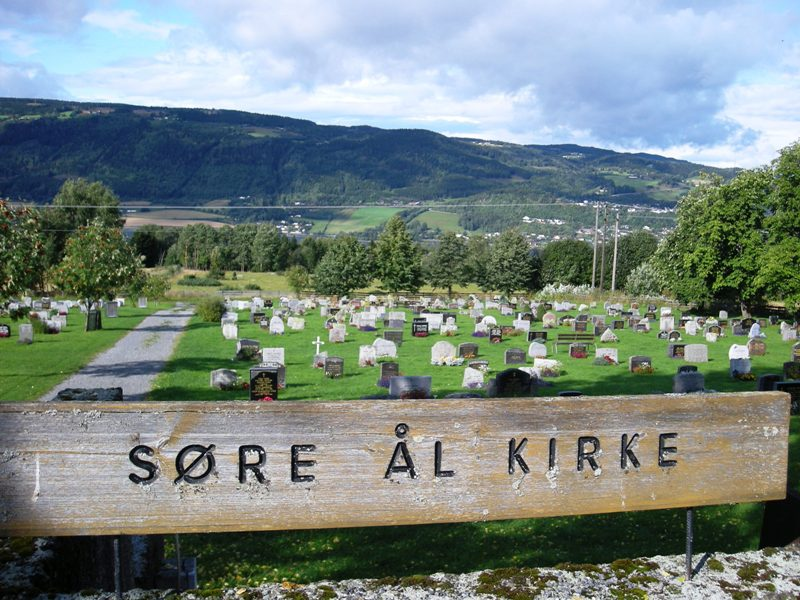
View of the graveyard at the church

In the mid-20th century, the parish decided to build a cemetery at Søre Ål. The new cemetery was consecrated in 1953. Soon after, the parish decided to build a church at the cemetery site. Bjarne Bystad Ellefsen was hired to design the new church. It was built out of concrete and wood and it was completed in 1964. The altarpiece by Victor Sparre shows a thorn-crowned Christ head with a cross in the background. There is also a glass frieze, showing the eyes of God, along the altar wall.

== Søre Ål parish ==
Gårdsnummer 59-98 were included in this parish. The attached KML file shows the church location and the farm locations in Gnr/Bnr format.

== See also ==
- List of churches in Hamar
