= Garmo =

Garmo, De Garmo or DeGarmo may refer to:

- Charles De Garmo (1849–1934), American educator, education theorist and college president
- Chris DeGarmo (born 1963), American guitarist and songwriter, known as a member of the metal band Queensrÿche
- Diana DeGarmo (born 1987), singer, songwriter and a Broadway and television actress
- Torgeir Garmo (born 1941), Norwegian politician for the Liberal Party
- Mary deGarmo Bryan (1891–1986), American dietitian, college professor
- Mount Garmo, mountain peak in Tajikistan
