= Nordre Ål Church =

Church in Innlandet, Norway

- Nordre Ål kirke
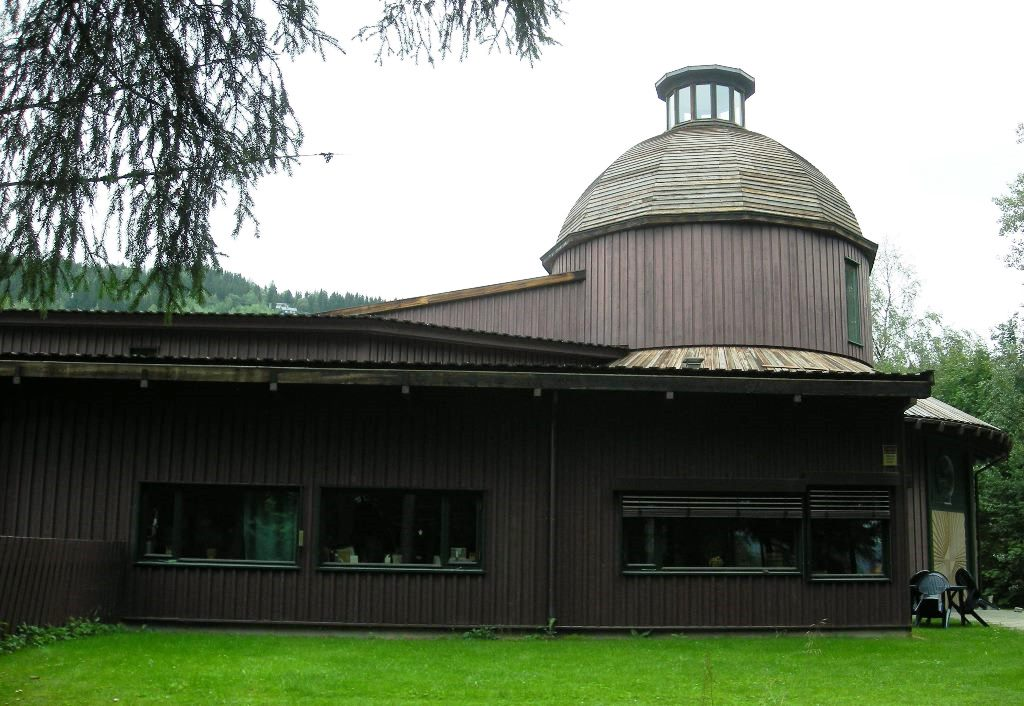
- View of the church
- Nordre Ål Church
- 61°08′07″N 10°28′09″E
- Location: Lillehammer Municipality, Innlandet
- Country: Norway
- Denomination: Church of Norway
- Previous denomination: Catholic Church
- Churchmanship: Evangelical Lutheran

History
- Status: Parish church
- Founded: 1994
- Consecrated: 2 October 1994

Architecture
- Functional status: Active
- Architect: Willy Sveen
- Architectural type: Fan-shaped
- Completed: 1994 (32 years ago)

Specifications
- Capacity: 550
- Materials: Wood

Administration
- Diocese: Hamar bispedømme
- Deanery: Sør-Gudbrandsdal prosti
- Parish: Nordre Ål

Nordre Ål Church (Norwegian: Nordre Ål kirke) is a parish church of the Church of Norway in Lillehammer Municipality in Innlandet county, Norway. It is located in the town of Lillehammer. It is the church for the Nordre Ål parish which is part of the Sør-Gudbrandsdal prosti (deanery) in the Diocese of Hamar. The brown, concrete and wood church was built in a fan-shaped design in 1994 using plans drawn up by the architect Willy Sveen. The church seats about 550 people.

== History ==
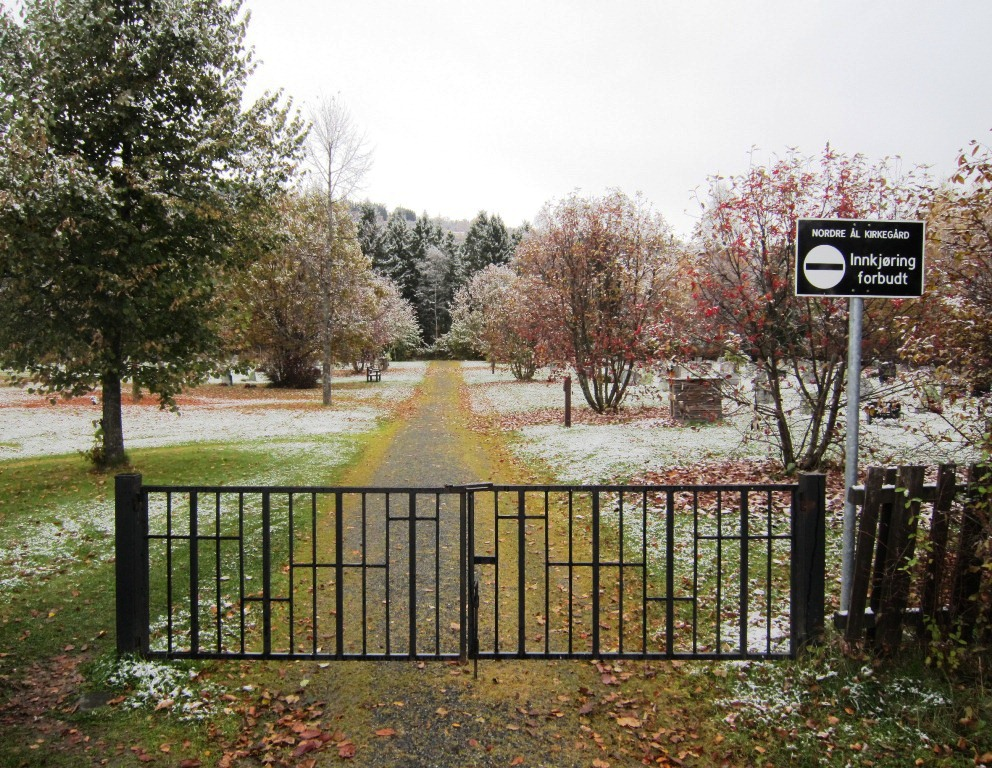
View of the graveyard

The people living in the northern part of the town of Lillehammer began pushing for a church of their own as early as the 1930s. During the 1970s, a committee was formed to build a church and land was purchased in 1973. However, no municipal funds were allotted for the church, so the land was used for other purposes. Again in 1984, another committee was formed for building a new church. The cemetery's location was purchased and approved in 1985, and an architectural group was appointed in 1987. Willy Sveen was the project manager, and he is usually credited as the architect for the building. Plans for the new church were presented in 1987 and approved in 1988. After some postponements, the church was included in the plans for the 1994 Olympic games in Lillehammer. The Olympic village where participants were going to live was near the Nordre Ål cemetery. The church, which was originally intended to be located southwest of the cemetery, was built northeast of it, and during the Olympics, the building was used as a bar, disco, and cinema before it was consecrated as a church. The actual consecration of the church took place on 2 October 1994.

== Nordre Ål parish ==
Gårdsnummer 37-58 were included in this parish. The attached KML file shows the church location and the farm locations in Gnr/Bnr format.

== See also ==
- List of churches in Hamar
