= Bruflat Church =

Church in Innlandet, Norway

- Bruflat kyrkje
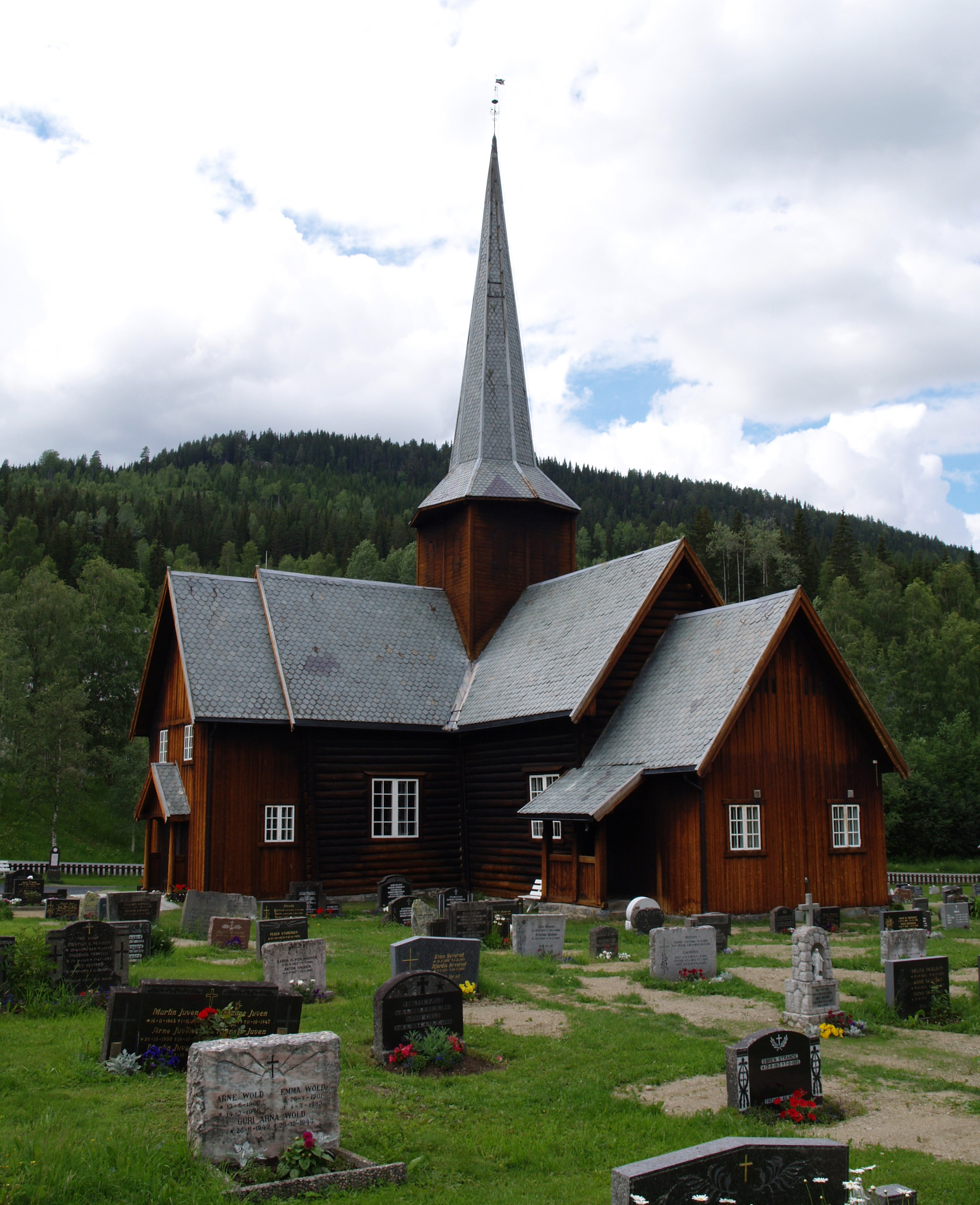
- View of the church
- Bruflat Church
- 60°53′16″N 9°38′21″E
- Location: Etnedal Municipality, Innlandet
- Country: Norway
- Denomination: Church of Norway
- Previous denomination: Catholic Church
- Churchmanship: Evangelical Lutheran

History
- Status: Parish church
- Founded: 13th century
- Consecrated: 24 July 1750

Architecture
- Functional status: Active
- Architect: Svend Tråseth
- Architectural type: Cruciform
- Completed: 1750 (276 years ago)
- Closed: c. 1350-1641

Specifications
- Capacity: 217
- Materials: Wood

Administration
- Diocese: Hamar bispedømme
- Deanery: Valdres prosti
- Parish: Bruflat
- Norwegian Cultural Heritage Site
- Type: Church
- Status: Automatically protected
- ID: 83958

Bruflat Church (Norwegian: Bruflat kyrkje) is a parish church of the Church of Norway in Etnedal Municipality in Innlandet county, Norway. It is located in the village of Bruflat. It is the church for the Bruflat parish which is part of the Valdres prosti (deanery) in the Diocese of Hamar. The brown, wooden church was built in a cruciform design in 1750 using plans drawn up by the architect Svend Tråseth. The church seats about 217 people.

== History ==
The earliest existing historical records of the church date back to the year 1317, but the church was not built that year. The first church in Bruflat was a wooden stave church that was built during the 13th century. This church was located about 350 metres (1,150 ft) northwest of the present church. What then happened to this church is not entirely clear, but it seems as if the whole area of Etnedal was almost depopulated and overgrown after the Black Death in 1350. After this time, the church was not used for a long time.

After the Reformation, the local people of Etnedal requested permission to build a local church. In 1641, a new church was built at Bruflat, at approximately the same location as the medieval church site. The church was consecrated on 25 June 1641. There is no reliable description of this new chapel, but it is believed that it was a simple, small, wooden annex chapel that was subordinate to the main Aurdal Church. About 100 years later, the parish determined that a new church was needed. The new church was built a little further down the hill from the old church. There has been great confusion as to date of construction of the new church, but samples of wood indicate that timber was felled from the winter of 1736–1737 to the winter of 1743–1744, so the church was likely built during the mid- to late-1740s. The church was officially consecrated on 24 July 1750. The church was built by Svend Tråseth.

The church has been rebuilt, repaired, and restored a number of times, including in 1818–1820, 1860, 1909–1912, and 1974–75. The work that was done in 1909–1912 was particularly extensive, which took place on the basis of drawings by Holger Sinding-Larsen. On that occasion, the cross-arms in the west, south, and east were extended. The extension on the east end became a new sacristy. In April 1940, Bruflat Church was left in the line of fire during World War II, and the church records were all moved to a nearby house for safe keeping, but the house burned down, so the historic church records were lost.

== See also ==
- List of churches in Hamar
