= Svend Tråseth =

Norwegian architect and builder

Svend Olsen Tråseth Sven Olsen Traaset
- Born: 1699; Fåberg, Norway
- Died: 1769 (aged 69–70); Søndre Aurdalen, Norway
- Occupation: Architect

Svend Tråseth (1699—1769) was a Norwegian architect and builder in the Gudbrandsdalen and Valdres areas of Eastern Norway. At that time in Norway, spellings had not been standardized, so his last name is often spelled differently including Traaseth, Trådset, and Trosset.

It is probable that he was responsible for the construction of Fåberg Church in the 1720s and Lillehammer Church in 1733. In 1735-1736 he was builder for Bagn Church in Søndre Aurdal and in 1735-1737 for Aurdal Church in Nordre Aurdal. He built the tower for the Elverum Church in 1737 and a new tower for the Hedalen Stave Church in 1738. In 1749-1750 he built Bruflat Church in Etnedal. All his churches were half-timbered cruciform churches.

He also worked as an innkeeper in Bagn in Valdres. He was married to Elie Henriksdatter.
