= Nord-Etnedal Church =

Church in Innlandet, Norway

- Nord-Etnedal kyrkje
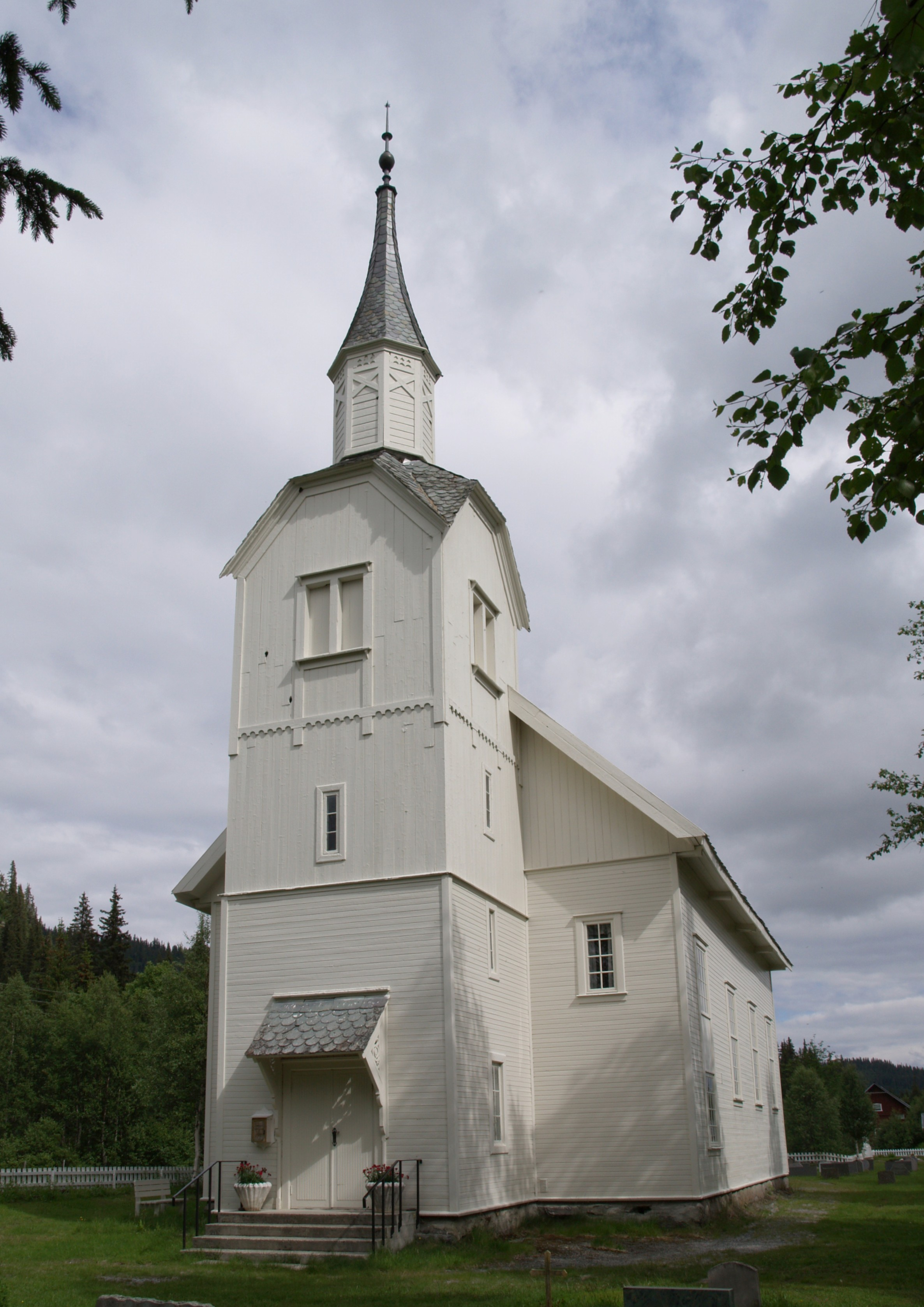
- View of the church
- Nord-Etnedal Church
- 61°01′31″N 9°30′02″E
- Location: Etnedal Municipality, Innlandet
- Country: Norway
- Denomination: Church of Norway
- Churchmanship: Evangelical Lutheran

History
- Status: Parish church
- Founded: 1866
- Consecrated: 19 September 1866

Architecture
- Functional status: Active
- Architect: Jacob Wilhelm Nordan
- Architectural type: Long church
- Completed: 1866 (160 years ago)

Specifications
- Capacity: 146
- Materials: Wood

Administration
- Diocese: Hamar bispedømme
- Deanery: Valdres prosti
- Parish: Nord-Etnedal
- Norwegian Cultural Heritage Site
- Type: Church
- Status: Not protected
- ID: 85150

Nord-Etnedal Church (Norwegian: Nord-Etnedal kyrkje) is a parish church of the Church of Norway in Etnedal Municipality in Innlandet county, Norway. It is located in the village of Brøtahaugen. It is the church for the Nord-Etnedal parish which is part of the Valdres prosti (deanery) in the Diocese of Hamar. The white, wooden church was built in a long church design in 1866 using plans drawn up by the architect Jacob Wilhelm Nordan. The church seats about 146 people.

== History ==
The municipal council of Nord-Aurdal Municipality approved the construction of a new church in 1862 to serve the people in the northern part of the Etnedal valley (this was before Etnedal Municipality was established in 1894). This new church was approved by the government in 1864. There was some controversy about location, but this was solved when Ole Erikson Ton on the Nedre Ton farm donated land for a church and burial ground. The architectural drawings the new Nord-Etnedal Church were designed by John Stenersen, who had recently designed the nearby Strand Church when the old church was moved. The church ministry did not approve these, however, so Jacob Wilhelm Nordan designed the new building. The church was built by builder Johan Eriksen from Fåberg. The new building was consecrated on 19 September 1866. In 1957, plans were made to rebuild the church using plans by the architect Magnus Wold. The plans included adding rooms for use for baptisms and confirmations under the west gallery; new doors and windows; and a new, vaulted ceiling. The work was completed from 1960 to 1963.

== See also ==
- List of churches in Hamar
