= Spåtind =

Mountain in Innlandet, Norway

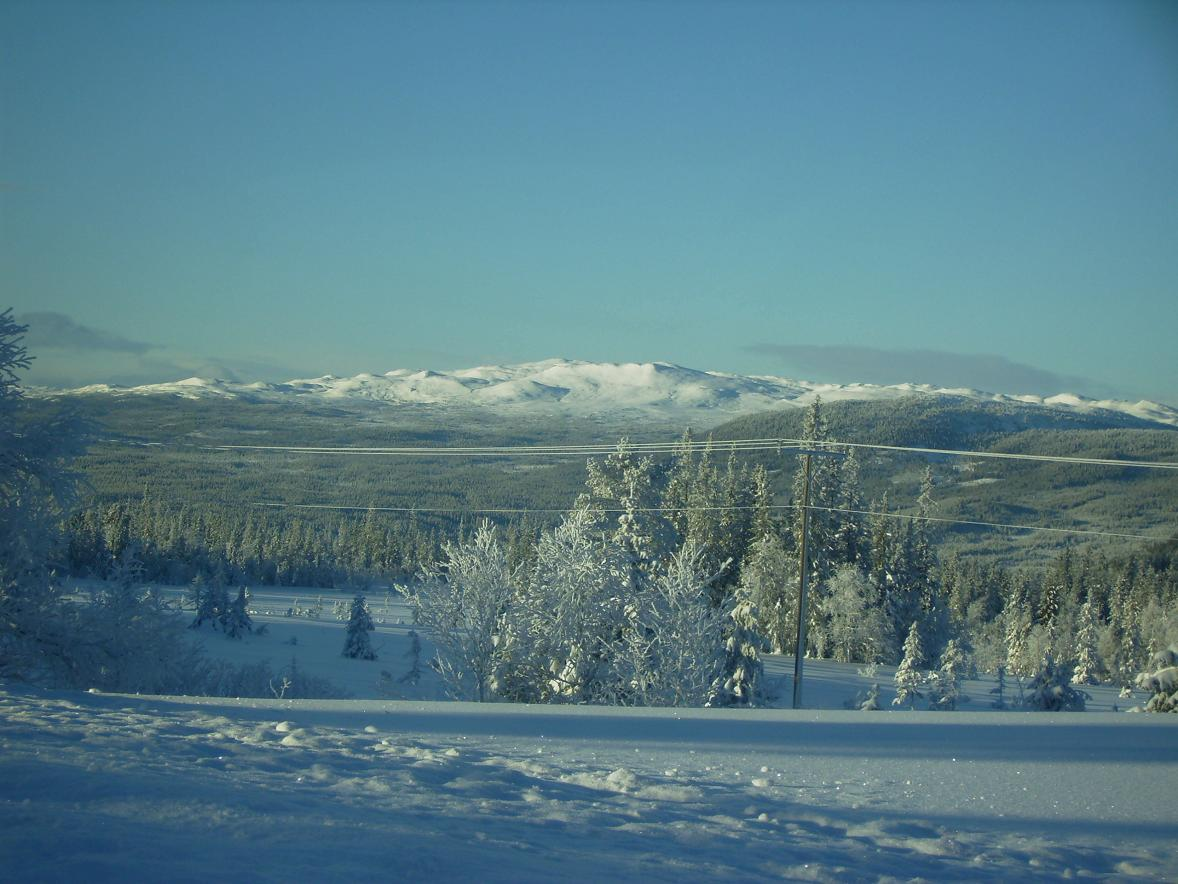

Highest point
- Elevation: 1,414 m (4,639 ft)
- Prominence: 474 m (1,555 ft)
- Isolation: 33 km (21 mi) to Nordre Langsua
- Coordinates: 61°04′37″N 9°47′22″E

Geography
- Interactive map of the mountain
- Location: Innlandet, Norway
- Topo map: 1717 II Synnfjell

Spåtind is a mountain in Innlandet county, Norway. The 1,414-metre (4,639 ft) tall mountain is located on the border of Etnedal Municipality and Nordre Land Municipality about 36 kilometres (22 mi) west of the town of Lillehammer and about 30 kilometres (19 mi) northeast of the town of Fagernes. The mountain lies a few kilometers south of the border of Langsua National Park.

Spåtind is the highest mountain in the mountain area known as Synnfjell. There are numerous cabins situated around the mountain, the largest cluster being Hugulia on the southern side. On the western side there is a facility for alpine skiing and a hotel.

== Name ==
The first element is the verb spå which means "predict" or "see into the future", but here it was used in the old sense which used to mean "to scout" (related to the German word spähen, the Latin word specio, and the English word spy). The last element is tind which means "mountain peak". The peak is visible from long distances over a large region.

== See also ==
- List of mountains of Norway by height
