= Reinli Stave Church =

Church in Innlandet, Norway

- Reinli stavkyrkje
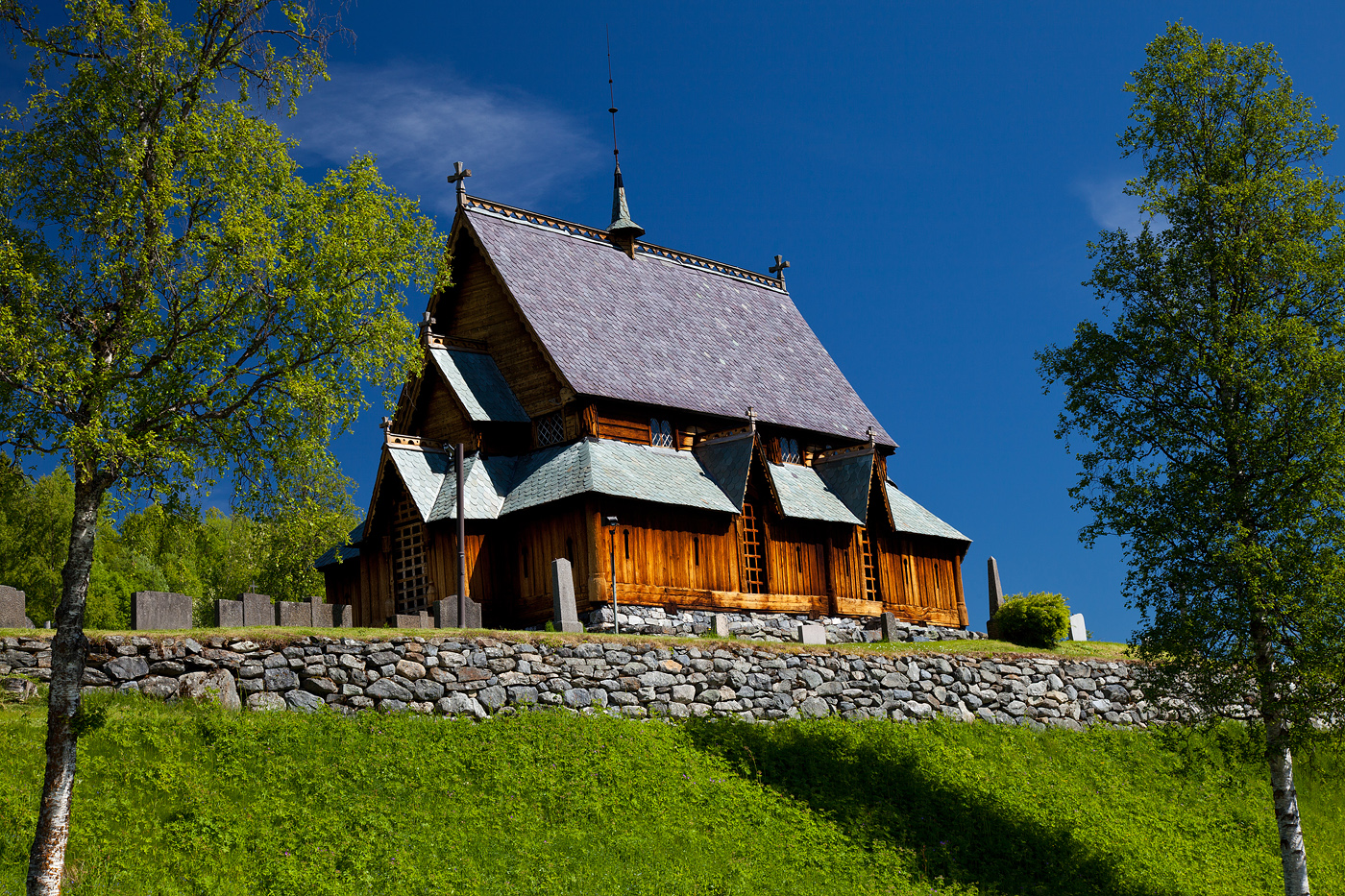
- View of the church
- Reinli Stave Church
- 60°49′53″N 9°29′35″E
- Location: Sør-Aurdal, Innlandet
- Country: Norway
- Denomination: Church of Norway
- Previous denomination: Catholic Church
- Churchmanship: Evangelical Lutheran

History
- Status: Preserved parish church
- Founded: c. 1300
- Consecrated: c. 1300

Architecture
- Functional status: Inactive
- Architectural type: Long church
- Completed: c. 1300 (726 years ago)

Specifications
- Capacity: 70
- Materials: Wood

Administration
- Diocese: Hamar bispedømme
- Deanery: Valdres prosti
- Parish: Reinli
- Norwegian Cultural Heritage Site
- Type: Church
- Status: Automatically protected
- ID: 85281

Reinli Stave Church (Norwegian: Reinli stavkyrkje) is a preserved parish church of the Church of Norway in Sør-Aurdal Municipality in Innlandet county, Norway. It is located in the village of Reinli. It is the former church for the Reinli parish which is part of the Valdres prosti (deanery) in the Diocese of Hamar. The brown, wooden church was built in a long church design around the year 1300 using plans drawn up by an unknown architect. The church seats about 70 people.

== History ==
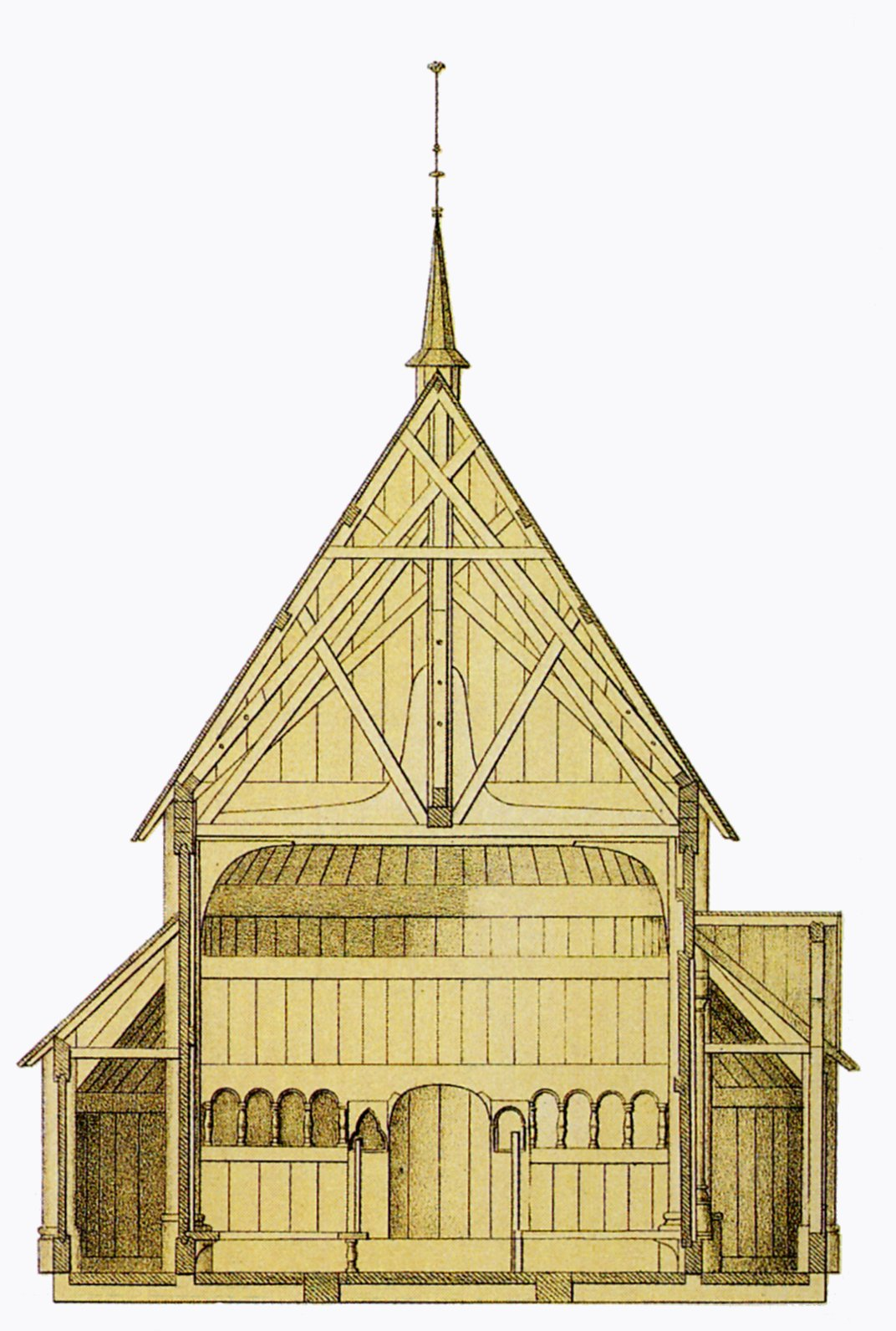
Drawing of Reinli Stave Church by Georg Andreas Bull ca. 1855

The first references made to a church at Reinli comes from King Olaf Haraldsson who traveled through Valdres in the year 1023 and also visited Reinli. It is believed that there was a pagan temple at the same location before the first church was erected. The first church was possibly a wooden post church that was built during the early 11th century. Modern archaeologists have found evidence that this church burned down before the present church was constructed.

After the previous church burned down, a new wooden stave church was built on the same site. The exact age of this church is uncertain. Through radiocarbon dating, logs in the church have been dated to 1190, which somewhat contradicts previous datings of the church. Other beams in the nave date to the years 1225 and 1272. There are some claims that the church was built after 1326, but this seems to be outside the margin of error for the radiocarbon dating. Most historians say the church was built in the late 13th century. There is, however, a written account of the present church's existence in 1327, so it was certainly built by then. It is also possible that after the fire, the old church was heavily rebuilt with some materials being reused.

The Reinli stave church follows a plan set by continental churches in monasteries. The choir also has an apse, which is believed to be a little newer than the rest of the building, although some details in the building's history seem unclear. The church (other than the apse) measures approximately 11.5 by 5.6 metres (38 ft × 18 ft). There is an open-air corridor that surrounds the whole church. Later the church was rebuilt by Sira Thord, who is buried beneath the south-east entrance. The church is generally assumed to be close to its original configuration, although some sources dispute this.

In 1734, it was decided to demolish the stave church and build a new church on Bagnsmoen for Reinli and Bagn (where the local stave church disappeared a few decades earlier). After protests from Reinli, however, the Reinli stave church remained standing, and a new Bagn Church was built at Bagn, and that church became the main church for the parish.

The church underwent interior changes in 1884–1885. By the mid-20th century, discussions again took place about the future of the old stave church. It did not have electricity for heating or lighting, and it was quite old and small. It was decided to build a new church and maintain the old church as a museum. In 1965, a new Reinli Chapel was built across the road from the ancient stave church. The new chapel replaced the stave church as the parish church for Reinli. Since then, the stave church is only used for special occasions in the summers. Restoration work was done on the exterior in 1976–1977.

Of medieval fixtures, only the altarpiece and the baptismal font are left in the church. An old pillory stands outside the church, but is no longer in use. On 17 May 1845 its use was formally abandoned when the old medieval law was changed.

== Media gallery ==
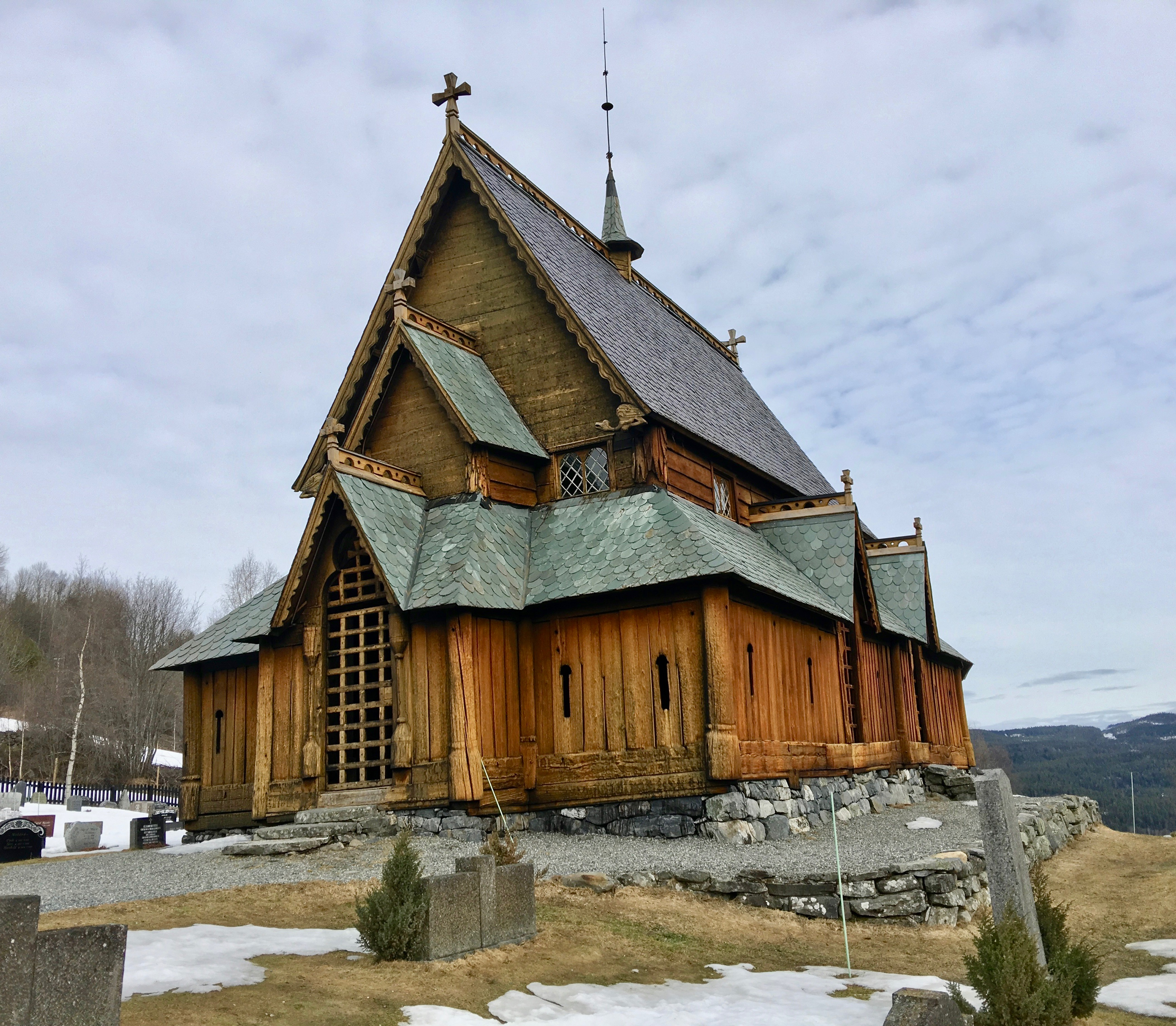

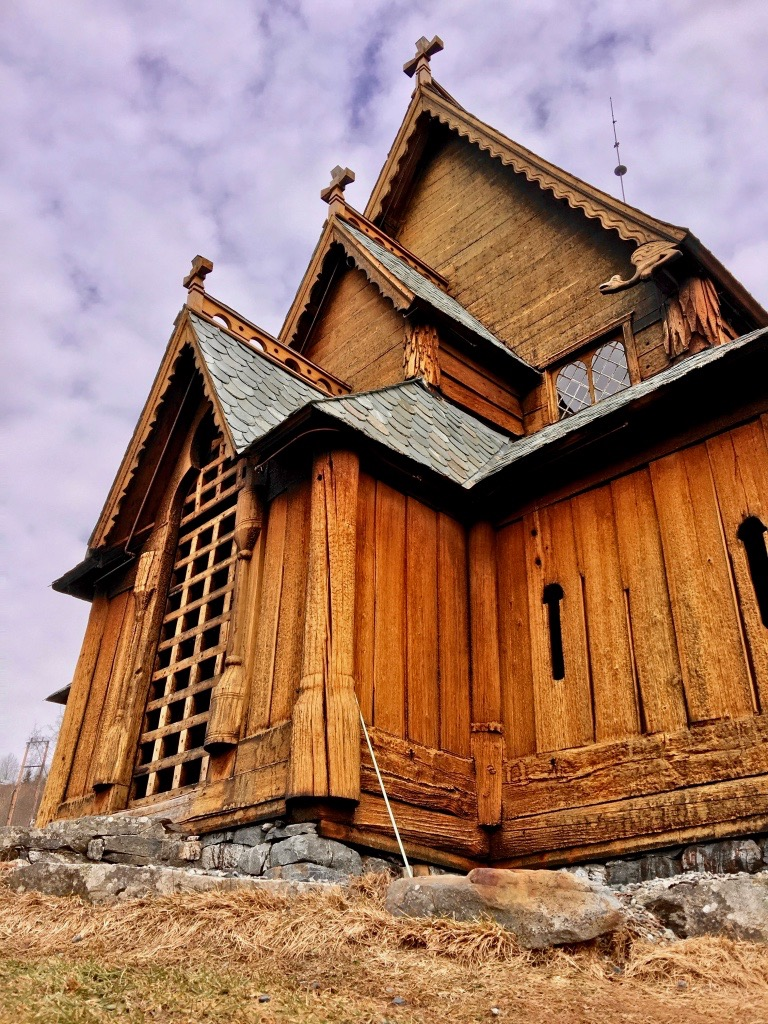

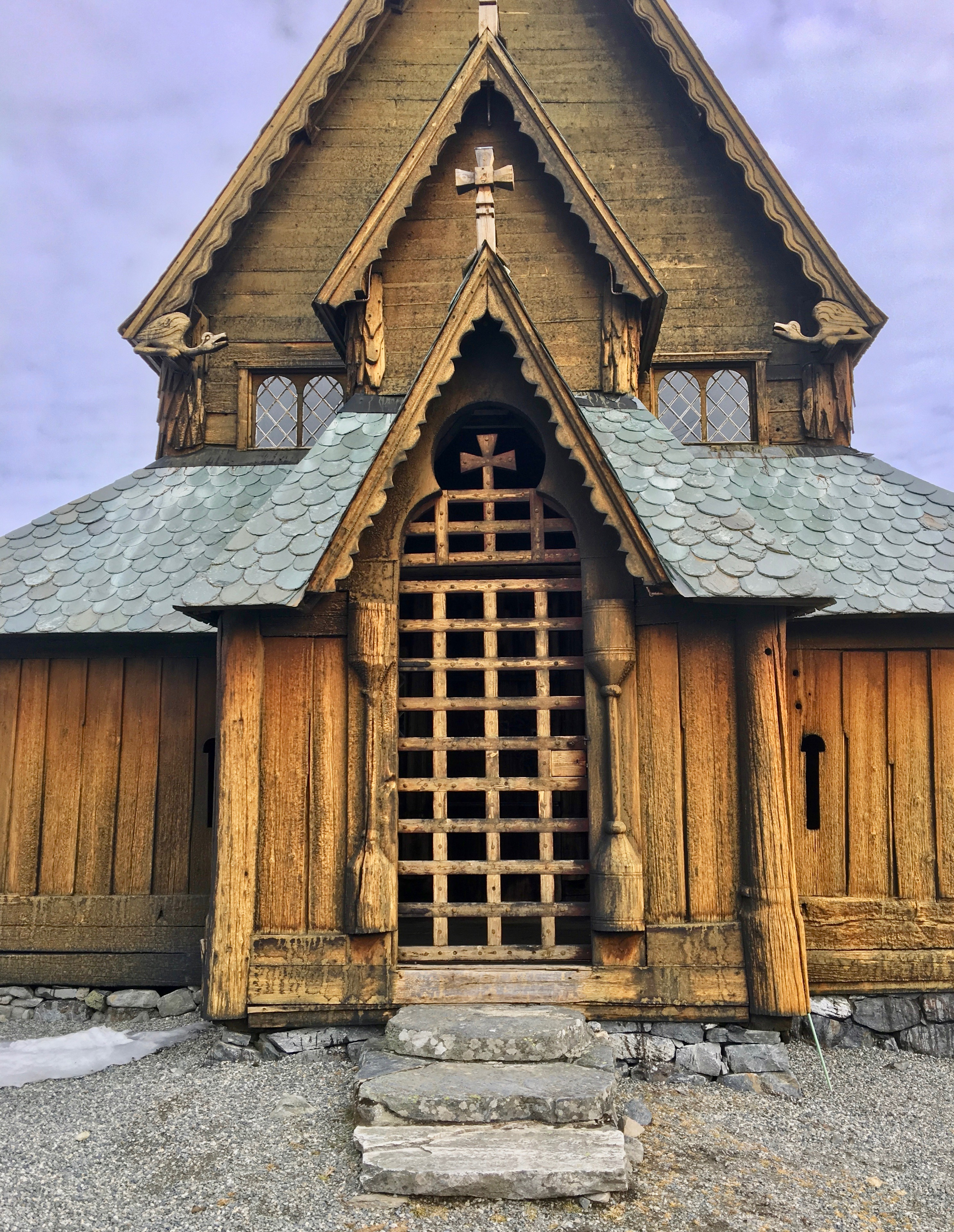

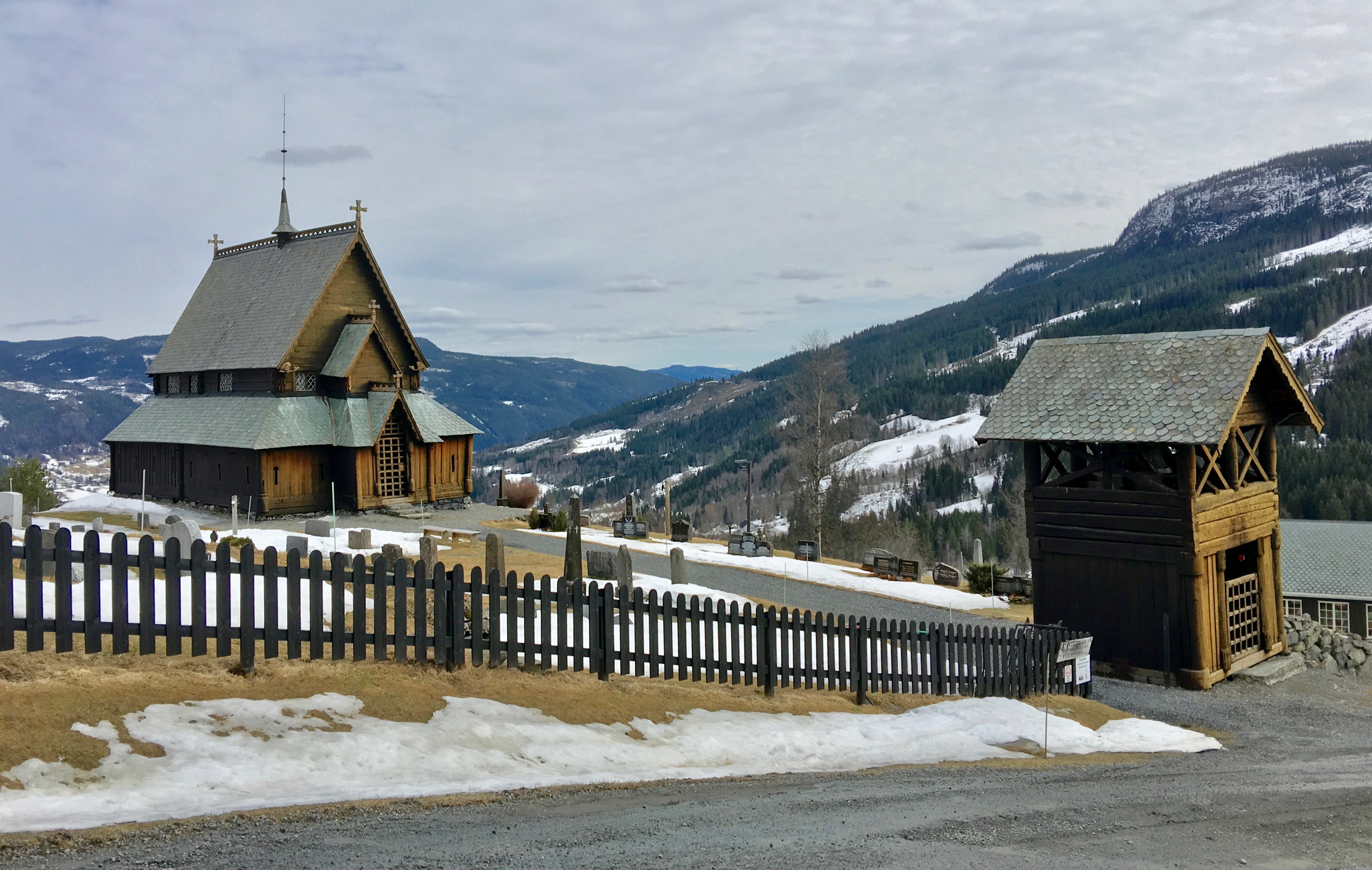

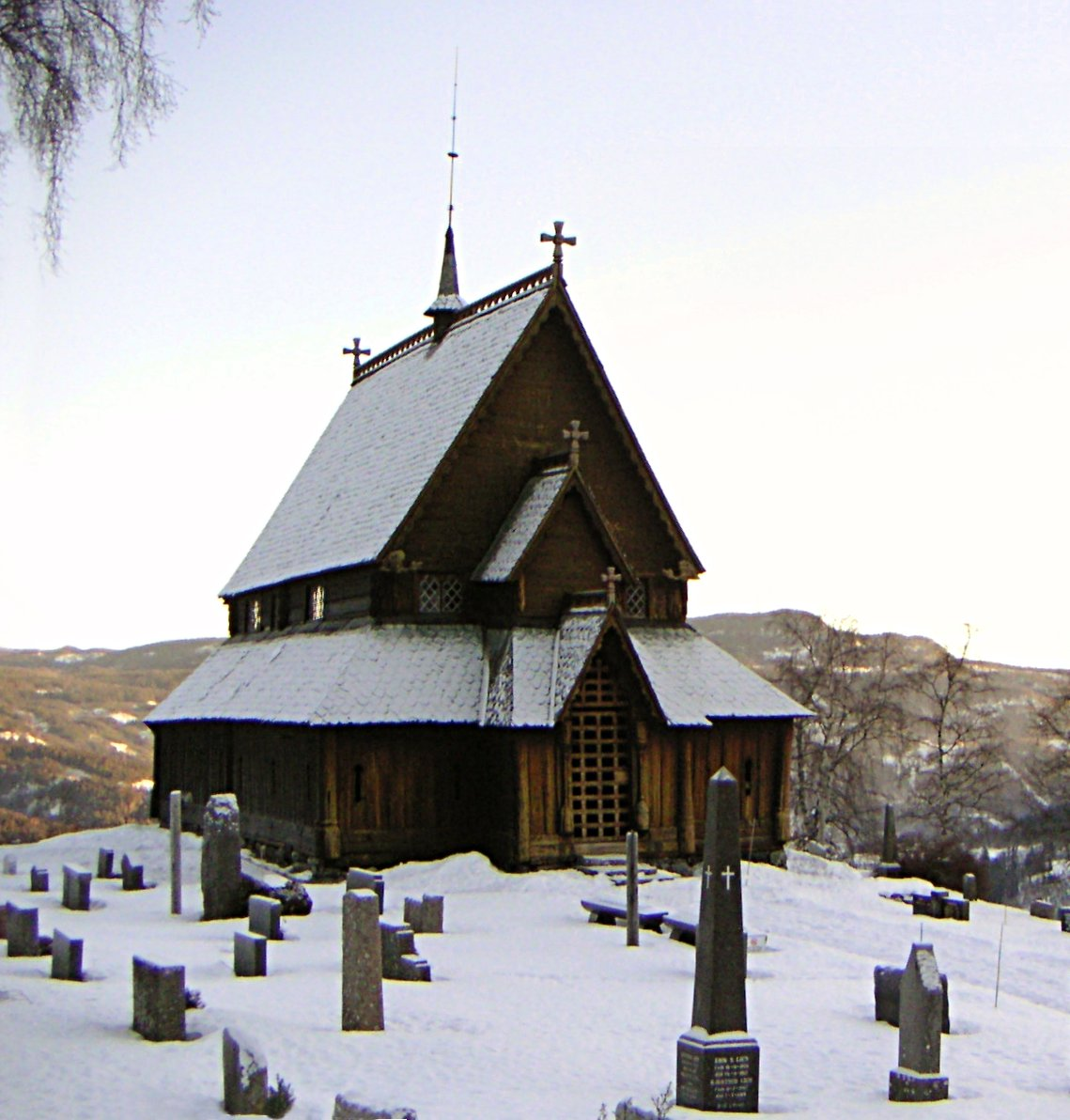

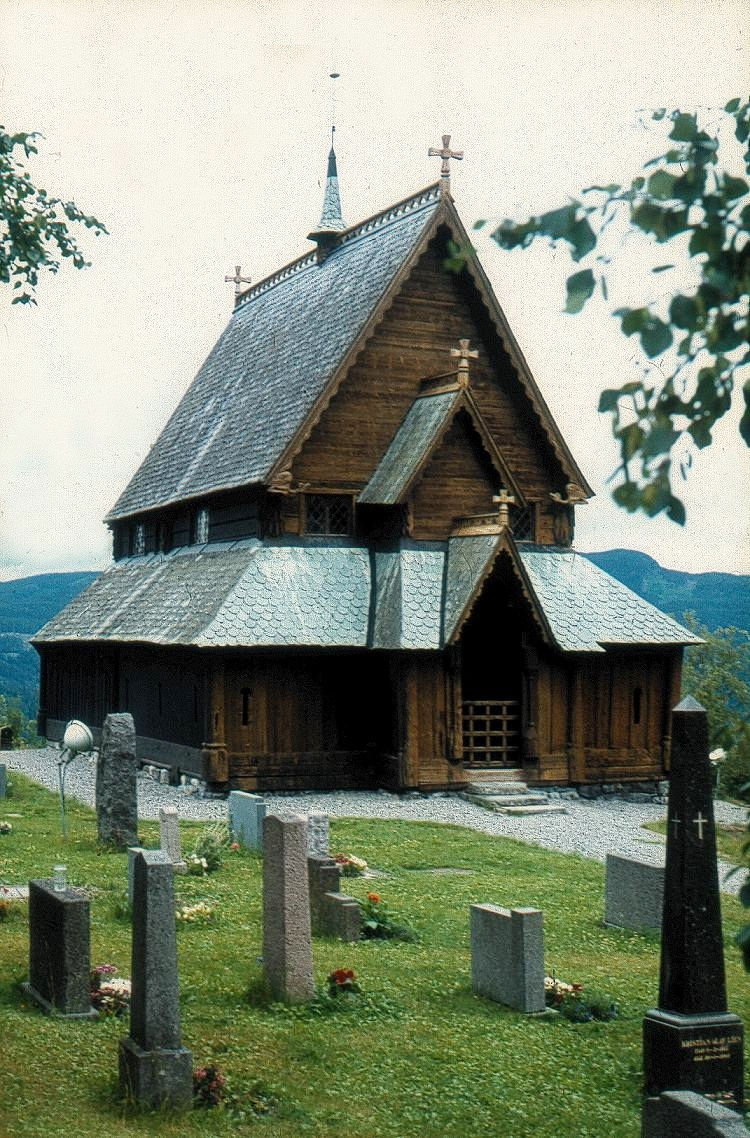

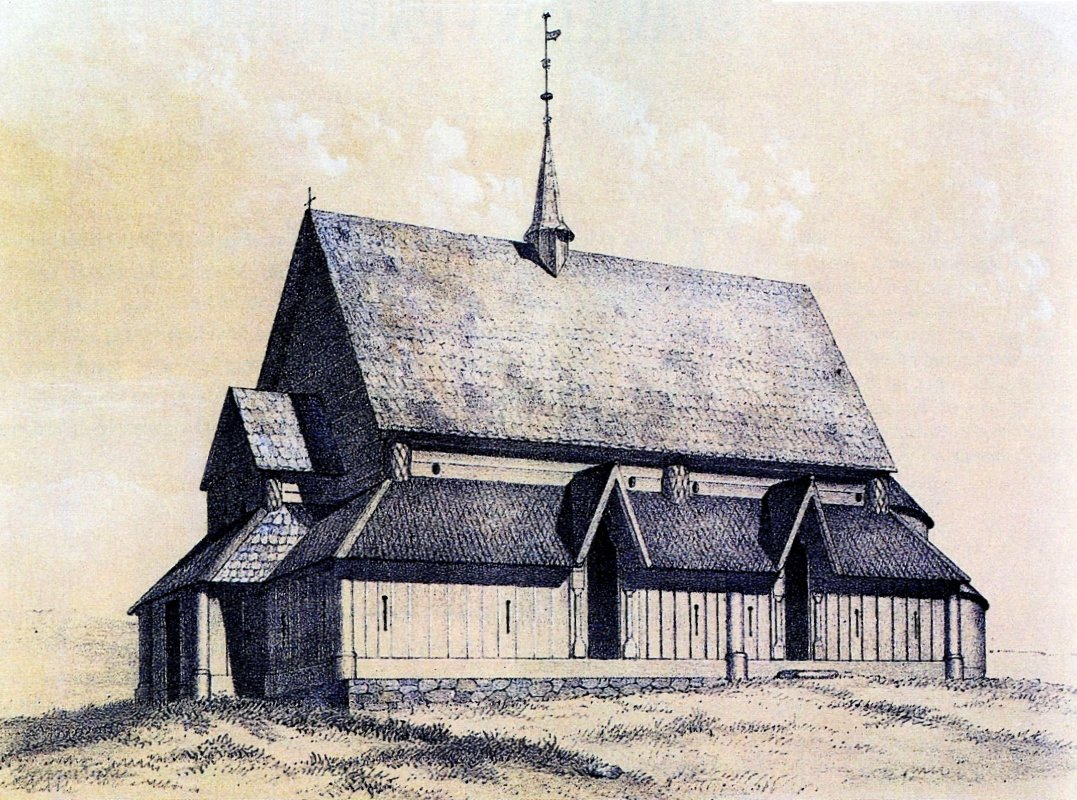
View of the church in 1855

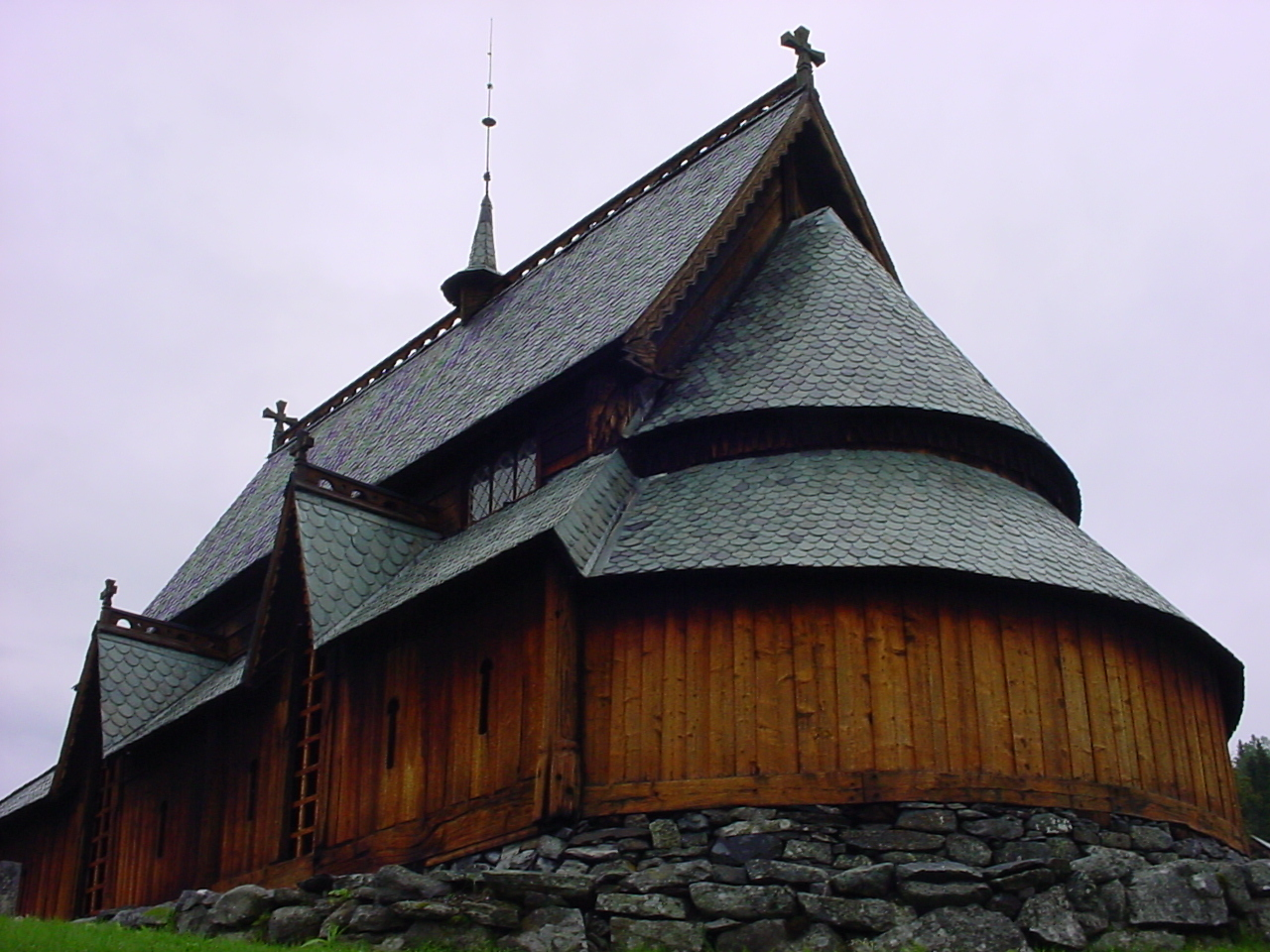

== See also ==
- List of churches in Hamar
