= Ingjerd Thon Hagaseth =

Norwegian politician (born 1967)

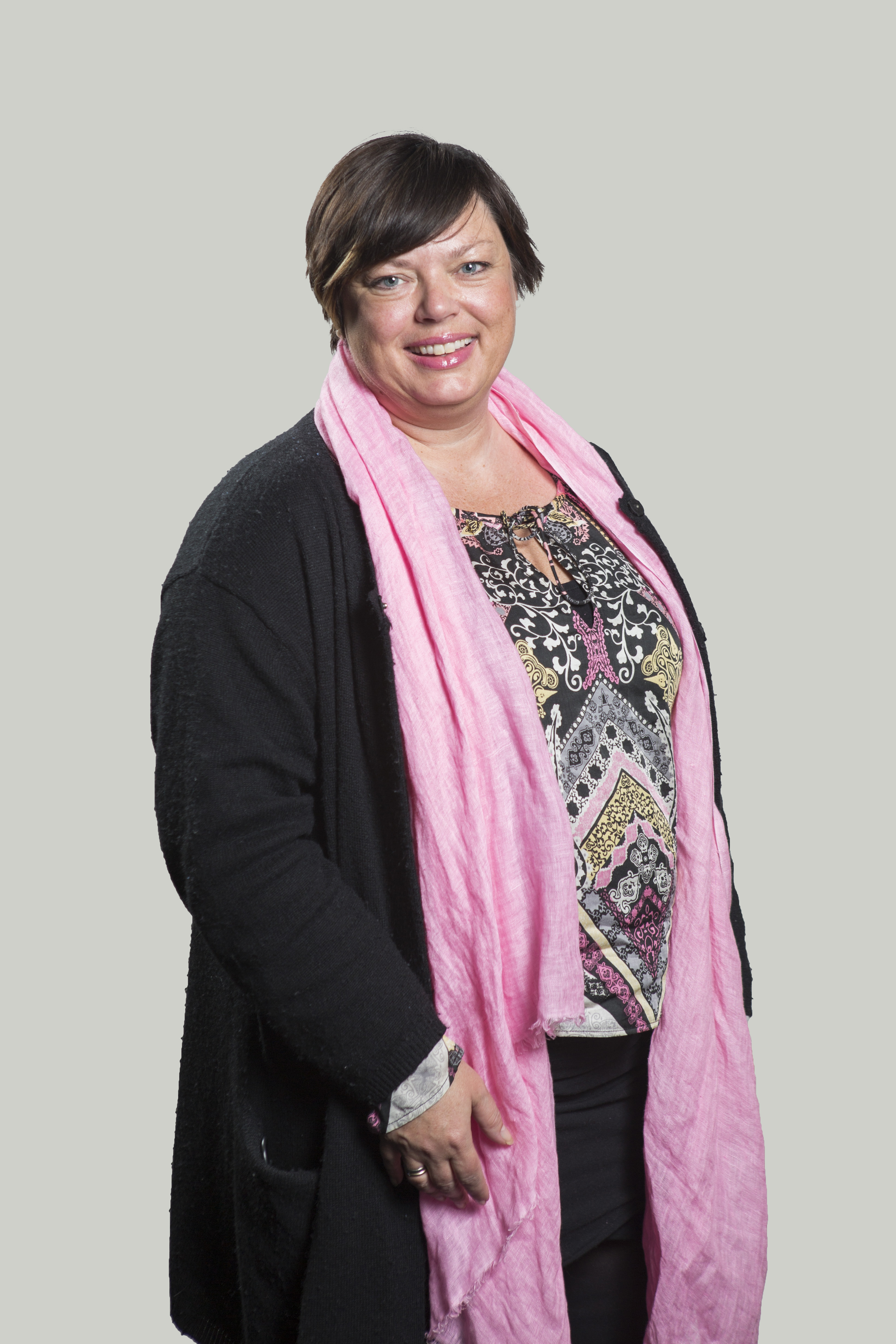
Portrait of Ingjerd Thon Hagaseth

Ingjerd Thon Hagaseth (born 17 December 1967) is a Norwegian politician for the Liberal Party.

She served as a deputy representative to the Parliament of Norway from Oppland during the term 2013–2017. She has been deputy mayor of Etnedal Municipality, is educated in science from the University of Oslo, and is a former school principal.
