= Reinli Chapel =

Church in Innlandet, Norway

- Reinli kapell
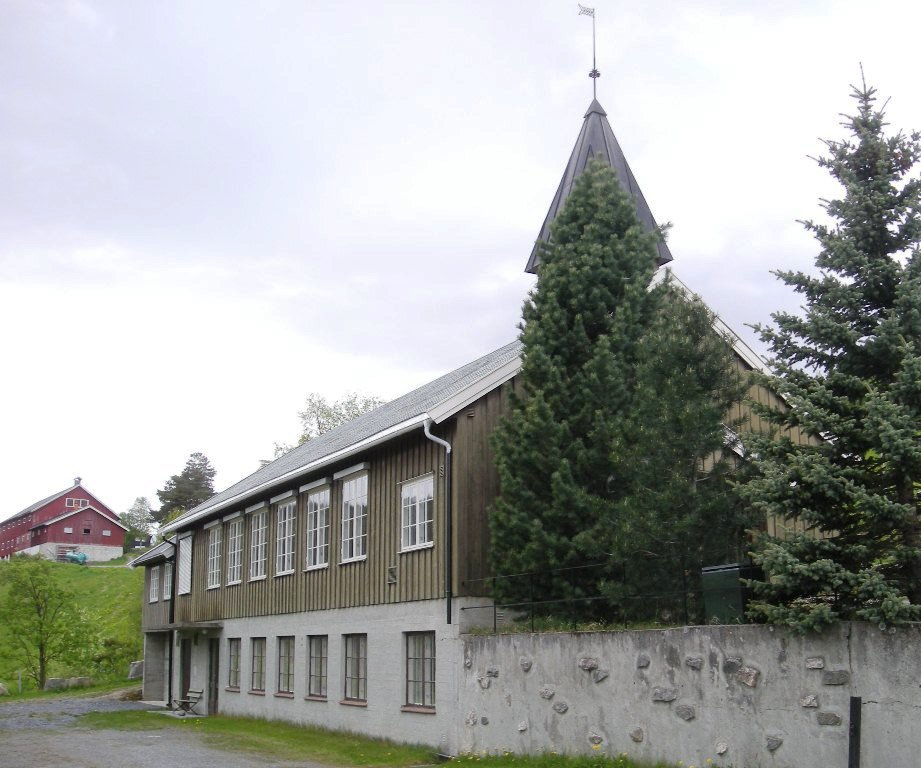
- View of the church
- Reinli Chapel
- 60°49′51″N 9°29′34″E
- Location: Sør-Aurdal, Innlandet
- Country: Norway
- Denomination: Church of Norway
- Churchmanship: Evangelical Lutheran

History
- Status: Parish church
- Founded: 1965
- Consecrated: 26 May 1965

Architecture
- Functional status: Active
- Architect: Kolbjørn Sukke
- Architectural type: Long church
- Completed: 1965 (61 years ago)

Specifications
- Capacity: 164
- Materials: Wood

Administration
- Diocese: Hamar bispedømme
- Deanery: Valdres prosti
- Parish: Reinli

Reinli Chapel (Norwegian: Reinli kapell) is a parish church of the Church of Norway in Sør-Aurdal Municipality in Innlandet county, Norway. It is located in the village of Reinli. It is the church for the Reinli parish which is part of the Valdres prosti (deanery) in the Diocese of Hamar. The brown, wooden church was built in a long church design in 1965 using plans drawn up by the architect Kolbjørn Sukke. The church seats about 164 people.

== History ==
The Reinli Stave Church served the parish for centuries. In 1948, discussions began about the future of the medieval church building. It was decided to build a new church for the parish and to take the old church out of regular use, but to save it as a historical site. The new church was designed by Kolbjørn Sukke and the lead builder was Arne T. Langedrag. This new building was to be constructed across the road from the old church. The new church is a wooden long church with the nave, chancel, and sacristy on the main floor. The lower-level houses a church hall and some smaller rooms. Construction took place in 1964 and the new building was consecrated on 26 May 1965, although they started using the building in late 1964. The new church became the main church for the parish, although it is titled as a chapel. The old church is used for special occasions, mostly in the summer.

== Media gallery ==
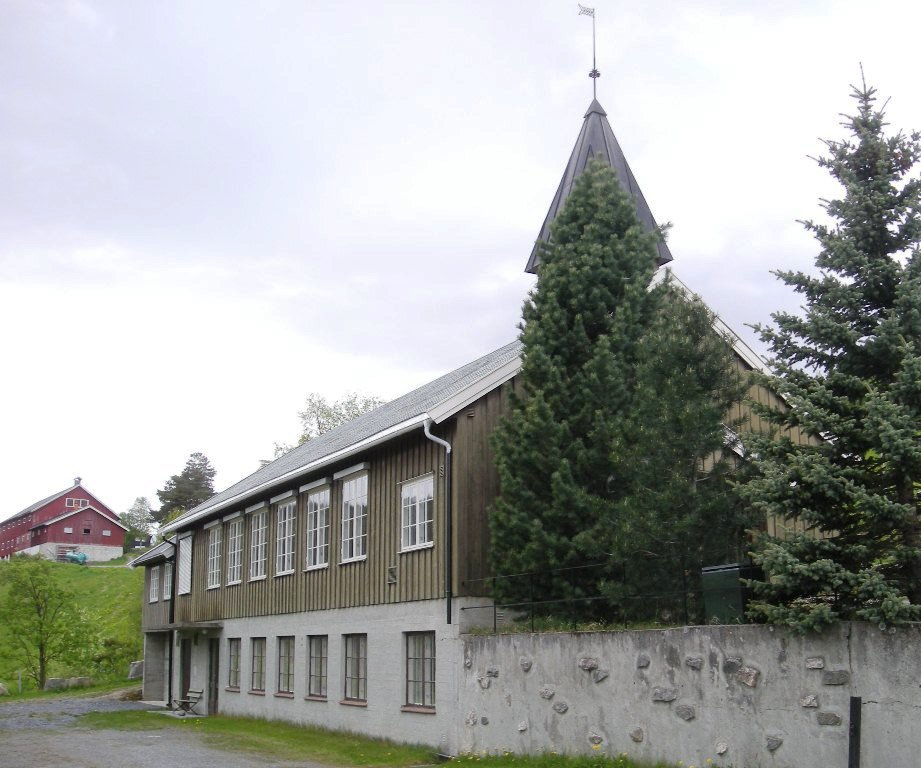

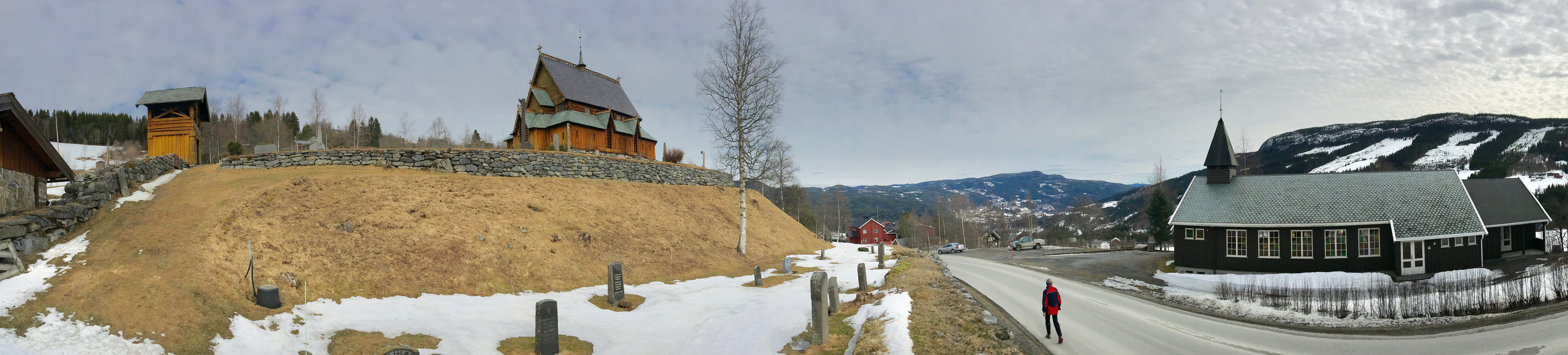

== See also ==
- List of churches in Hamar
