= Aurdal Church =

Church in Innlandet, Norway

- Aurdal kirke
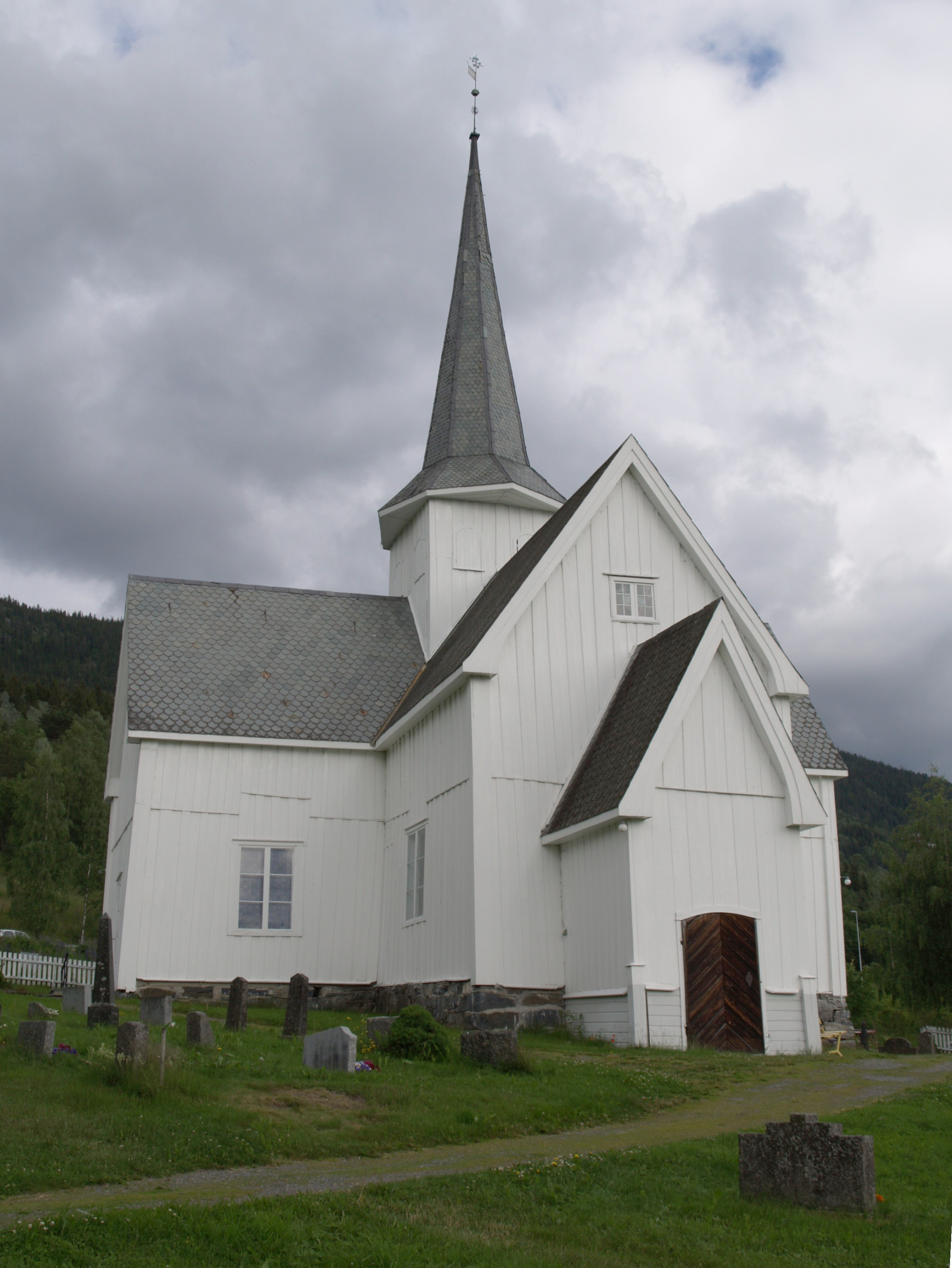
- View of the church
- Aurdal Church
- 60°55′29″N 9°24′49″E
- Location: Nord-Aurdal, Innlandet
- Country: Norway
- Denomination: Church of Norway
- Previous denomination: Catholic Church
- Churchmanship: Evangelical Lutheran

History
- Status: Parish church
- Founded: 12th century
- Consecrated: 22 February 1737

Architecture
- Functional status: Active
- Architect: Svend Tråseth
- Architectural type: Cruciform
- Completed: 1736 (290 years ago)

Specifications
- Capacity: 250
- Materials: Wood

Administration
- Diocese: Hamar bispedømme
- Deanery: Valdres prosti
- Parish: Aurdal
- Norwegian Cultural Heritage Site
- Type: Church
- Status: Automatically protected
- ID: 83813

Aurdal Church (Norwegian: Aurdal kirke) is a parish church of the Church of Norway in Nord-Aurdal Municipality in Innlandet county, Norway. It is located in the village of Aurdal. It is the church for the Aurdal parish which is part of the Valdres prosti (deanery) in the Diocese of Hamar. The white, wooden church was built in a cruciform design in 1736 using plans drawn up by the architect Svend Tråseth. The church seats about 250 people.

== History ==
The earliest existing historical records of the church date back to the year 1327, but the church was not built that year. The first church in Aurdal was a wooden stave church that was likely built during the 12th century (a baptismal font in the church has been dated to the years 1150–1200, so that is likely the time the church was first built). As early as 1665, there were plans for replacing the old stave church, but they were not acted upon for some time. Svend Tråseth was hired to design and build the new church. The old church was torn down in 1735 and construction of the new church took place in 1735–1736 on the same site as the old church. The new church was a wooden cruciform building with a central tower. The new building was consecrated on 22 February 1737 by the parish priest Peter Abelsted.

In 1814, this church served as an election church (Norwegian: valgkirke). Together with more than 300 other parish churches across Norway, it was a polling station for elections to the 1814 Norwegian Constituent Assembly which wrote the Constitution of Norway. This was Norway's first national elections. Each church parish was a constituency that elected people called "electors" who later met together in each county to elect the representatives for the assembly that was to meet at Eidsvoll Manor later that year.

In 1866, major structural repairs were carried out on the church tower and the foundation wall. In 1892, the church underwent a comprehensive repair which included the construction of a sacristy that was built on the east end of the choir which was in the eastern cross-arm.

== Media gallery ==
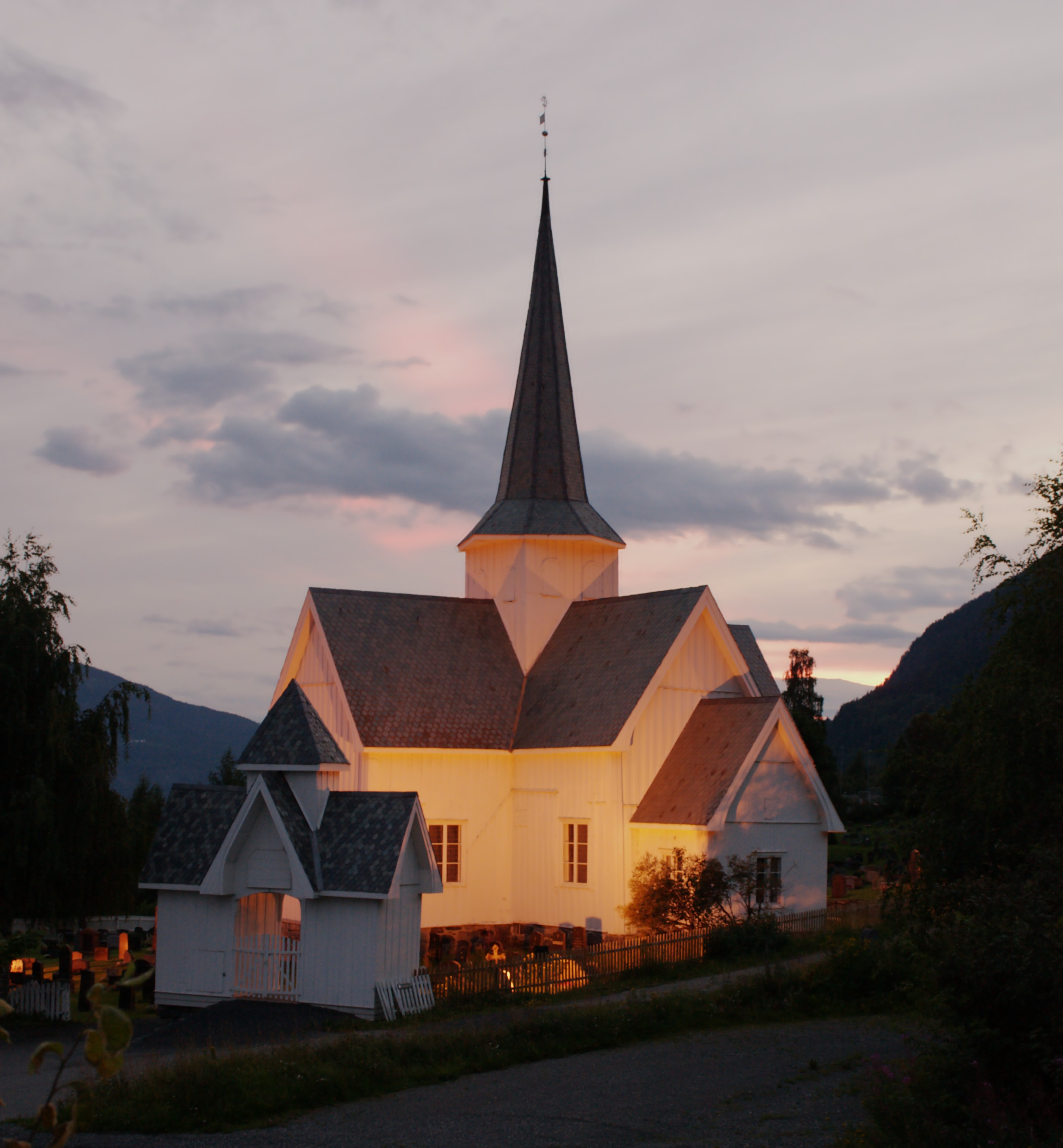

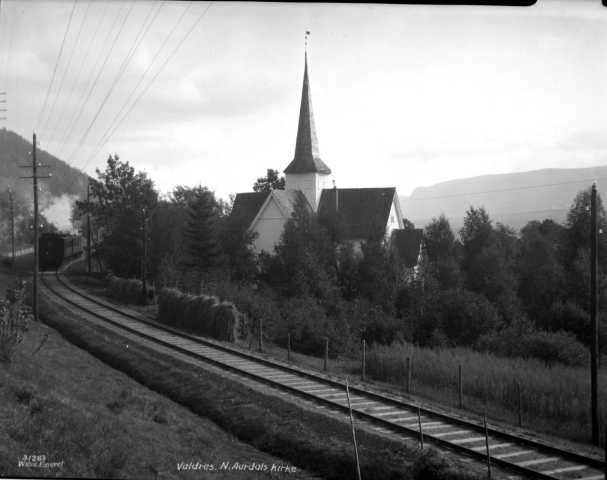

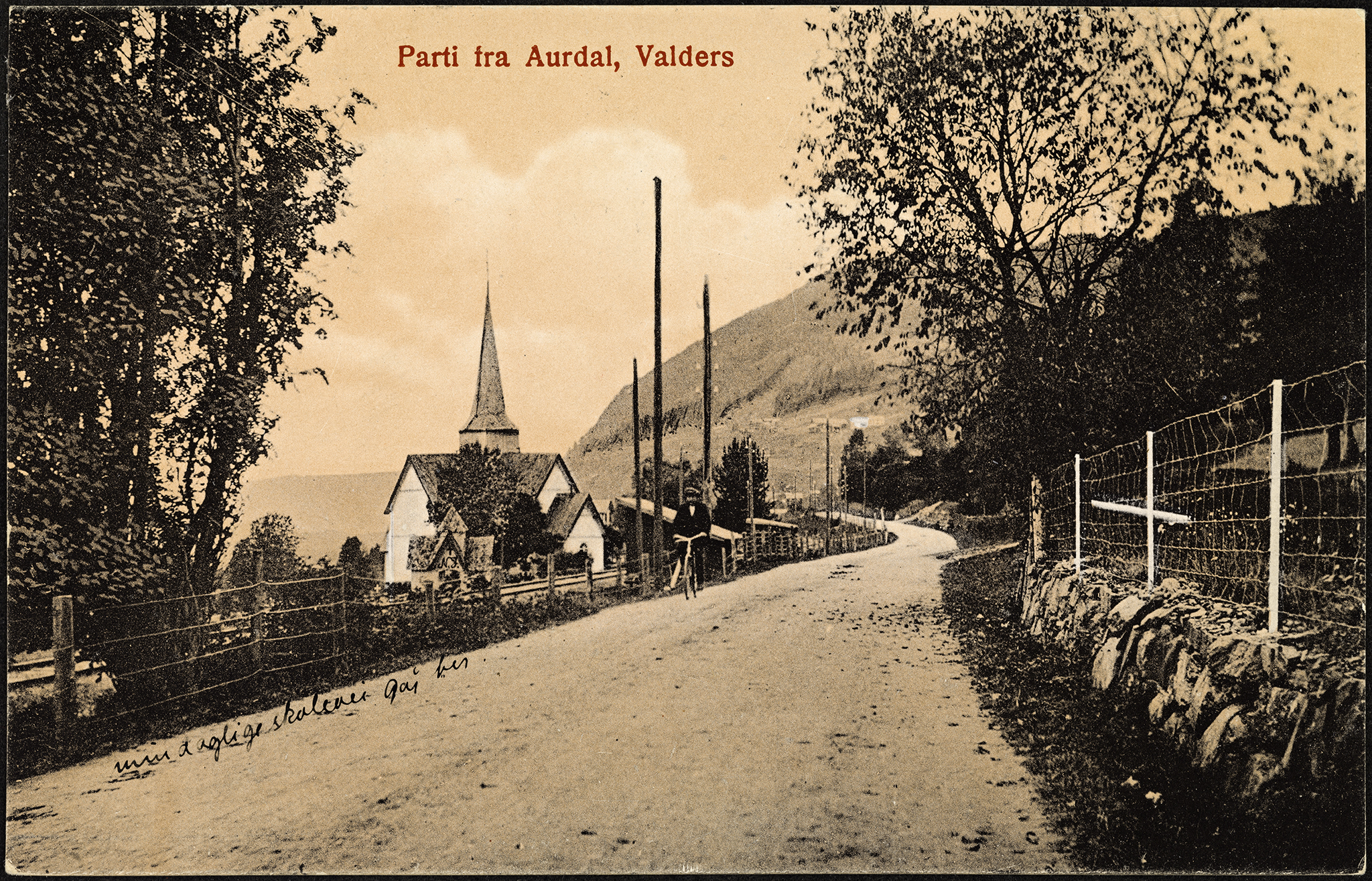

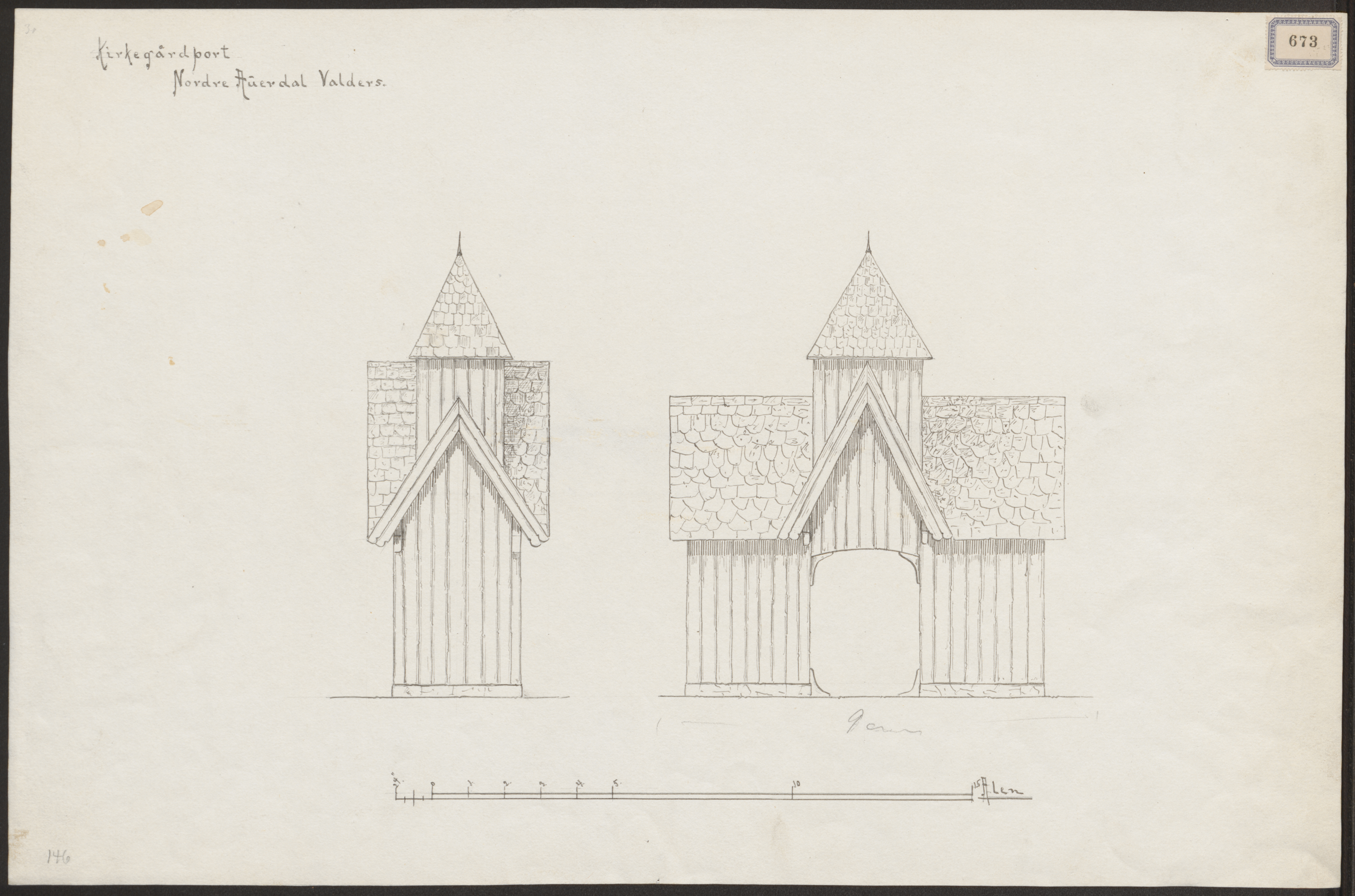

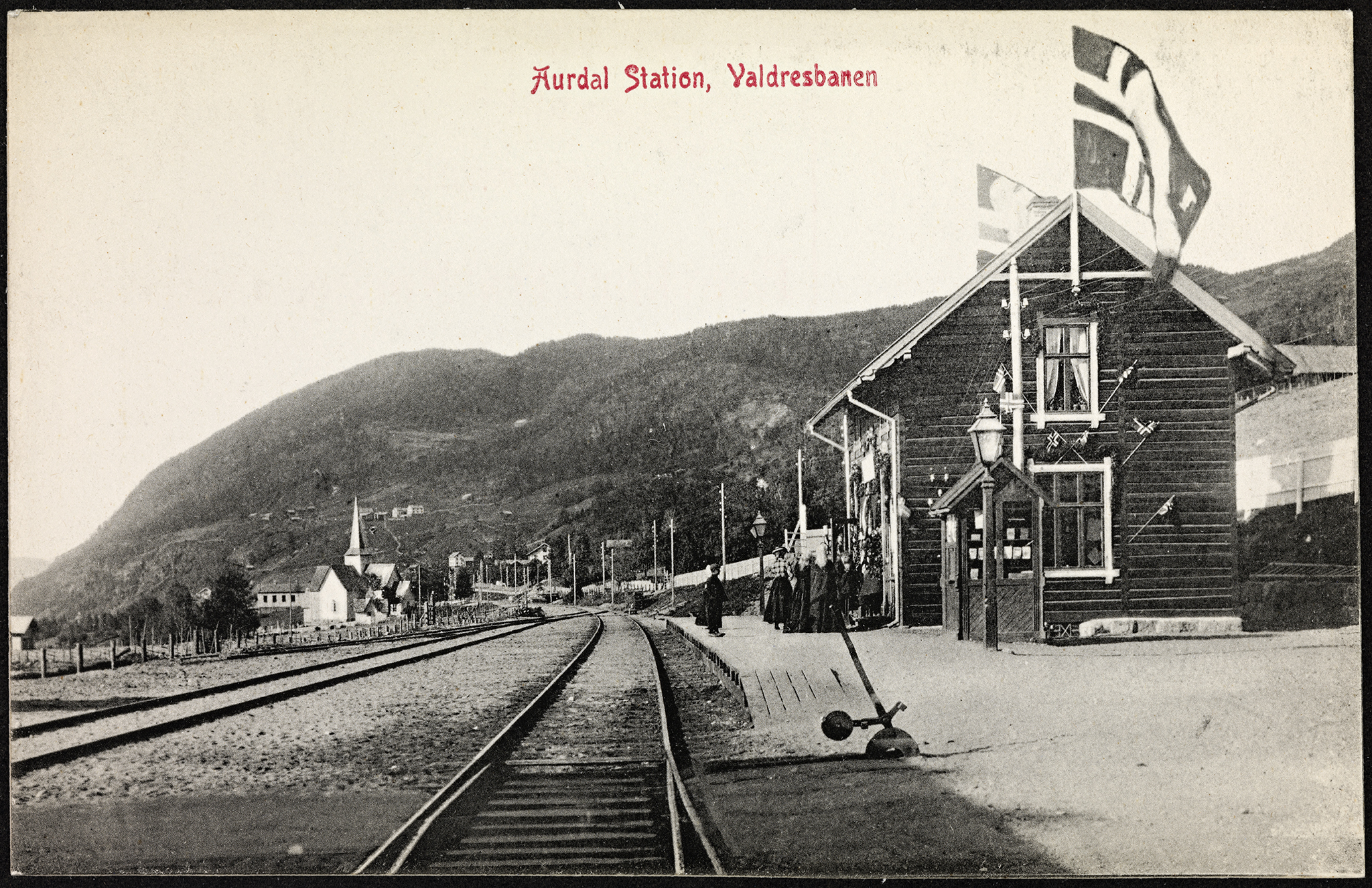

== See also ==
- List of churches in Hamar
