= Etnedal Municipality =

Municipality in Innlandet, Norway

Etnedal Municipality Etnedal kommune
- Municipality
- Etnedalen herred (historic name)
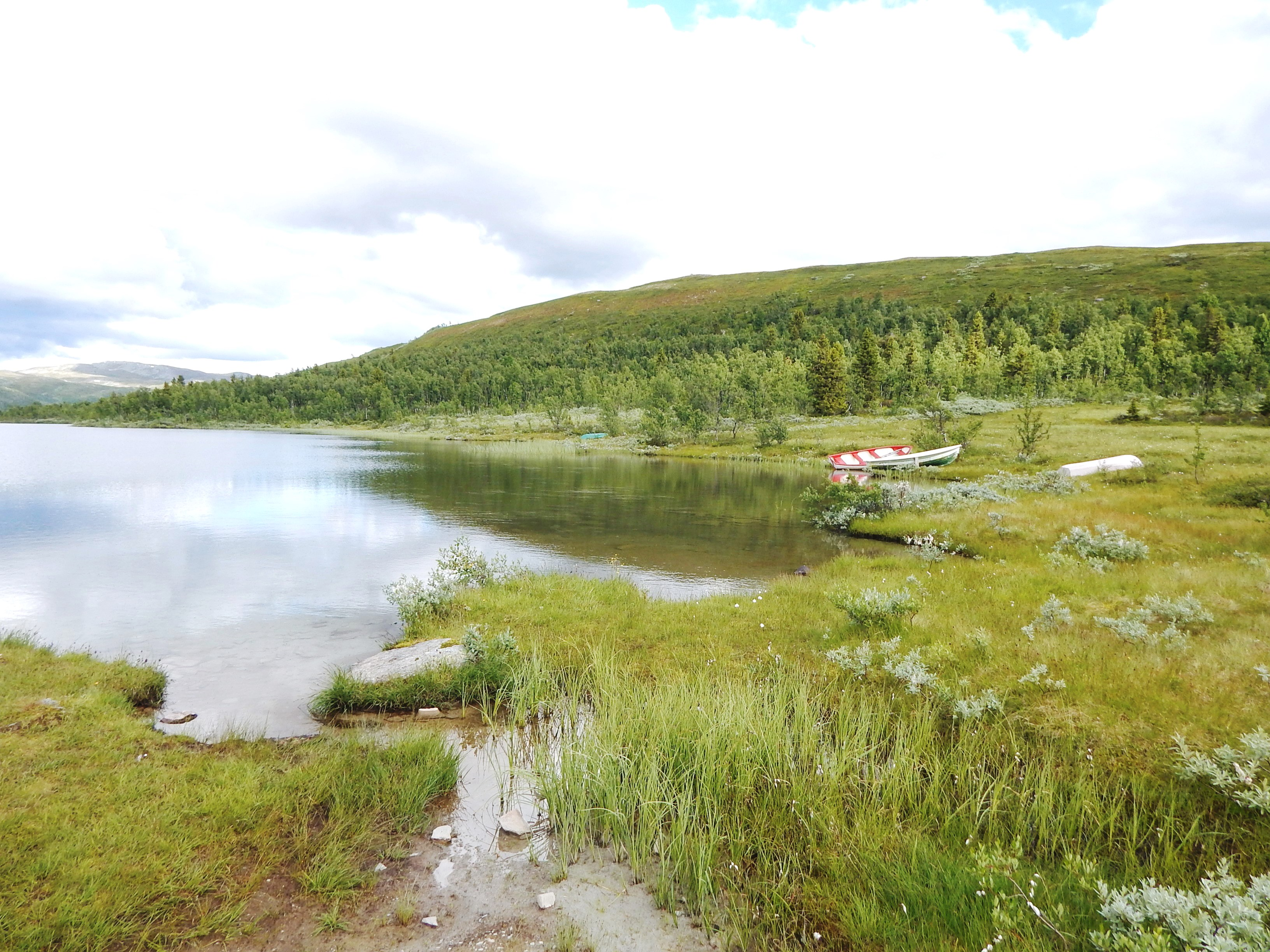
- View of the lake Hafsenn

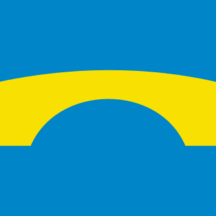
- Flag Coat of arms

- Innlandet within Norway

- Etnedal within Innlandet
- Coordinates: 60°58′2″N 9°39′13″E
- Country: Norway
- County: Innlandet
- District: Valdres
- Established: 1 Jan 1894
  - Preceded by: Nord-Aurdal Municipality and Sør-Aurdal Municipality
- Administrative centre: Bruflat

Government
  - Mayor (2019): Linda Mæhlum Robøle (Sp)

Area
  - Total: 459.14 km^{2} (177.27 sq mi)
  - Land: 442.77 km^{2} (170.95 sq mi)
  - Water: 16.37 km^{2} (6.32 sq mi) 3.6%
  - Rank: #215 in Norway
- Highest elevation: 1,413.84 m (4,638.6 ft)

Population (2025)
  - Total: 1,254
  - Rank: #318 in Norway
  - Density: 2.7/km^{2} (7.0/sq mi)
  - Change (10 years): ▼ −3%
- Demonym: Etnedøl

Official language
  - Norwegian form: Neutral
- Time zone: UTC+01:00 (CET)
  - Summer (DST): UTC+02:00 (CEST)
- ISO 3166 code: NO-3450
- Website: Official website

Etnedal is a municipality in Innlandet county, Norway. It is located in the traditional district of Valdres. The administrative centre of the municipality is the village of Bruflat.

The 459.14-square-kilometre (177.27 sq mi) municipality is the 215th largest by area out of the 357 municipalities in Norway. Etnedal Municipality is the 318th most populous municipality in Norway with a population of 1,254. The municipality's population density is 2.7 inhabitants per square kilometre (7.0/sq mi) and its population has decreased by 3% over the previous 10-year period.

== General information ==
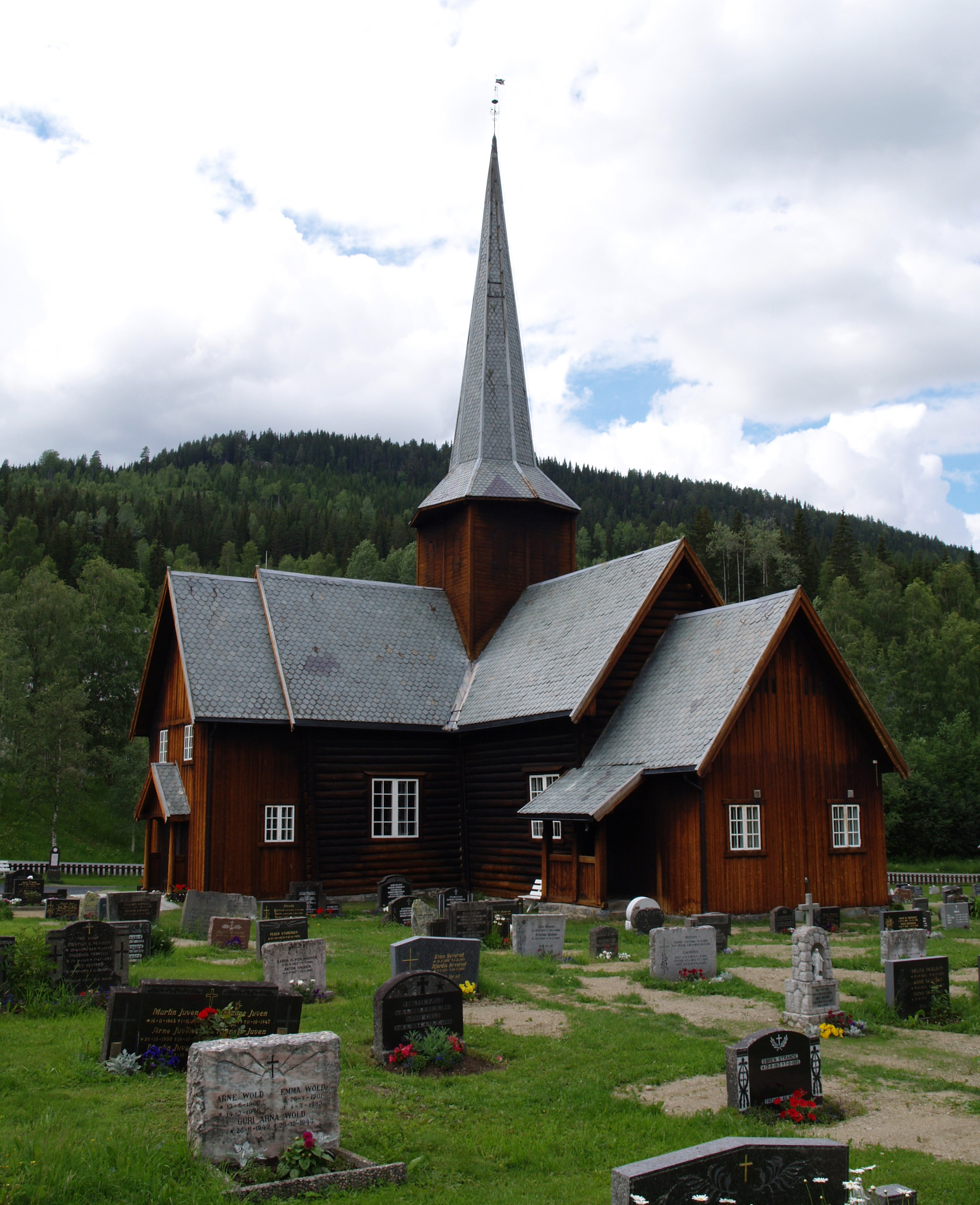
Bruflat church

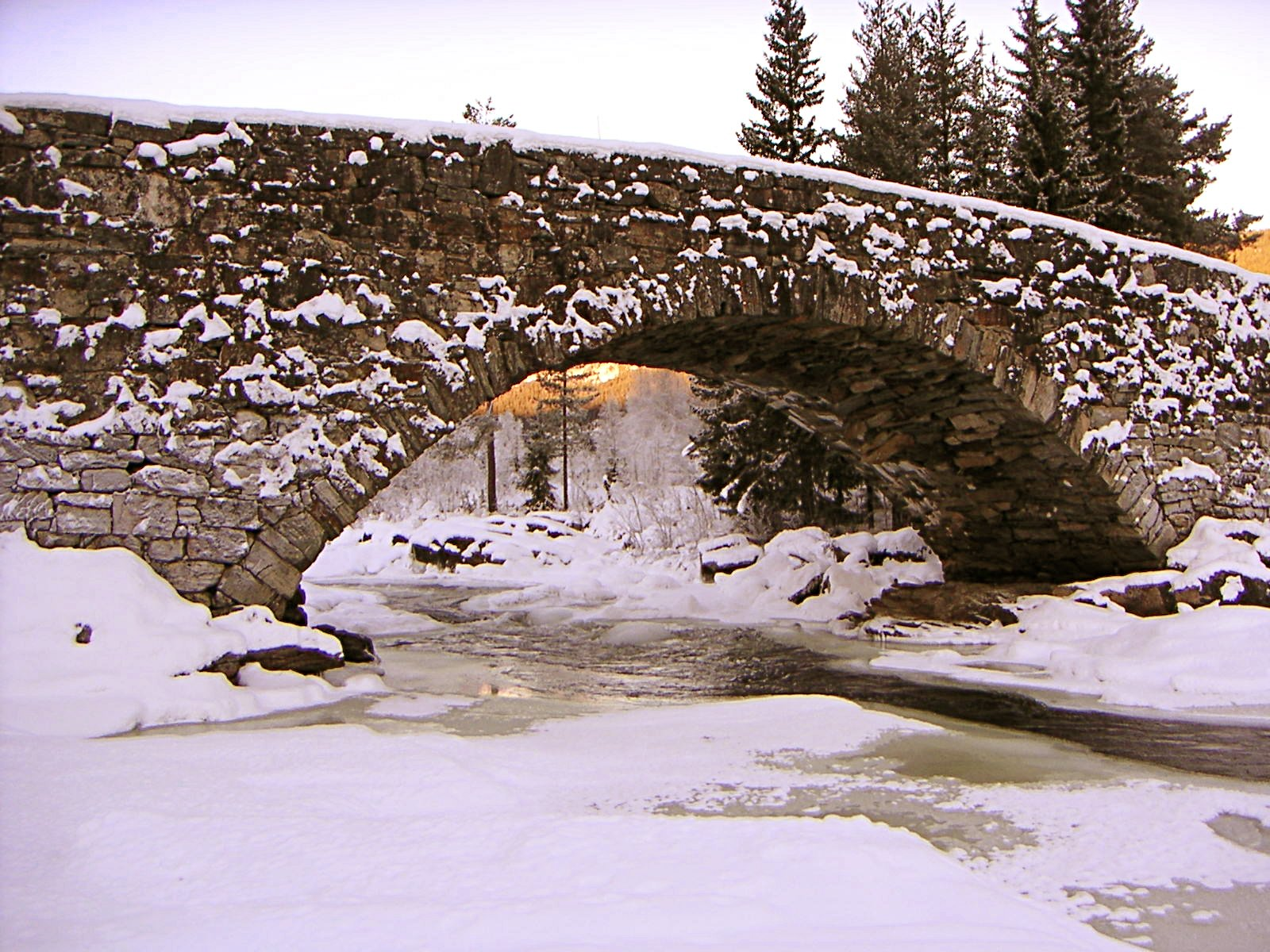
Lunde bridge - the inspiration for the municipal arms

Etnedal Municipality was established on 1 January 1894 after the eastern Nordre Etnedal valley area (population: 362) from Nord-Aurdal Municipality and the Søndre Etnedal valley area (population: 1,331) from Sør-Aurdal Municipality were merged. On 1 January 1979, there was a border adjustment in an unpopulated area where part of Etnedal Municipality was transferred to Nord-Aurdal Municipality and another unpopulated part of Nord-Aurdal Municipality was transferred to Etnedal Municipality.

Historically, this municipality was part of the old Oppland county. On 1 January 2020, the municipality became a part of the newly-formed Innlandet county (after Hedmark and Oppland counties were merged).

=== Name ===
The municipality (originally the parish) is named after the Etnedalen valley (Old Norse: Etnardalr) since it was a central geographic feature of the municipality. The first element is the genitive case of local Etna river Etn. The meaning of the river name is uncertain but it is possibly derived from etja which means to "push forward" or from eta which means to "eat". The last element is dalr which means "valley" or "dale". Historically, the name of the municipality was spelled Etnedalen. On 3 November 1917, a royal resolution changed the spelling of the name of the municipality to Etnedal, removing the definite form ending -en.

=== Coat of arms ===
The coat of arms was granted by royal decree on 14 July 1989. The official blazon is "Azure, an arched bridge Or" (Norwegian: På blå grunn ei gull kvelvingsbru). This means the arms have a blue field (background) and the charge is an arched bridge. The bridge has a tincture of Or which means it is commonly colored yellow, but if it is made out of metal, then gold is used. The arms were designed to symbolize the old Lunde bridge (Lundebru) which is one of the best preserved stone bridges in Norway. The bridge is now a national monument. It is also Northern Europe's largest dry stone-arch bridge. The bridge was built in 1829 on the Old King's Road connecting the cities of Oslo and Bergen. A portion of the king's road was refurbished and turned into a footpath in 1992 and is now a natural and cultural walking path. The arms were designed by Ivar Aars. The municipal flag has the same design as the coat of arms.

=== Churches ===
The Church of Norway has two parishes (sokn) within Etnedal Municipality. It is part of the Valdres prosti (deanery) in the Diocese of Hamar.

Churches in Etnedal Municipality
| Parish (sokn) | Church name | Location of the church | Year built |
|---|---|---|---|
| Etnedal | Bruflat Church | Bruflat | 1750 |
| Nord-Etnedal | Nord-Etnedal Church | Brøtahaugen | 1866 |

== Geography ==
Etnedal Municipality is part of the traditional district of Valdres in central, southern Norway, situated between the Gudbrandsdal and Hallingdal valleys. Valdres also includes the municipalities of Nord-Aurdal, Sør-Aurdal, Øystre Slidre, Vestre Slidre, and Vang.

Etnedal Municipality is bordered to the east by Nordre Land Municipality, to the south by Sør-Aurdal Municipality, and on the west and north by Nord-Aurdal Municipality. The river Etna flows through the municipality, then into Nordre Land Municipality and then down into Randsfjorden. The highest point in the municipality is the 1,413.84-metre (4,638.6 ft) tall mountain Spåtind, in the northern part of the municipality.

== Government ==
Etnedal Municipality is responsible for primary education (through 10th grade), outpatient health services, senior citizen services, welfare and other social services, zoning, economic development, and municipal roads and utilities. The municipality is governed by a municipal council of directly elected representatives. The mayor is indirectly elected by a vote of the municipal council. The municipality is under the jurisdiction of the Vestoppland og Valdres District Court and the Eidsivating Court of Appeal.

=== Municipal council ===
The municipal council (Kommunestyre) of Etnedal Municipality is made up of 15 representatives that are elected to four year terms. The tables below show the current and historical composition of the council by political party.

Etnedal kommunestyre 2023–2027
| Party name (in Norwegian) | Number of representatives |
|---|---|
| Labour Party (Arbeiderpartiet) | 4 |
| Progress Party (Fremskrittspartiet) | 3 |
| Christian Democratic Party (Kristelig Folkeparti) | 1 |
| Centre Party (Senterpartiet) | 7 |
| Total number of members: | 15 |

Etnedal kommunestyre 2019–2023
| Party name (in Norwegian) | Number of representatives |
|---|---|
| Labour Party (Arbeiderpartiet) | 5 |
| Progress Party (Fremskrittspartiet) | 1 |
| Centre Party (Senterpartiet) | 7 |
| Joint list of the Conservative Party (Høyre), Christian Democratic Party (Kristelig Folkeparti), and Liberal Party (Venstre) | 2 |
| Total number of members: | 15 |

Etnedal kommunestyre 2015–2019
| Party name (in Norwegian) | Number of representatives |
|---|---|
| Labour Party (Arbeiderpartiet) | 6 |
| Conservative Party (Høyre) | 2 |
| Christian Democratic Party (Kristelig Folkeparti) | 1 |
| Centre Party (Senterpartiet) | 5 |
| Liberal Party (Venstre) | 1 |
| Total number of members: | 15 |

Etnedal kommunestyre 2011–2015
| Party name (in Norwegian) | Number of representatives |
|---|---|
| Labour Party (Arbeiderpartiet) | 5 |
| Conservative Party (Høyre) | 3 |
| Centre Party (Senterpartiet) | 6 |
| Liberal Party (Venstre) | 1 |
| Total number of members: | 15 |

Etnedal kommunestyre 2007–2011
| Party name (in Norwegian) | Number of representatives |
|---|---|
| Labour Party (Arbeiderpartiet) | 3 |
| Conservative Party (Høyre) | 2 |
| Christian Democratic Party (Kristelig Folkeparti) | 1 |
| Centre Party (Senterpartiet) | 6 |
| Socialist Left Party (Sosialistisk Venstreparti) | 1 |
| Liberal Party (Venstre) | 2 |
| Total number of members: | 15 |

Etnedal kommunestyre 2003–2007
| Party name (in Norwegian) | Number of representatives |
|---|---|
| Labour Party (Arbeiderpartiet) | 5 |
| Conservative Party (Høyre) | 1 |
| Christian Democratic Party (Kristelig Folkeparti) | 1 |
| Centre Party (Senterpartiet) | 7 |
| Socialist Left Party (Sosialistisk Venstreparti) | 1 |
| Liberal Party (Venstre) | 2 |
| Total number of members: | 17 |

Etnedal kommunestyre 1999–2003
| Party name (in Norwegian) | Number of representatives |
|---|---|
| Labour Party (Arbeiderpartiet) | 4 |
| Conservative Party (Høyre) | 1 |
| Christian Democratic Party (Kristelig Folkeparti) | 1 |
| Centre Party (Senterpartiet) | 8 |
| Liberal Party (Venstre) | 1 |
| Etnedal independent local list (Etnedal uavhengig bygdeliste) | 2 |
| Total number of members: | 17 |

Etnedal kommunestyre 1995–1999
| Party name (in Norwegian) | Number of representatives |
|---|---|
| Labour Party (Arbeiderpartiet) | 4 |
| Conservative Party (Høyre) | 1 |
| Christian Democratic Party (Kristelig Folkeparti) | 1 |
| Centre Party (Senterpartiet) | 6 |
| Liberal Party (Venstre) | 2 |
| Etnedal non-party local list (Etnedal upolitiske bygdeliste) | 3 |
| Total number of members: | 17 |

Etnedal kommunestyre 1991–1995
| Party name (in Norwegian) | Number of representatives |
|---|---|
| Labour Party (Arbeiderpartiet) | 7 |
| Conservative Party (Høyre) | 1 |
| Christian Democratic Party (Kristelig Folkeparti) | 1 |
| Centre Party (Senterpartiet) | 6 |
| Liberal Party (Venstre) | 2 |
| Total number of members: | 17 |

Etnedal kommunestyre 1987–1991
| Party name (in Norwegian) | Number of representatives |
|---|---|
| Labour Party (Arbeiderpartiet) | 7 |
| Conservative Party (Høyre) | 1 |
| Christian Democratic Party (Kristelig Folkeparti) | 1 |
| Centre Party (Senterpartiet) | 6 |
| Liberal Party (Venstre) | 2 |
| Total number of members: | 17 |

Etnedal kommunestyre 1983–1987
| Party name (in Norwegian) | Number of representatives |
|---|---|
| Labour Party (Arbeiderpartiet) | 8 |
| Conservative Party (Høyre) | 2 |
| Christian Democratic Party (Kristelig Folkeparti) | 2 |
| Centre Party (Senterpartiet) | 4 |
| Liberal Party (Venstre) | 1 |
| Total number of members: | 17 |

Etnedal kommunestyre 1979–1983
| Party name (in Norwegian) | Number of representatives |
|---|---|
| Labour Party (Arbeiderpartiet) | 7 |
| Conservative Party (Høyre) | 2 |
| Christian Democratic Party (Kristelig Folkeparti) | 2 |
| Centre Party (Senterpartiet) | 4 |
| Socialist Left Party (Sosialistisk Venstreparti) | 1 |
| Liberal Party (Venstre) | 1 |
| Total number of members: | 17 |

Etnedal kommunestyre 1975–1979
| Party name (in Norwegian) | Number of representatives |
|---|---|
| Labour Party (Arbeiderpartiet) | 7 |
| Christian Democratic Party (Kristelig Folkeparti) | 3 |
| Centre Party (Senterpartiet) | 4 |
| Liberal Party (Venstre) | 3 |
| Total number of members: | 17 |

Etnedal kommunestyre 1971–1975
| Party name (in Norwegian) | Number of representatives |
|---|---|
| Labour Party (Arbeiderpartiet) | 8 |
| Conservative Party (Høyre) | 1 |
| Christian Democratic Party (Kristelig Folkeparti) | 2 |
| Centre Party (Senterpartiet) | 4 |
| Liberal Party (Venstre) | 2 |
| Total number of members: | 17 |

Etnedal kommunestyre 1967–1971
| Party name (in Norwegian) | Number of representatives |
|---|---|
| Labour Party (Arbeiderpartiet) | 7 |
| Conservative Party (Høyre) | 1 |
| Christian Democratic Party (Kristelig Folkeparti) | 2 |
| Centre Party (Senterpartiet) | 1 |
| Liberal Party (Venstre) | 4 |
| Local List(s) (Lokale lister) | 2 |
| Total number of members: | 17 |

Etnedal kommunestyre 1963–1967
| Party name (in Norwegian) | Number of representatives |
|---|---|
| Labour Party (Arbeiderpartiet) | 7 |
| Conservative Party (Høyre) | 2 |
| Christian Democratic Party (Kristelig Folkeparti) | 2 |
| Centre Party (Senterpartiet) | 2 |
| Liberal Party (Venstre) | 4 |
| Total number of members: | 17 |

Etnedal herredsstyre 1959–1963
| Party name (in Norwegian) | Number of representatives |
|---|---|
| Labour Party (Arbeiderpartiet) | 6 |
| Conservative Party (Høyre) | 2 |
| Christian Democratic Party (Kristelig Folkeparti) | 2 |
| Centre Party (Senterpartiet) | 2 |
| Liberal Party (Venstre) | 5 |
| Total number of members: | 17 |

Etnedal herredsstyre 1955–1959
| Party name (in Norwegian) | Number of representatives |
|---|---|
| Labour Party (Arbeiderpartiet) | 8 |
| Christian Democratic Party (Kristelig Folkeparti) | 2 |
| Liberal Party (Venstre) | 4 |
| Joint List(s) of Non-Socialist Parties (Borgerlige Felleslister) | 3 |
| Total number of members: | 17 |

Etnedal herredsstyre 1951–1955
| Party name (in Norwegian) | Number of representatives |
|---|---|
| Labour Party (Arbeiderpartiet) | 7 |
| Christian Democratic Party (Kristelig Folkeparti) | 3 |
| Farmers' Party (Bondepartiet) | 2 |
| Liberal Party (Venstre) | 4 |
| Total number of members: | 16 |

Etnedal herredsstyre 1947–1951
| Party name (in Norwegian) | Number of representatives |
|---|---|
| Labour Party (Arbeiderpartiet) | 4 |
| Farmers' Party (Bondepartiet) | 3 |
| Joint list of the Liberal Party (Venstre) and the Radical People's Party (Radikale Folkepartiet) | 5 |
| Local List(s) (Lokale lister) | 4 |
| Total number of members: | 16 |

Etnedal herredsstyre 1945–1947
| Party name (in Norwegian) | Number of representatives |
|---|---|
| Labour Party (Arbeiderpartiet) | 5 |
| Farmers' Party (Bondepartiet) | 3 |
| Joint list of the Liberal Party (Venstre) and the Radical People's Party (Radikale Folkepartiet) | 4 |
| Local List(s) (Lokale lister) | 4 |
| Total number of members: | 16 |

Etnedal herredsstyre 1937–1940*
| Party name (in Norwegian) | Number of representatives |
|---|---|
| Labour Party (Arbeiderpartiet) | 6 |
| Farmers' Party (Bondepartiet) | 4 |
| Joint list of the Liberal Party (Venstre) and the Radical People's Party (Radikale Folkepartiet) | 6 |
| Total number of members: | 16 |
Note: Due to the German occupation of Norway during World War II, no elections were held for new municipal councils until after the war ended in 1945.

=== Mayors ===
The mayor (Norwegian: ordfører) of Etnedal Municipality is the political leader of the municipality and the chairperson of the municipal council. Here is a list of people who have held this position:

- 1894–1900: Arild Huitfeldt Siewers
- 1900–1901: Nils Hagaseth
- 1901–1904: Erik Thon
- 1904–1907: Aslak E. Bruflat
- 1907–1913: Engebret Espelien
- 1913–1919: Nils Nielsen
- 1919–1922: Carl Christian Wishman
- 1922–1925: Ole E. Bruflat (V)
- 1925–1928: Martin Lundstein (V)
- 1928–1931: Ole E. Bruflat (V)
- 1931–1934: Engebret Haug
- 1934–1937: Ole E. Bruflat (V)
- 1937–1940: Torleiv Hodne (Ap)
- 1940–1945: (Vacant due to the war)
- 1946–1959: Iver K. Haug (V)
- 1960–1967: Nicolai Hestekind (H)
- 1968–1974: Ole Fløgum (Ap)
- 1975–1975: Kristian Midthus (Sp)
- 1976–1979: Alfred Steinset (KrF)
- 1980–1983: Knut Engelien (Sp)
- 1984–1999: Odd Byfuglien (Sp)
- 1999–2014: Jan Arild Berg (Sp)
- 2014–2019: Toril Grønbrekk (Ap)
- 2019–present: Linda Mæhlum Robøle (Sp)

== Economy ==
Number of minorities (1st and 2nd generation) in Etnedal by country of origin in 2017
| Ancestry | Number |
|---|---|
| Syria | 27 |
| Eritrea | 22 |
| Netherlands | 18 |

Occupations in the municipality include animal husbandry and logging, but there is also some industry and tourism.

== Notable people ==
- Sigurd Lybeck (1895 in Etnedal – 1975), a writer who wrote Jens von Bustenskjold
- Iacob Dybwad Sømme (1898 in Etnedal – 1944), an ichthyologist and Norwegian resistance movement
- Ingjerd Thon Hagaseth (born 1967), a Norwegian politician and deputy mayor of Etnedal Municipality
- Ingebjørg Saglien Bråten (born 1999 in Etnedal), a ski jumper
