= Bruflat =

Village in Etnedal, Norway

- Village
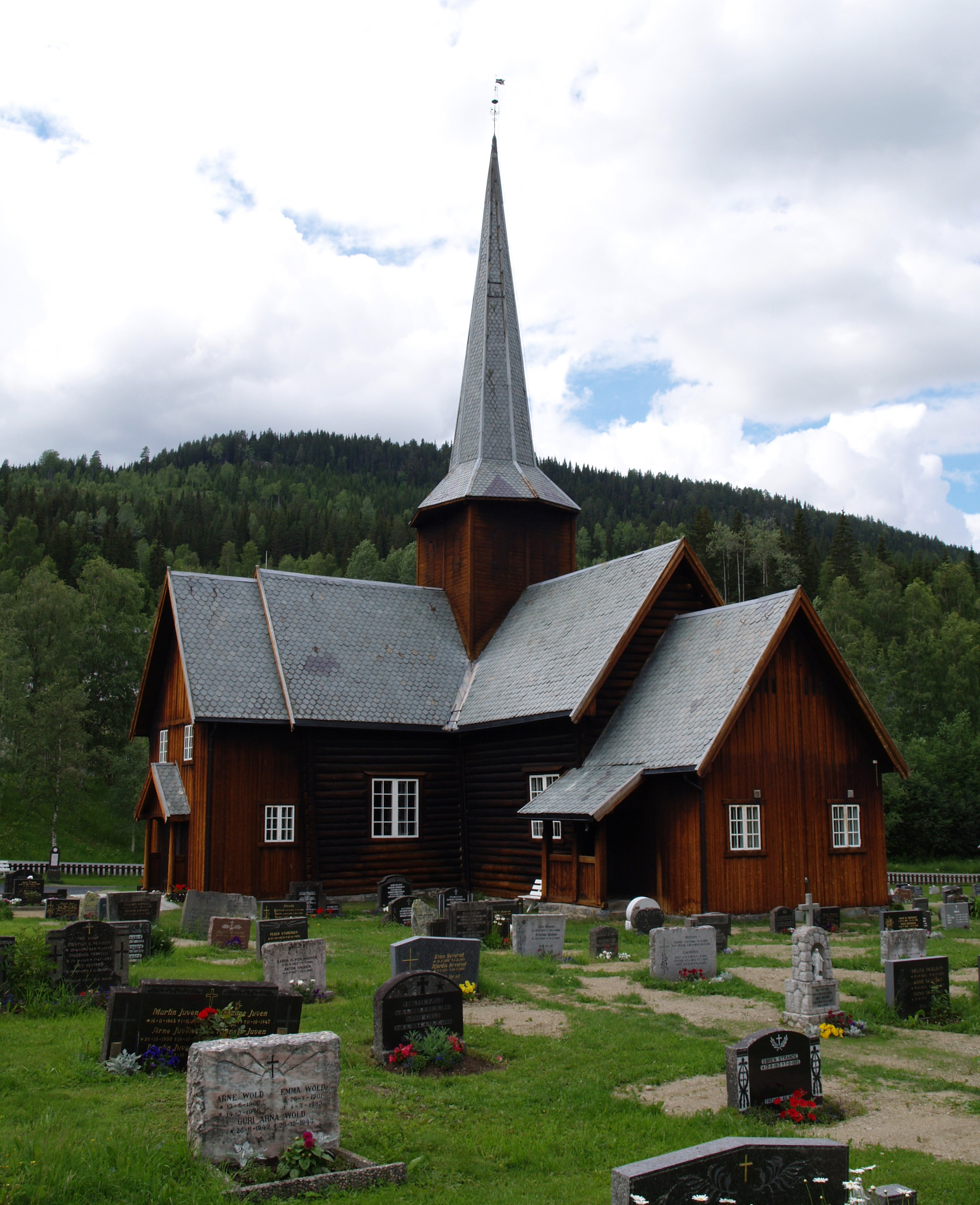
- View of the village church
- Interactive map of Bruflat
- Location within Innlandet Location within Norway
- Coordinates: 60.88866°N 9.6433°E
- Country: Norway
- Region: Eastern Norway
- County: Innlandet
- District: Valdres
- Municipality: Etnedal Municipality

Area
  - Total: 0.42 km^{2} (0.16 sq mi)
- Elevation: 329 m (1,079 ft)

Population (2024)
  - Total: 228
  - Density: 543/km^{2} (1,410/sq mi)
- Time zone: UTC+01:00 (CET)
  - Summer (DST): UTC+02:00 (CEST)
- Post Code: 2890 Etnedal

Bruflat is the administrative centre of Etnedal Municipality in Innlandet county, Norway. The village is located along the river Etna, about 10 kilometres (6.2 mi) to the northeast of the village of Bagn and about 26 kilometres (16 mi) to the northwest of the village of Dokka.

The 0.42-square-kilometre (100-acre) village has a population (2024) of 228 and a population density of 543 inhabitants per square kilometre (1,410/sq mi).

The village originally belonged to Sør-Aurdal Municipality, but on 1 January 1894 the whole parish was split away, together with Nord-Etnedal parish, to create the new Etnedal Municipality.
