= Hval Church =

Church in Buskerud, Norway

- Hval kirke
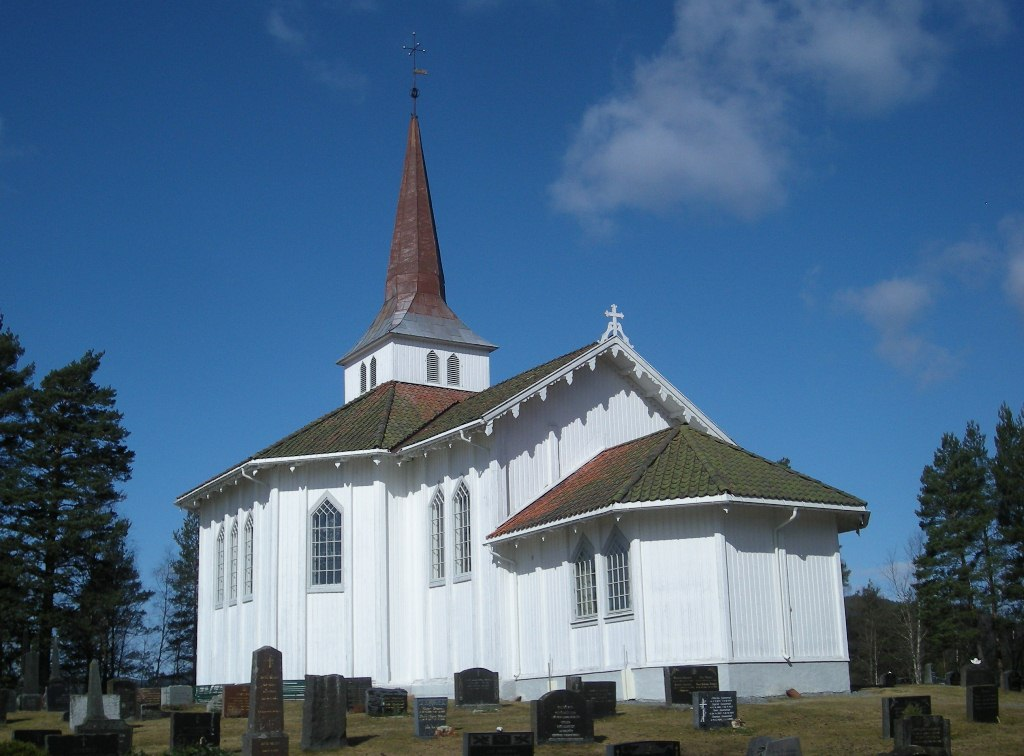
- View of the church
- Hval Church
- 60°16′04″N 10°10′29″E
- Location: Ringerike, Buskerud
- Country: Norway
- Denomination: Church of Norway
- Churchmanship: Evangelical Lutheran

History
- Status: Parish church
- Founded: 1862
- Consecrated: 9 Oct 1862

Architecture
- Functional status: Active
- Architect: Christian H. Grosch
- Architectural type: Long church
- Completed: 1862 (164 years ago)

Specifications
- Capacity: 250
- Materials: Wood

Administration
- Diocese: Tunsberg
- Deanery: Ringerike prosti
- Parish: Hval
- Norwegian Cultural Heritage Site
- Type: Church
- Status: Not protected
- ID: 84678

Hval Church (Norwegian: Hval kirke) is a parish church of the Church of Norway in Ringerike Municipality in Buskerud county, Norway. It is located in the village of Hallingby. It is the church for the Hval parish which is part of the Ringerike prosti (deanery) in the Diocese of Tunsberg. The white, wooden church was built in an octagonal design in 1862 using plans drawn up by the architect Christian Heinrich Grosch. The church seats about 250 people.

== History ==
There may have been a church in the Hallingby area during the Middle Ages, but it is not known for sure. A royal decree from 7 February 1855 approved the construction of a new church in Hallingby. The church was designed by Christian Heinrich Grosch and it was to be an octagonal building in an Empire style. It has more or less the same design as the nearby Nes Church, Begnadalen Church, and Rogne Church. The new church was consecrated on 1 October 1862.

== Media gallery ==

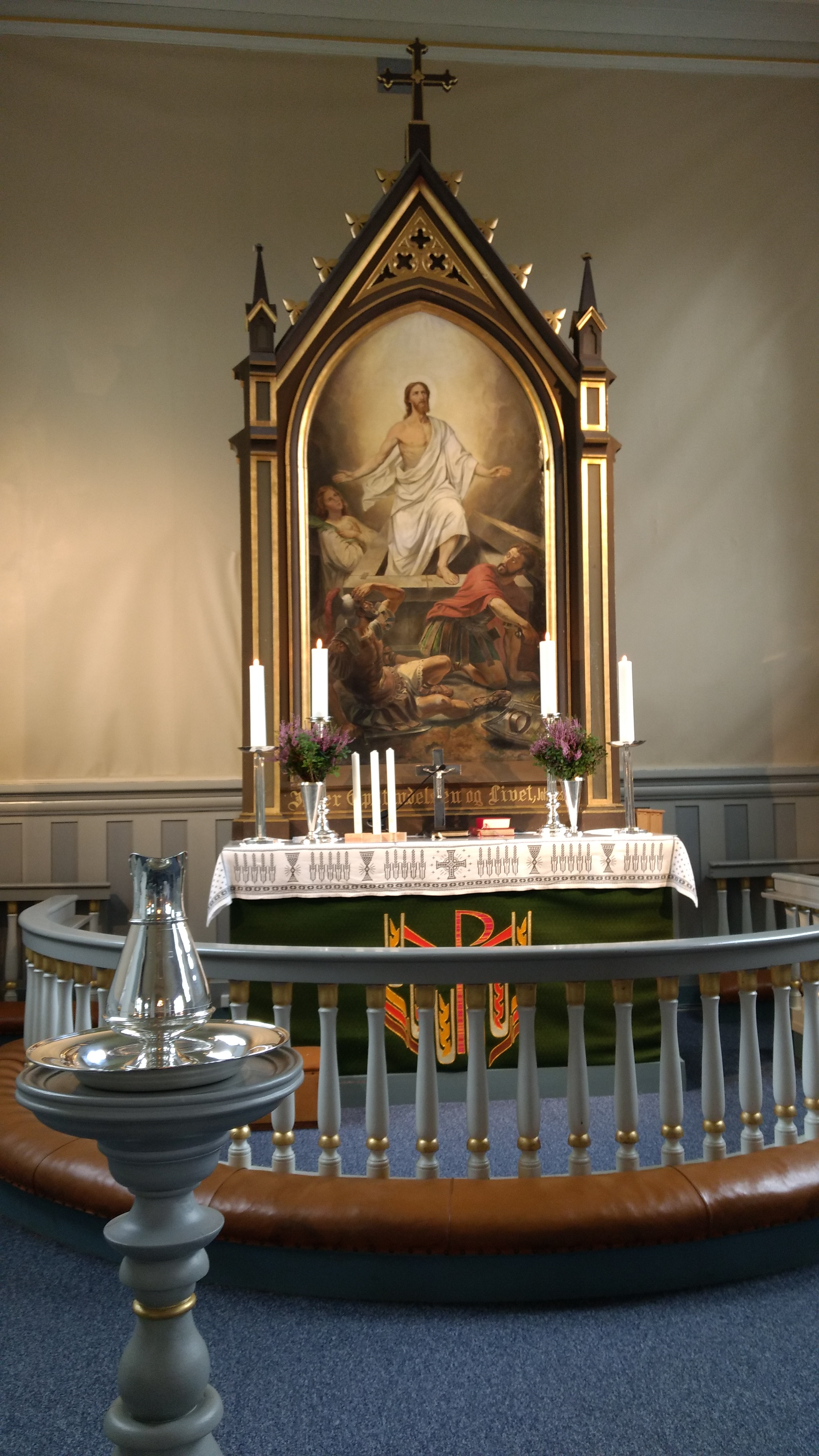

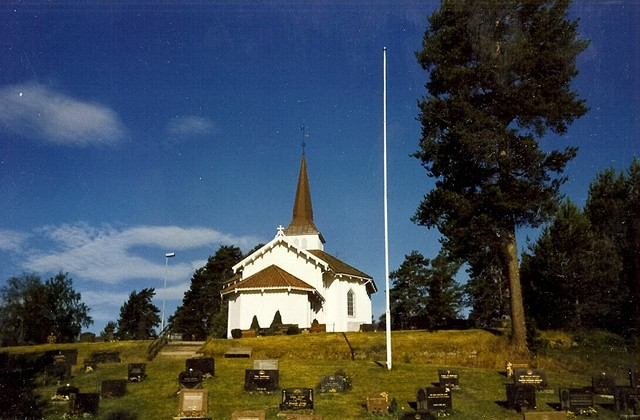

== See also ==
- List of churches in Tunsberg
