= Begna (river) =

River in Innlandet, Norway

Begna Historic spellings: Bægna / Bejna / Bejnaelven
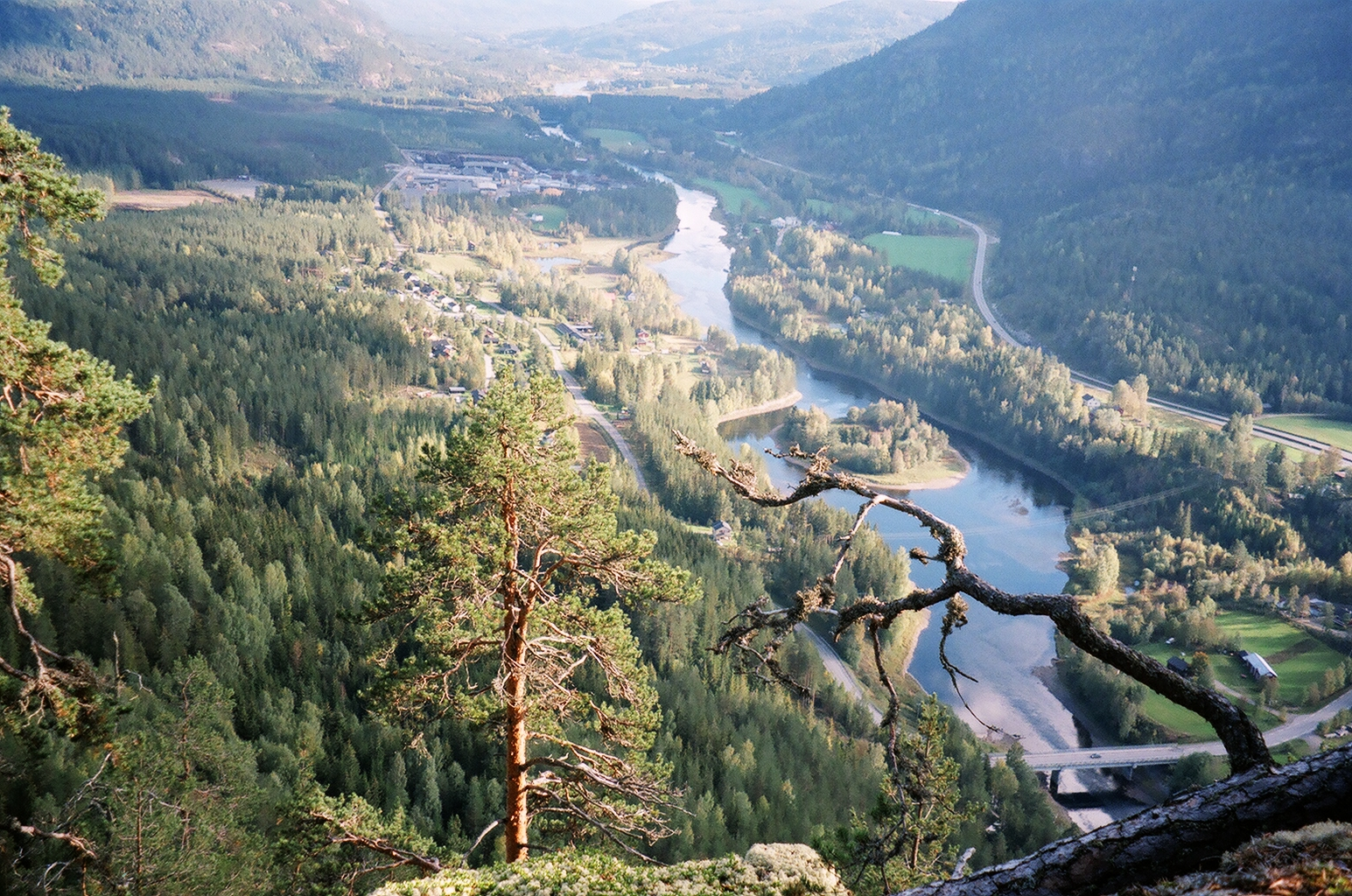
- View of the river

Location
- Country: Norway
- County: Innlandet, Buskerud
- Municipalities: Vang; Vestre Slidre; Nord-Aurdal; Sør-Aurdal; Ringerike

Physical characteristics
- Source: Otrøvatnet
  - location: Tyinkrysset, Vang Municipality
  - coordinates: 61.1864°N 8.20936°E
  - elevation: 971 metres (3,186 ft)
- Mouth: Randselva river
  - location: Hønefoss, Ringerike Municipality
  - coordinates: 60.168830°N 10.263504°E
  - elevation: 65 metres (213 ft)
- Length: 213 km (132 mi)
- Basin size: 4,851 km^{2} (1,873 sq mi)
- Discharge
  - average: 88 m^{3}/s (3,100 cu ft/s)

The Begna is a river in Buskerud and Innlandet counties in Norway. The 213-kilometre (132 mi) long river runs from the Filefjell mountain area through Valdres to the town of Hønefoss where it joins the river Randselva before it empties into the Tyrifjorden. The river Begna drains a watershed of 4,875 square kilometres (1,882 mi^{2}) and this is the primary river in the watershed. Along its course, the river passes through the village of Begna in Sør-Aurdal Municipality. The Norwegian writer, Mikkjel Fønhus lived much of his life and located most of his novels along the river Begna.

== Course ==
The headwaters of the river is found in the Filefjell mountain plateau on the south side of the Jotunheimen mountains. Among the highest points of the headwaters are the lake Steinurdalstjern which sits at an elevation of 1,429 metres (4,688 ft) above sea level. Many of the mountain streams that feed into the river flow into the lake Otrøvatnet. The main outflow of the lake is where the river Begna begins. This part is also known as the Otrøelva river, and a short distance downstream the river Ylja joins it and after this confluence, the river is known as the Begna. The river continues eastwards and southwards along its course.

There are several places along the river which have been dammed and these have formed a number of large lakes including Vangsmjøse, Slidrefjorden, Strondafjorden, and Aurdalsfjorden. The valley through which the river flows is called the Begnadalen valley. After passing through the village of Begna, the river enters into Buskerud county. After passing the village of Nes, the river enters the large lake Sperillen in the Ådal valley. From the lake Sperillen to the town of Hønefoss, the river is also known as the Ådalselva. At Hønefoss, the river cascades down a 21.5-metre (71 ft) tall waterfall known as Hønefossen. The river Begna joins the Randselva river in Hønefoss before discharging into the large lake Tyrifjorden.

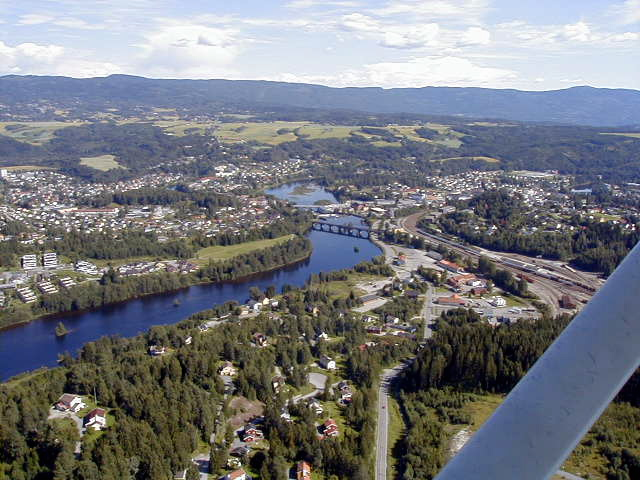
Begna in Hønefoss

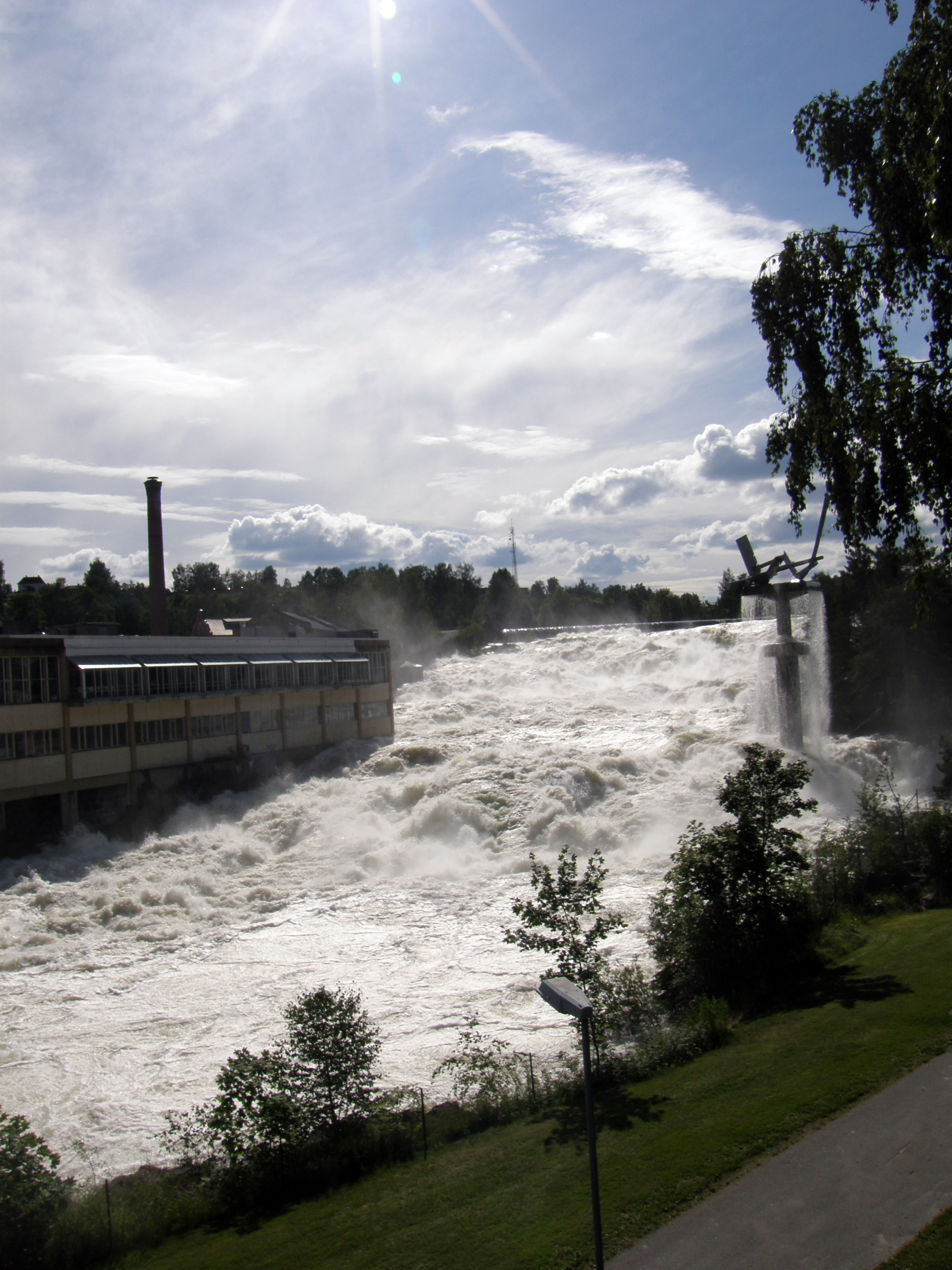
Honefossen in Hønefoss

== Power generation ==
In the past, the river Begna was a significant log driving river. Over the years the river has been developed for hydroelectric power with a maximum output of approximately 326 megawatts (437,000 hp) (as of 2003) including on its tributaries. The largest power stations are Åbjøra in Nord-Aurdal Municipality which produces 93 megawatts (125,000 hp) and Bagn in Sør-Aurdal Municipality which produces 76 megawatts (102,000 hp). The Association for Begna Watershed Control (Foreningen til Bægnavassdragets Regulering) is an association that was created under the provisions of the Norwegian Watercourse Act. Its purpose is to protect members' common interests with regard to the use of water from the Begna river basin that is used for power generation. The hydropower company operates 20 power plants on the Begna (and the river Drammenselva which flows from the lake Tyrifjorden to the sea. The association is responsible for maintenance and operation of dams, gates, and stations along the Begna waterway. The plants are mainly located in Valdres in the upper part of the river.

== See also ==
- List of rivers in Norway
