= Hen, Buskerud =

Village in Ringerike Municipality, Norway

Coordinates: 60°13′N 10°14′E

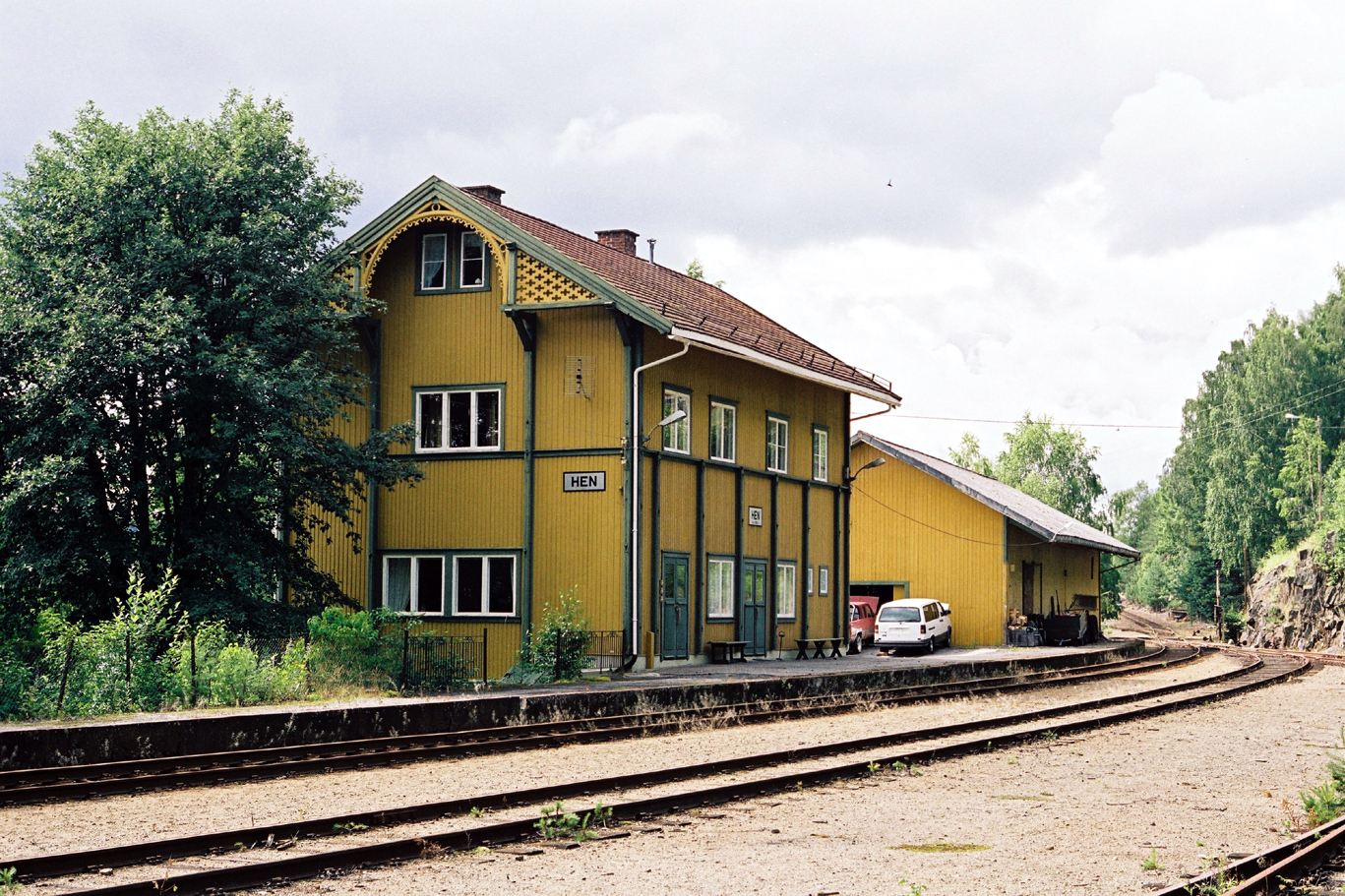
Hen Station

Hen is a small village in the municipality of Ringerike in Buskerud, Norway.

Hen is situated between Hønefoss and Hallingby in Ådal. Hen is located near the Hensfossen waterfall on the Ådal River (Ådalselva). Timber was floating down the Ådal River, which in the past had both a sawmill and pulp mill, both of which are now closed. Hensfoss kraftverk is a hydroelectric power plant powered by the water fall from Hensfossen. The power plant was put into operation in 1946 and modified in 1950 and 1951.

Hen Station (Hen Stasjon) on the Randsfjorden Line was opened in 1868. Sperill Line (Sperillbanen) was opened for traffic from Hen to Finsand at Lake Sperillen in 1926. In 1933, it was decided to close the passenger traffic on Sperillbanen followed by the end of freight traffic in 1957. Passenger traffic on Randsfjorden Line was discontinued in 1968, which led to the Hen Station being downgraded to catering for dispatching trains and freight.

The population of Hen in 2003 was 234, but since 2004 it is no longer considered an urban area by Statistics Norway, and its data is therefore not registered.
