= The Stugunøset in the Filefjeld =

Painting by Johan Christian Dahl

- Stugunøset på Filefjeld (Norwegian)
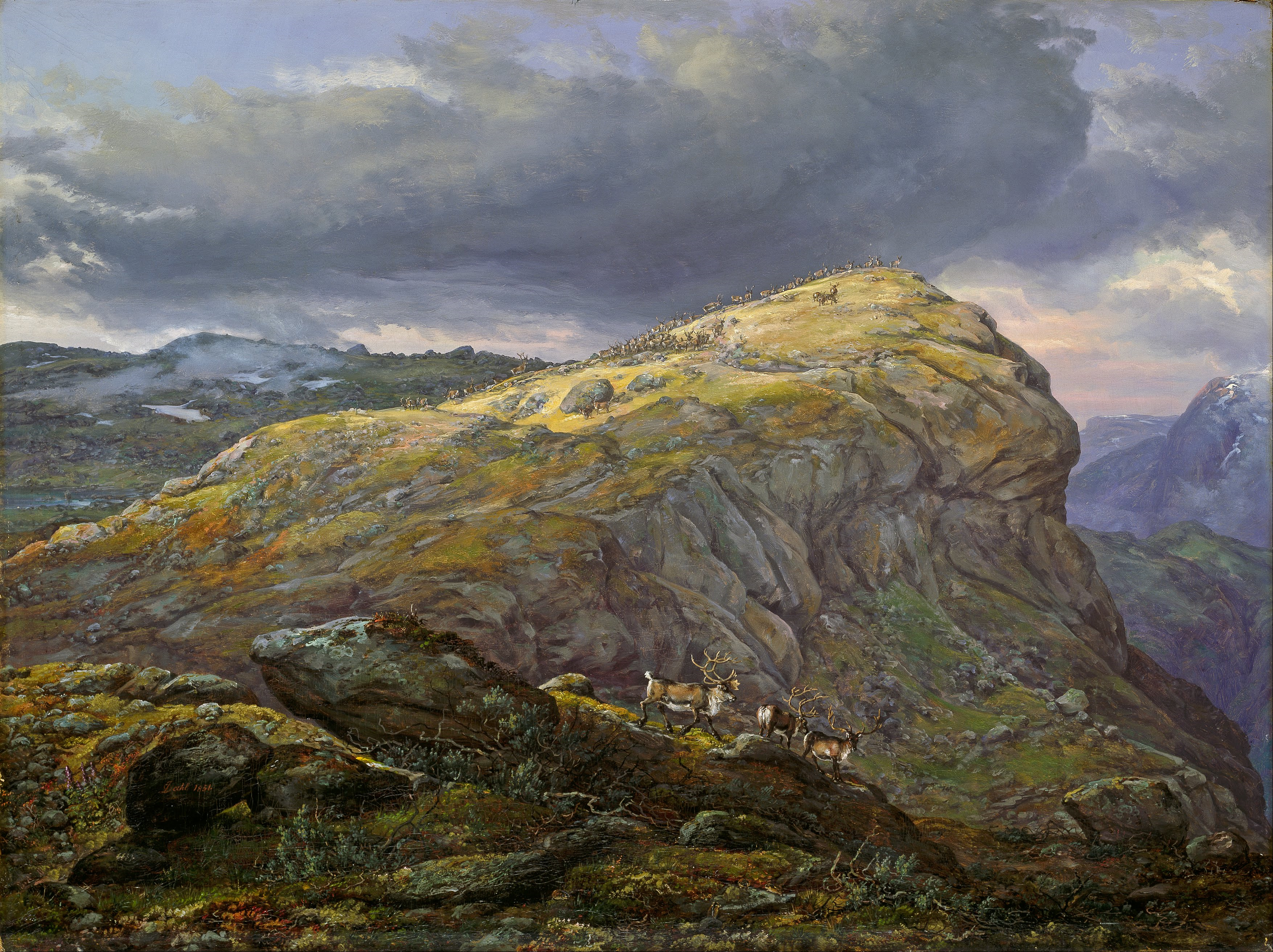
- Artist: Johan Christian Dahl
- Year: 1851
- Medium: oil on canvas
- Dimensions: 67 cm × 89 cm (26 in × 35 in)
- Location: National Gallery, Oslo

The Stugunøset in the Filefjeld (Norwegian - Stugunøset på Filefjeld, Stugunøset på Fillefjell or Stugunøset på Filefjell) is an oil on canvas painting by the Norwegian artist Johan Christian Dahl, from 1851. It is held in the National Gallery, in Oslo.

== History and description ==
The painting depicts the mountain Støgonøse (1433 meters height) on Filefjell in the Valdres district. The mountain is located in Oppland. Dahl based the painting on a sketch that he had made after his last trip to Valdres in 1850, showing the high mountain ridge north of Otrøvatnet. The top of the mountain shows a herd of wild reindeers. Three reindeers are also visible in the foreground.

The artist was 62 at the time but still was able to climb to the site with great difficulty. Several people had to be brought from the valley to help carry him back down.

In 1852, the painting was sold to the Christiania Art Society, which sold it the following year to Wilhelm Adelsten Maribo, who left it to its current owner in 1901.

The painting was the motif for one of the postal stamps in the series dedicated to "Norwegian Painting" in 1976.

== Sources ==
- https://artsandculture.google.com/asset/stugun%C3%B8set-at-filefjell/IwH09jau3mEorg
