= Nes Church (Buskerud) =

Church in Buskerud, Norway

- Nes kirke
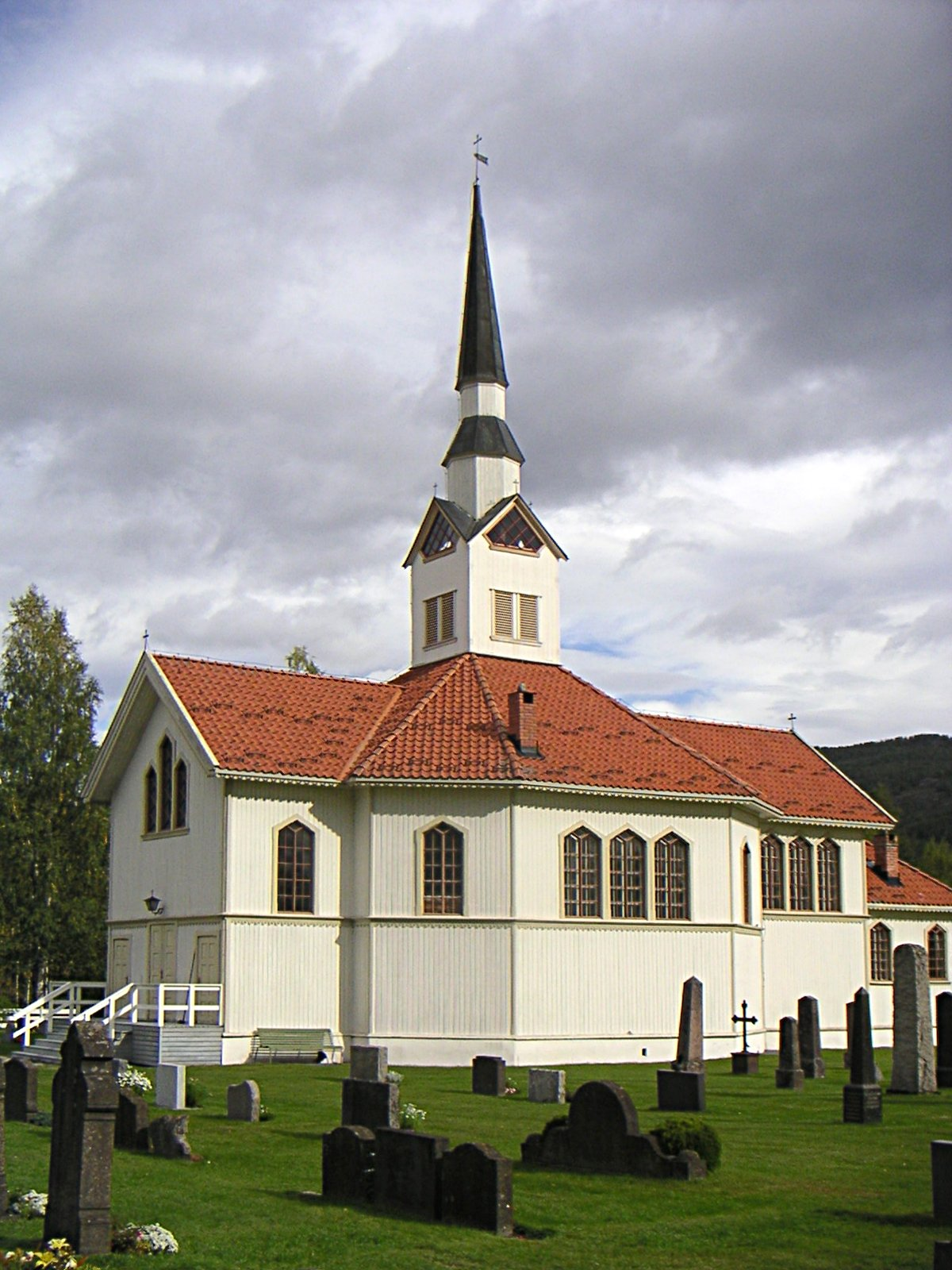
- View of the church
- Nes Church
- 60°33′50″N 9°59′08″E
- Location: Ringerike, Buskerud
- Country: Norway
- Denomination: Church of Norway
- Churchmanship: Evangelical Lutheran

History
- Status: Parish church
- Founded: 1860
- Consecrated: 22 Aug 1860

Architecture
- Functional status: Active
- Architect: Christian Grosch
- Architectural type: Octagonal
- Completed: 1860 (166 years ago)

Specifications
- Capacity: 250
- Materials: Wood

Administration
- Diocese: Tunsberg
- Deanery: Ringerike prosti
- Parish: Nes
- Norwegian Cultural Heritage Site
- Type: Church
- Status: Listed
- ID: 85103

Nes Church (Norwegian: Nes kirke) is a parish church of the Church of Norway in Ringerike Municipality in Buskerud county, Norway. It is located in the village of Nes. It is the church for the Nes parish which is part of the Ringerike prosti (deanery) in the Diocese of Tunsberg. The white, wooden church was built in an octagonal design in 1860 using plans drawn up by the architect Christian Heinrich Grosch. The church seats about 250 people.

== History ==
In 1854, the new Ådal prestegjeld was created and permission was given to build a new church in Nes in Ådal. The new church would be an annex chapel to the main Viker Church. The parish chose Christian Grosch's architectural drawings for Rogne Church in Øystre Slidre Municipality to use for the new church. It was built during 1858-1860 and the new building was consecrated on 22 August 1860. The church is a log building in the shape of an octagon in the Empire style. East of the octagonal part is a rectangular choir with a small sacristy.

== Media gallery ==
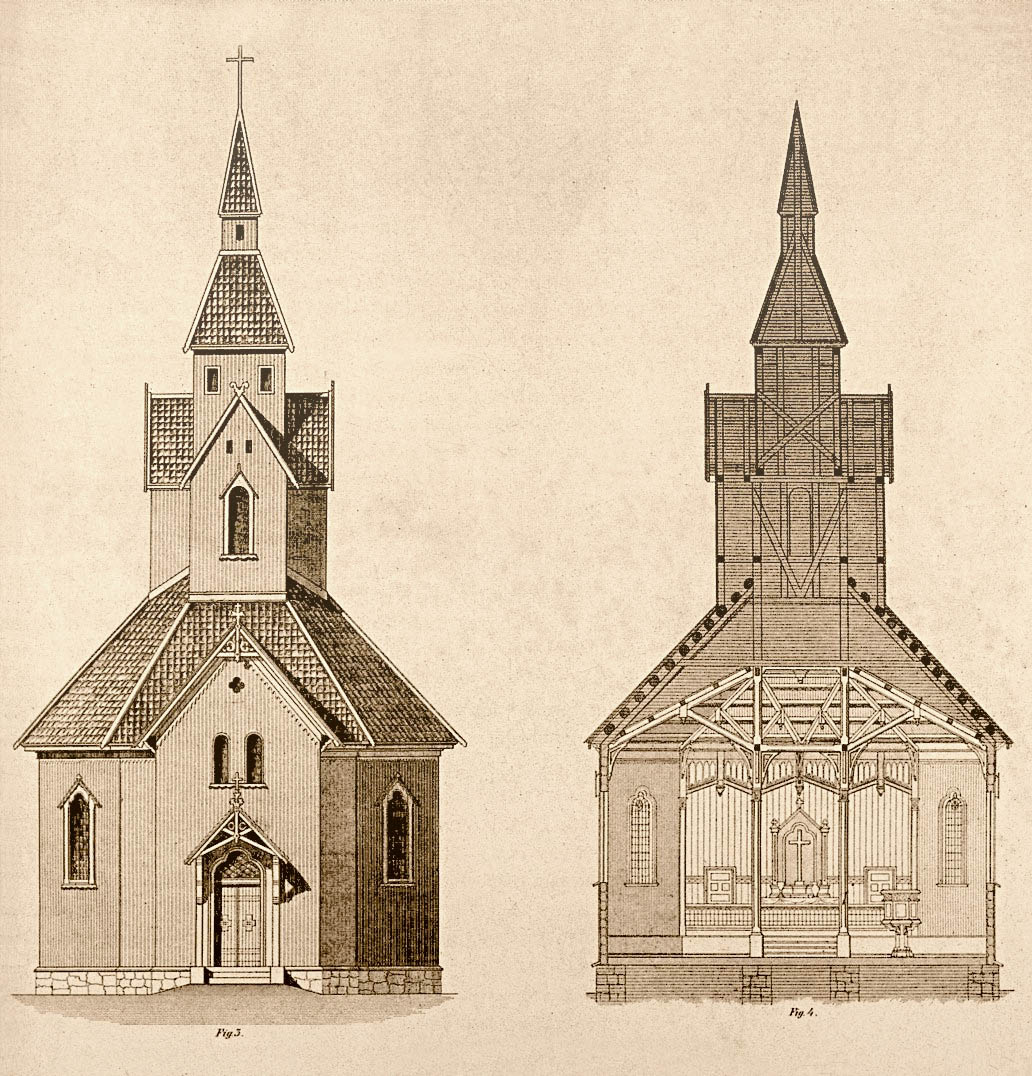

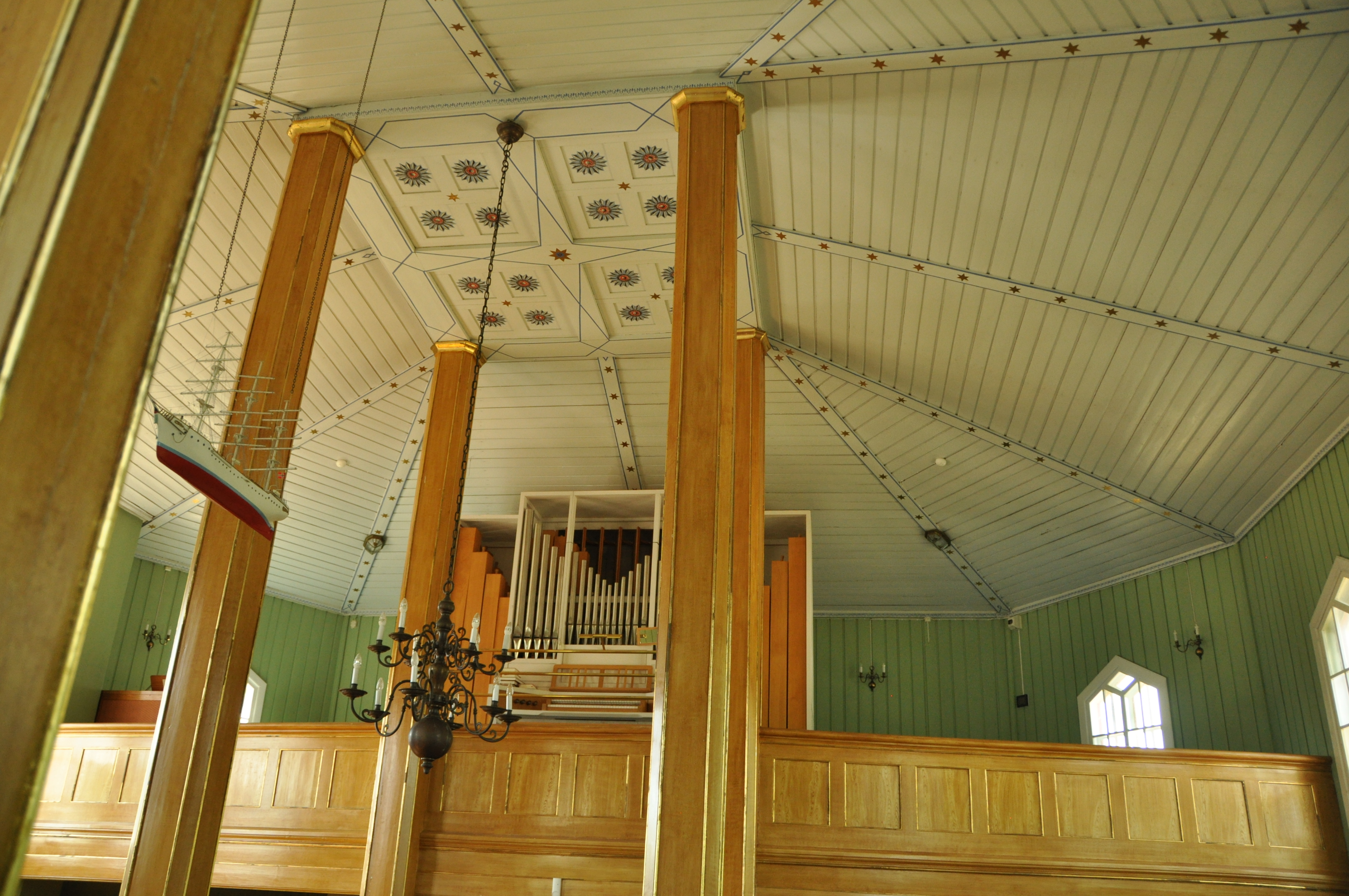

== See also ==
- List of churches in Tunsberg
