= Ådal Municipality =

Former municipality in Norway

Coordinates: 60°27′55.23″N 10°2′9.64″E

Ådal is a valley in the municipality of Ringerike and was a former municipality in Buskerud County, Norway.

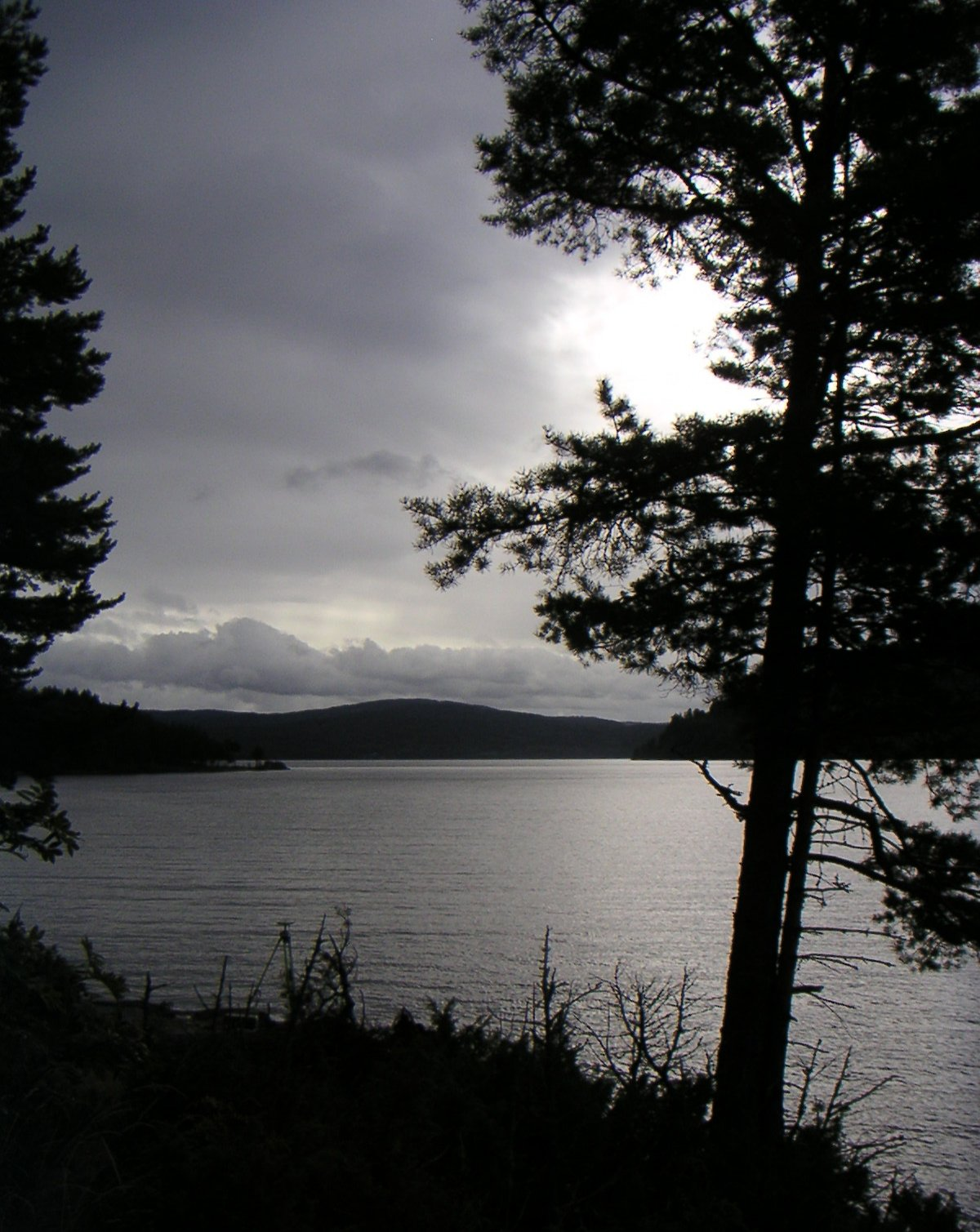
Sperillen at Ådal

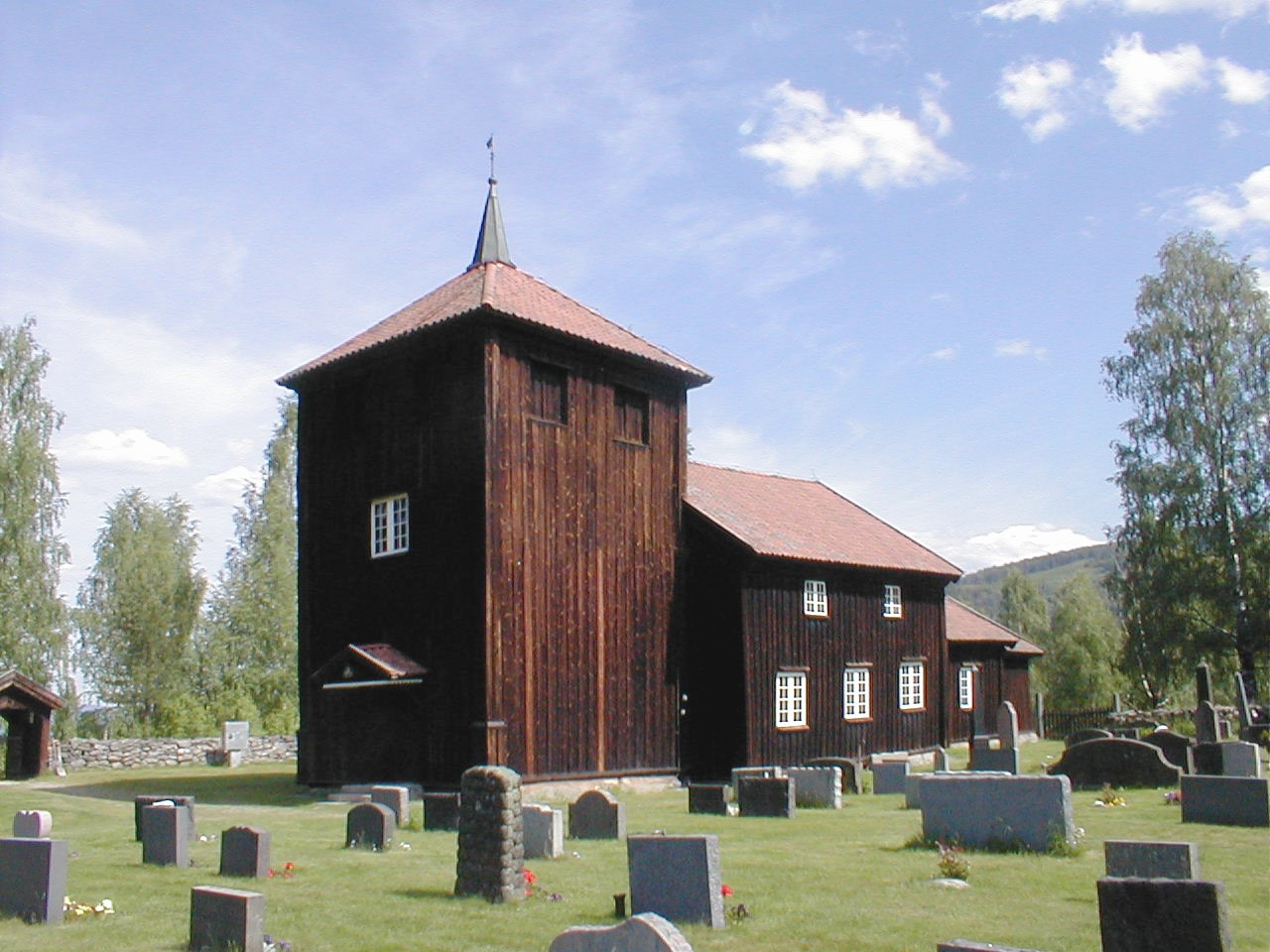
Viker Church

The municipality was created in 1857 by a split from Norderhov Municipality. At that time Ådal had a population of 2,382. On 1 January 1964 Ådal was merged with Hønefoss, Tyristrand, Hole, and Norderhov to form the new Ringerike Municipality. Prior to the merger Ådal had a population of 3,442.

Traditionally the Ådal parish has been divided three ways. Ytre Ådal includes the village of Hallingby and is the site of Hallingby school and Hval Church (Hval kirke). Øvre Ådal includes the village of Nes, Ådal and is the site of Nes school, Ringmoen school and Nes Church (Nes kirke). Vestre Ådal is the site of Viker Church and the Ådal Mountains (Ådalsfjellene), a small mountain range which stretches from Ådal to Vassfarfoten on the edge of the Vassfaret valley in Sør-Aurdal Municipality in Innlandet county.

== Sperillen ==
Sperillen, the 33rd largest lake in Norway, is located in Ådal. The rivers Begna (from Begnadalen) and Urula (from Hedalen) flow into the lake from the north. At the south end of the lake, there is a dam located near Ringmoen. The lake is well known for its fisheries and is one of the few within Norway with a commercial fishery.

== Viker Church ==
The first church located at Ådal was a Stave church built during the 15th century. It is mentioned in Diplomatarium Norvegicum in 1462. Before the 17th century it was related to Hole and then connected after the Protestant Reformation to Norderhov parish. By 1700 Ådal needed a new church to serve the growing needs of its parish.

Viker Church (Norwegian: Viker Kirke) is located on the west shore of Sperillen Lake. The church dates to 1702. The pulpit, altar and crucifers from the old Stave church were saved and placed in the new church. The church has an open interior ceilings and wood walls that are oiled. The wooden exterior is dark brown. The altarpiece is from 1720s. The baptismal font is from 1728 and has an octagon top and bottom. The church tower has two bells, dating to 1721 and 1842. Because it is situated in the middle of a forested area, it is difficult to see Viker Church from a distance.

== The name ==
The Old Norse name of the district was Árdalr. The first element is the genitive case of á for 'river', the last element is dalr meaning 'dale or valley'.
