= Otrøelva =

River in Innlandet, Norway

Coordinates: 61°11′23″N 8°13′07″E

The Otrøelva river is a small river in Innlandet, Norway, that originates from headwaters in the Filefjell mountains to Lake Vangsmjøse. It is a part of the Begna river watershed, joining the Begna above Lake Vangsmjøse.
