= Sperillen Line =

Abandoned railway line in Buskerud, Norway

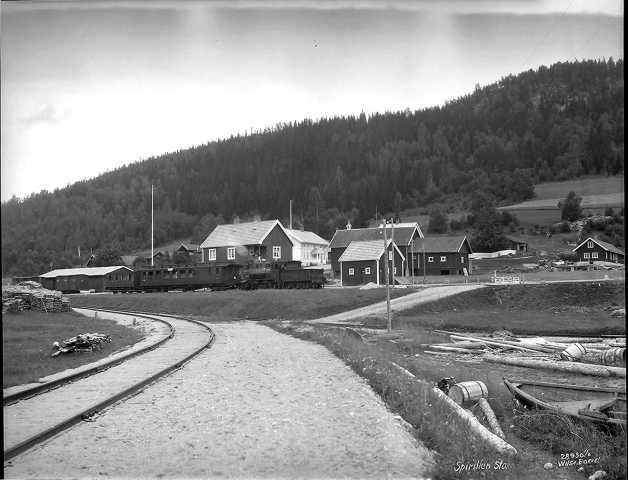
- Finsand 1926

Overview
- Native name: Sperillbanen
- Status: Abandoned
- Owner: Norwegian State Railways
- Termini: Hen Station; Sperillen
- Stations: 5

Service
- Type: Railway
- System: Norwegian railways
- Operator(s): Norwegian State Railways

History
- Closed: 1932

Technical
- Line length: 23.91 kilometres (15 mi)
- Number of tracks: Single
- Character: Passenger and freight
- Track gauge: 1,435 mm (4 ft 8 1/2 in)
- Electrification: No
- Highest elevation: 191.0 m asl

The Sperillen Line (Norwegian: Sperillbanen) is an abandoned railway which ran through Ringerike in Buskerud county, Norway.

The 24 kilometers (15 mi) long line had five stations, starting at Hen Station on the Randsfjord Line and continuing to Lake Sperillen where it connected with a ferry at the port of Finstad. The rail line had additional stations and stops at Hallingby, Somma, and Ringmoen at the south end of Lake Sperillen.

The steam ship DS Bægna had provided ferry and freight transport service from the southern end of Lake Sperillen to Sørum at Sør-Aurdal Municipality in Oppland at the northern end. Bægna went in service from her maiden voyage on 13 October 1868 and continued in traffic until 1929, when it was replaced with a motor ship, DS Spirillen. In 1921, Parliament voted to build a railway between the Randsfjord Line and a new port at Finsand on Lake Sperillen to connected for the ferry service. In 1933, passenger service on the rail line was terminated, as was the ferry traffic on Lake Spirillen. Freight trains on the rail line were terminated in 1957.
