= Hallingby =

Village in Buskerud, Norway

Coordinates: 60°16′N 10°12′E

Hallingby is a village in Ringerike municipality in the county of Buskerud, Norway.

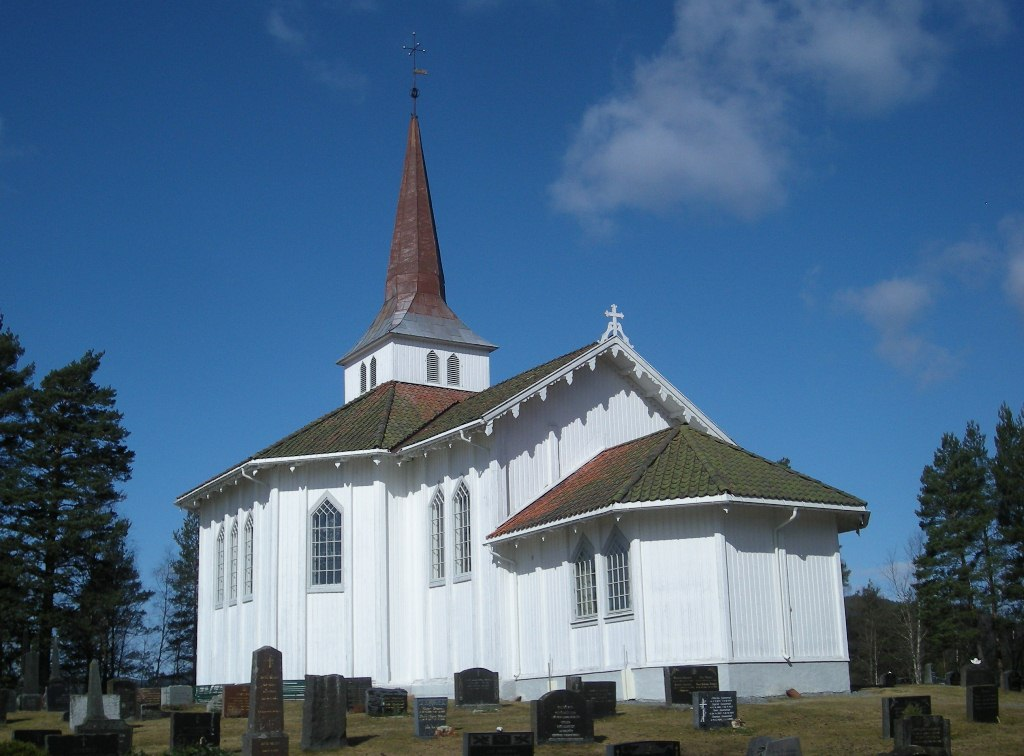
Hval Church in Hallingby

Hallingby is located north of Hønefoss, along the European route E16 towards Valdres and Western Norway. Hallingby was one of five stations on the now defunct Sperillbanen, an abandoned railway which ran through Ringerike between the village of Hen and the port at Finstad on Lake Sperillen.

Hval Church (Hval kirke), an octagonal church built in 1862, is the main church in the parish. The church is an octagonal central nave church of timber from 1862 and has 250 seats. The church was built from the same drawings originally designed by architect Christian Heinrich Grosch for the Nes Church. The church was restored during 1902, 1924, and 1962. In 1924, a new chapel in the timber was built and inaugurated in 1925. The altarpiece is a copy of The Resurrection painted by Adolph Tidemand from 1871, the original of which is in Bragernes Church in Drammen. The church has two bells, both cast by J. Warner & Sons in London, respectively in 1857 and 1861. The organ was built by Filthvett orgelbyggeri in Oslo in 1882.
