= Viker Church =

Church in Buskerud, Norway

- Viker kirke
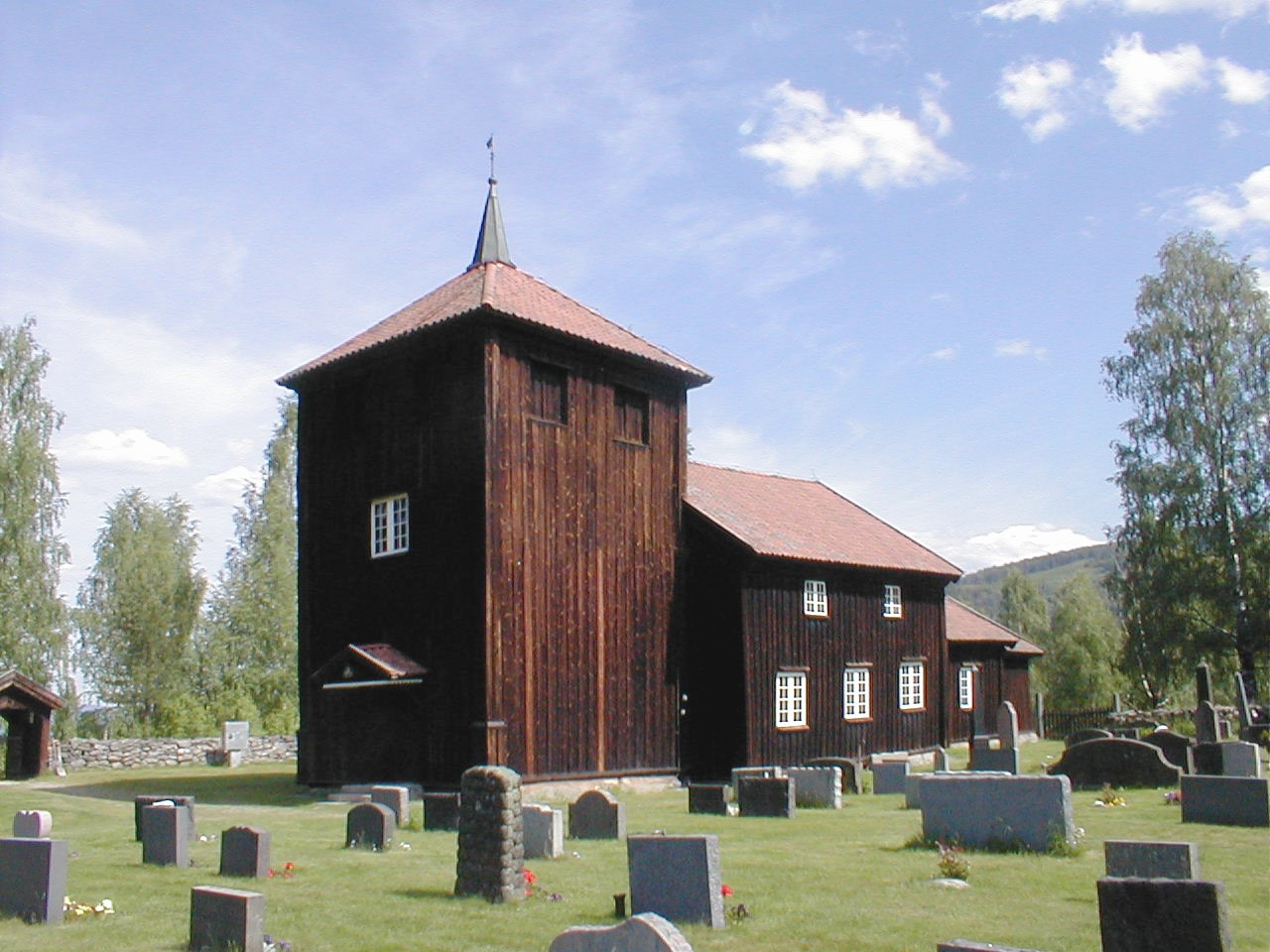
- View of the church
- Viker Church
- 60°26′58″N 10°02′24″E
- Location: Ringerike, Buskerud
- Country: Norway
- Denomination: Church of Norway
- Previous denomination: Catholic Church
- Churchmanship: Evangelical Lutheran

History
- Status: Parish church
- Founded: 13th century
- Consecrated: 1697

Architecture
- Functional status: Active
- Architectural type: Long church
- Completed: 1697 (329 years ago)

Specifications
- Capacity: 250
- Materials: Wood

Administration
- Diocese: Tunsberg
- Deanery: Ringerike prosti
- Parish: Viker
- Norwegian Cultural Heritage Site
- Type: Church
- Status: Automatically protected
- ID: 85842

Viker Church (Norwegian: Viker kirke) is a parish church of the Church of Norway in Ringerike Municipality in Buskerud county, Norway. It is located in the village of Viker. It is the church for the Viker parish which is part of the Ringerike prosti (deanery) in the Diocese of Tunsberg. The brown, wooden church was built in a long church design in 1697 using plans drawn up by an unknown architect. The church seats about 250 people.

== History ==
The earliest existing historical records of the church date back to the year 1462, but the church was not built that year. The first church was likely a small wooden stave church that was probably built in the 13th century. It seems that the church eventually became too small for the congregation and planning for a new church began in the 1690s. In 1702, the old church was torn down and replaced with a new long church that built using log construction. It has a large, but not tall, tower on the west end of the building. The church was repaired in 1825. The nave is rectangular, the choir is smaller and also rectangular. There is a sacristy extension from 1901 in the extension of the choir.

== See also ==
- List of churches in Tunsberg
