= Otrøvatnet =

Lake in Innlandet, Norway

Otrøvatnet Støgovatnet
- Otrøyvatnet
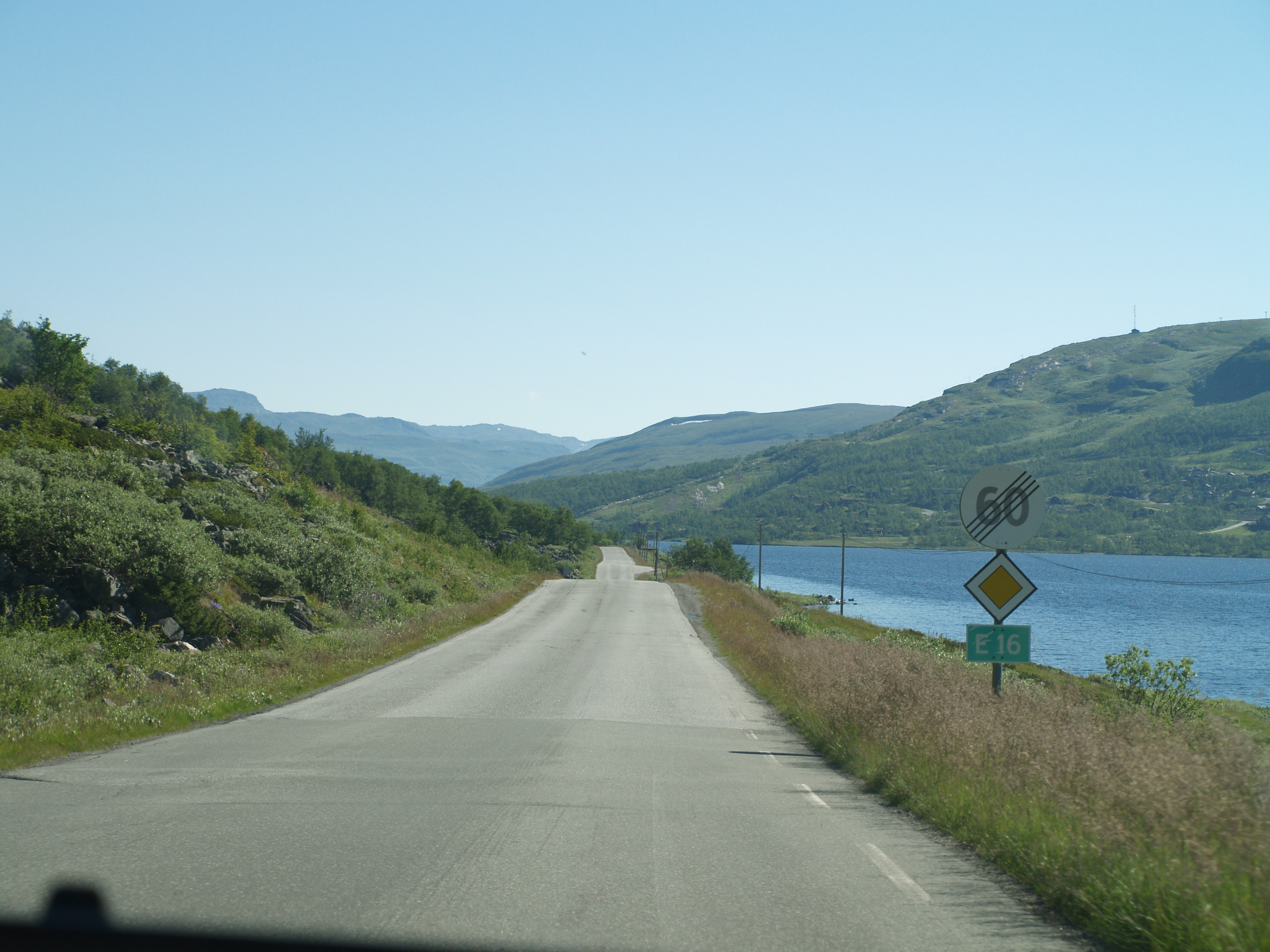
- The European route E16 mear Otrøvatnet
- Interactive map of the lake
- Location: Vang Municipality, Innlandet
- Coordinates: 61°10′52″N 8°11′24″E
- Basin countries: Norway
- Max. length: 3 kilometres (1.9 mi)
- Max. width: 1 kilometre (0.62 mi)
- Surface area: 2.19 km^{2} (0.85 sq mi)
- Max. depth: 56 metres (184 ft)
- Shore length^{1}: 8 kilometres (5.0 mi)
- Surface elevation: 971 metres (3,186 ft)
- References: NVE
- ^{1} Shore length is not a well-defined measure.

Otrøvatnet or Støgovatnet is a lake in Vang Municipality in Innlandet county, Norway. The 2-square-kilometre (0.77 sq mi) lake lies in the Filefjell area, about 2 kilometres (1.2 mi) to the southwest of the village of Tyinkrysset. The European route E16 highway passes through the 5-kilometre (3.1 mi) long Filefjell Tunnel in the mountain just north of the lake.

== See also ==
- List of lakes in Norway
