= Sperillen =

Lake in Ringerike, Norway

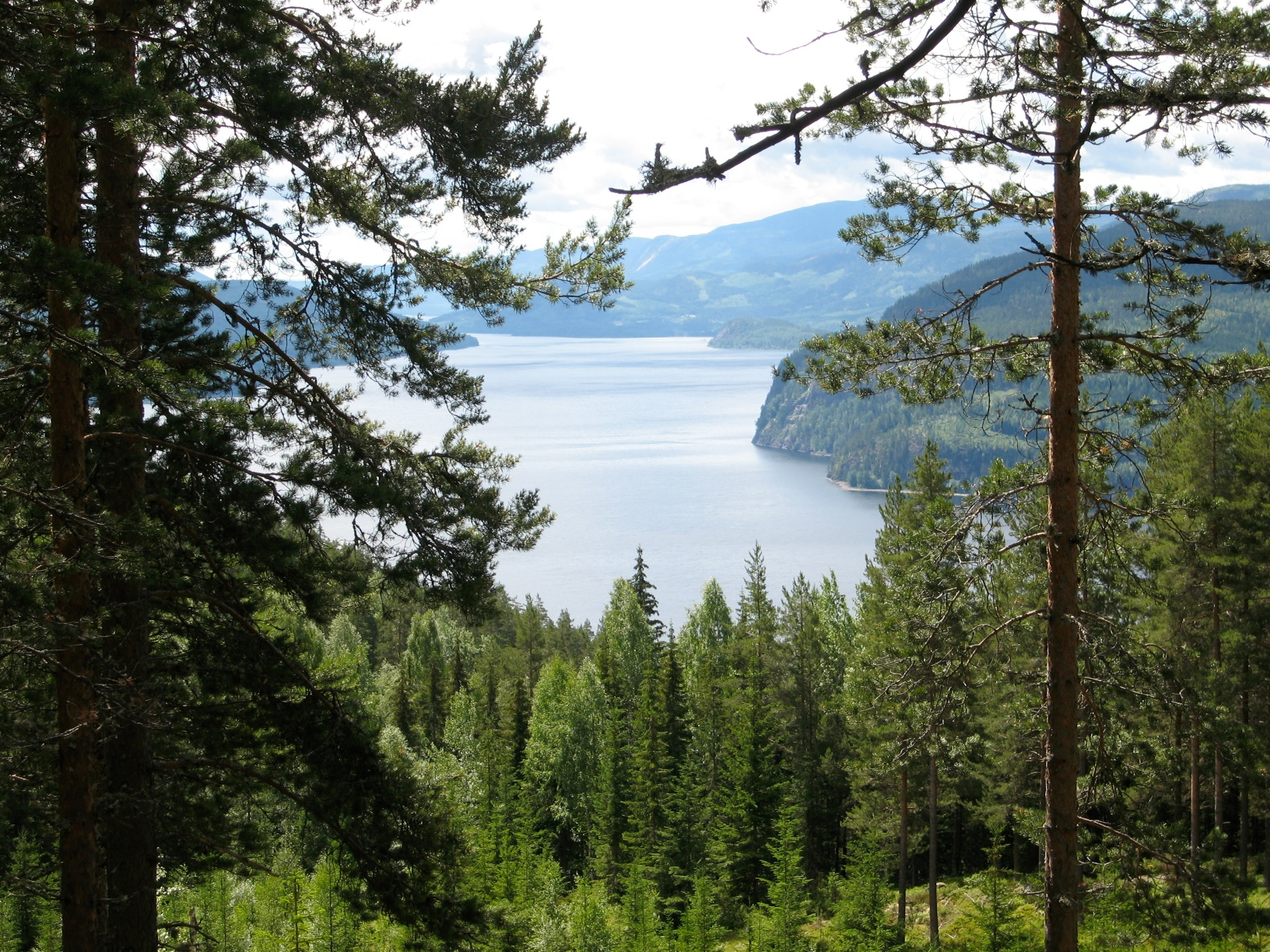
- View of Lake Sperillenin

- Location within Norway
- Location: Ringerike, Buskerud
- Coordinates: 60°28′N 10°03′E
- Type: glacier lake
- Primary inflows: Begna, Bjonelva, Rindeelva, Skarrudelva, Tosevikelva and Urula
- Primary outflows: Ådalselva
- Catchment area: 4,601.14 km^{2} (1,776.51 sq mi)
- Basin countries: Norway
- Max. length: 26 km (16 mi)
- Max. width: 2.5 km (1.6 mi)
- Surface area: 37.32 km^{2} (14.41 sq mi)
- Average depth: 44 m (144 ft)
- Max. depth: 129 m (423 ft)
- Water volume: 1.642 km^{3} (0.394 cu mi)
- Shore length^{1}: 68 km (42 mi)
- Surface elevation: 150 m (490 ft)
- ^{1} Shore length is not a well-defined measure.

Sperillen is a lake in the valley of Ådal in Ringerike municipality, Buskerud county, Norway.

The lake has an area of about 37 km² and extending about 26 km in length. It is 129 meters deep at its deepest, and lies at 150 meters above sea level. Two rivers from Oppland, Begna from the valley of Begnadalen and Urula from the valley of Hedalen, flow into the lake at the northern end on either side of the town of Nes in Ådal. At the southern end, Ådal river flows downstream from Sperillen. The outflow powers a hydro-electric power station at Ringmoen. European route E16 follows the east side of the lake.

The name Sperillen is derived from the Old Norse Sperðill which means "tail" and may refer to the elongated form of the lake. The lake is well known for its fisheries and is one of only a few in Norway with a commercial fishery. Common species are whitefish, char, European perch and trout, as well as crayfish.

From 1868 to 1929, transport along the lake was principally supplied by a small steamship, DS Bægna, which ran from the terminus of the Sperillen Line at Finsand on the southern end of the lake to Nes at the northern end. DS Bægna went in service in 1868 and continued in traffic until 1929, when it was replaced with a motor ship, DS Spirillen.

== Gallery ==
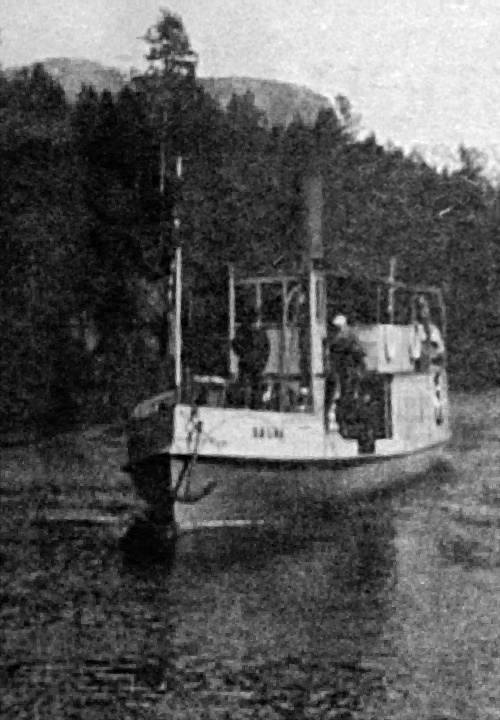
DS Bægna on Sperillen

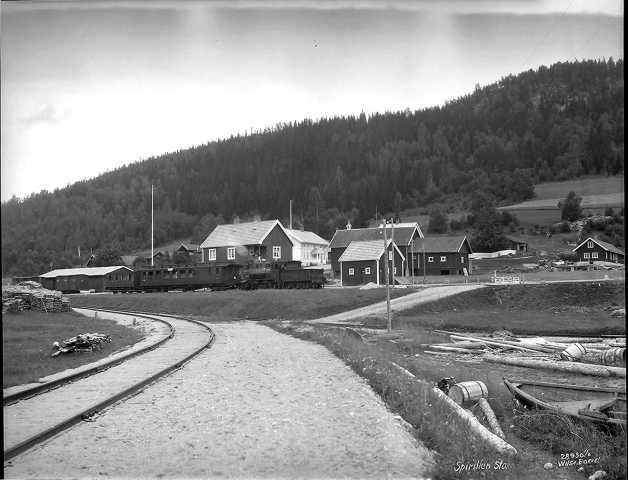
Finsand on Sperillen (1926)

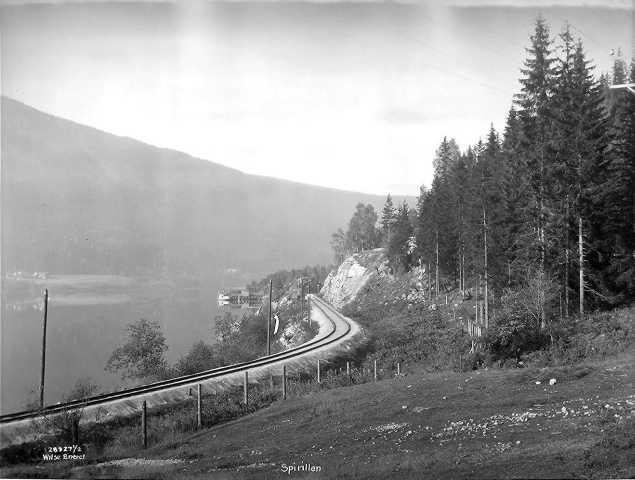
Sperillen Line (1926)

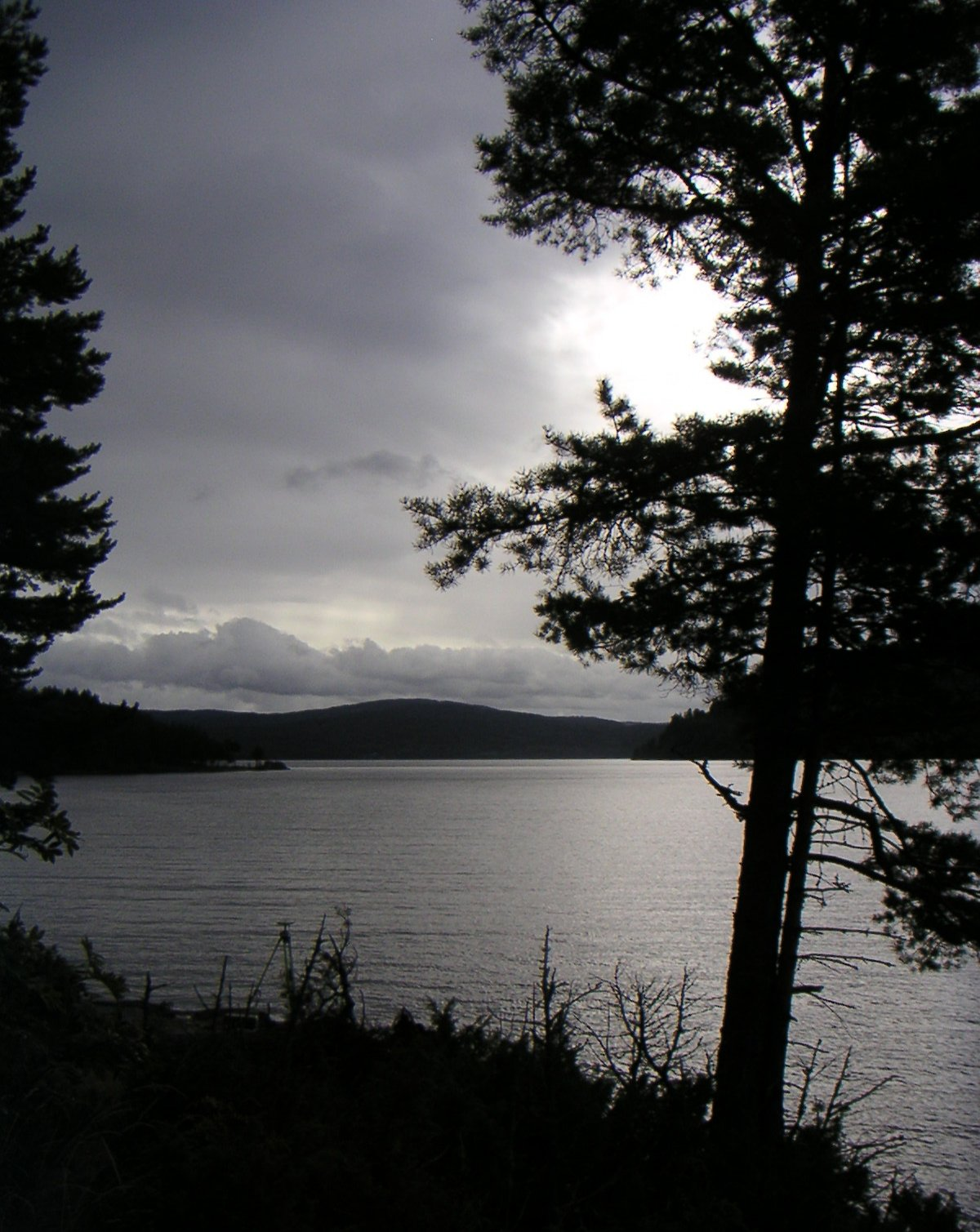
Sperillen at night
