= Nes, Ådal =

Village in Ringerike Municipality, Norway

Coordinates: 60°33′24″N 009°59′32″E

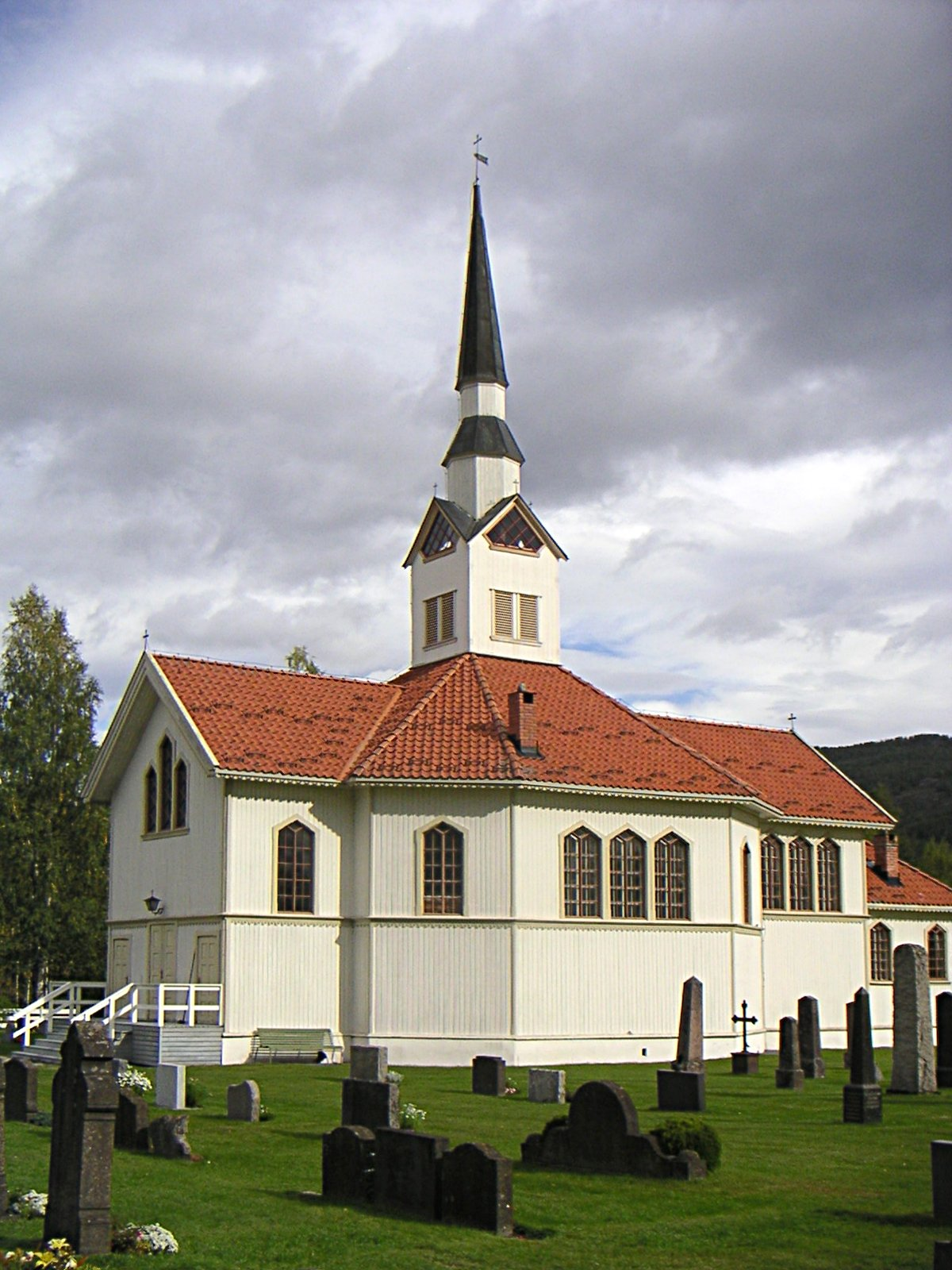
Nes Church, Nes i Ådal

Nes i Ådal is a small village in the valley of Ådal in the municipality Ringerike in Buskerud, Norway.

The name derives from the old farm Nes, which in medieval times was under the Diocese of Hamar.
