= Lomen =

Village in Vestre Slidre Municipality, Norway

Lomen Lome
- Village
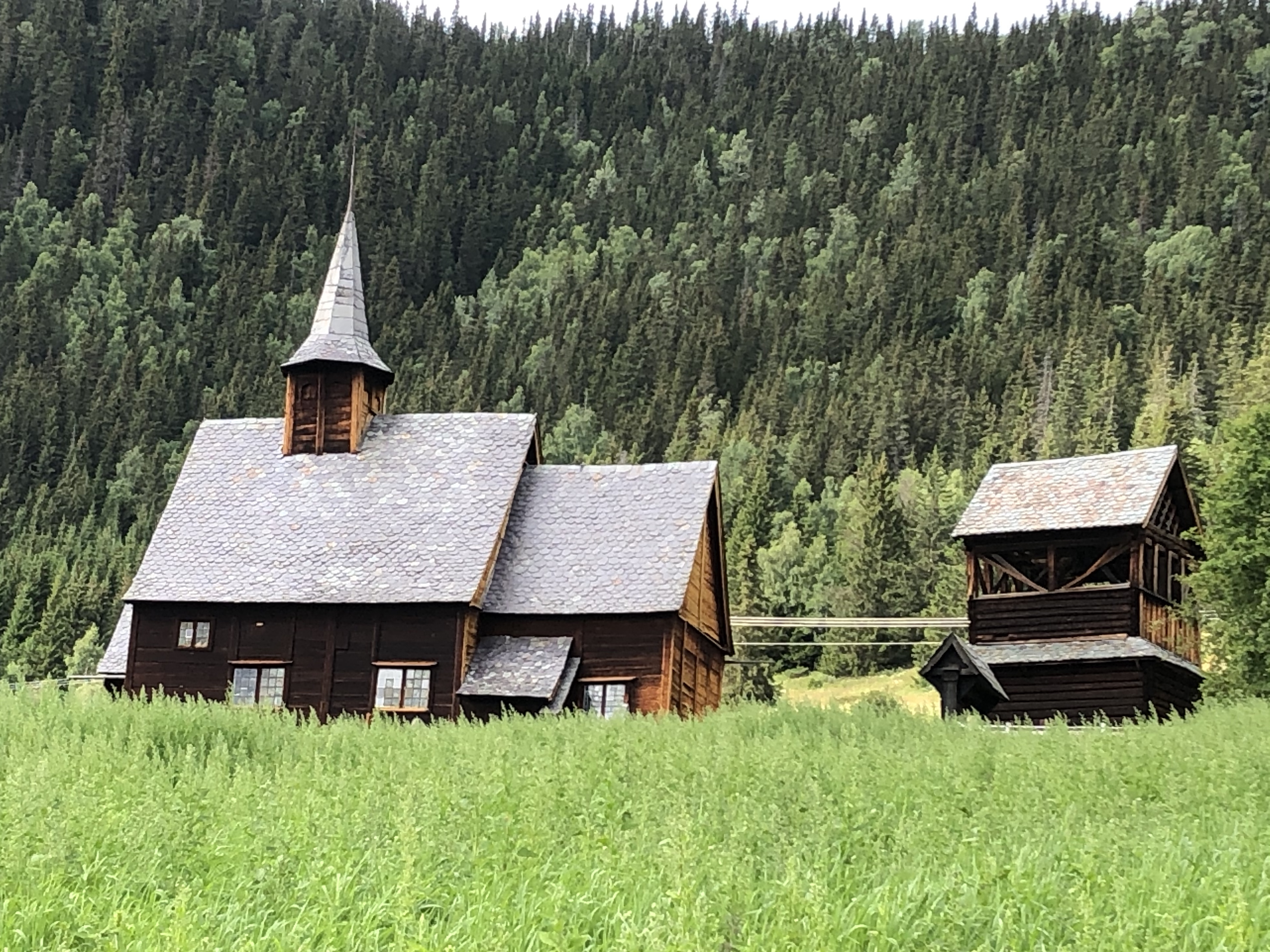
- View of the village church
- Interactive map of Lomen; Lome
- Location within Innlandet Location within Norway
- Coordinates: 61.13459°N 8.89193°E
- Country: Norway
- Region: Eastern Norway
- County: Innlandet
- District: Valdres
- Municipality: Vestre Slidre Municipality
- Elevation: 417 m (1,368 ft)
- Time zone: UTC+01:00 (CET)
  - Summer (DST): UTC+02:00 (CEST)
- Post Code: 2967 Lomen

Lomen or Lome is a village in Vestre Slidre Municipality in Innlandet county, Norway. The village is located at the north end of the Slidrefjorden, about 4 kilometres (2.5 mi) to the east of the village of Ryfoss and about 8 kilometres (5.0 mi) to the northwest of the village of Slidre. The historic Lomen Stave Church and the newer Lomen Church are both located in the village. The European route E16 highway runs through the village. The Lomen power plant is located on the west end of the village.

== Media gallery ==
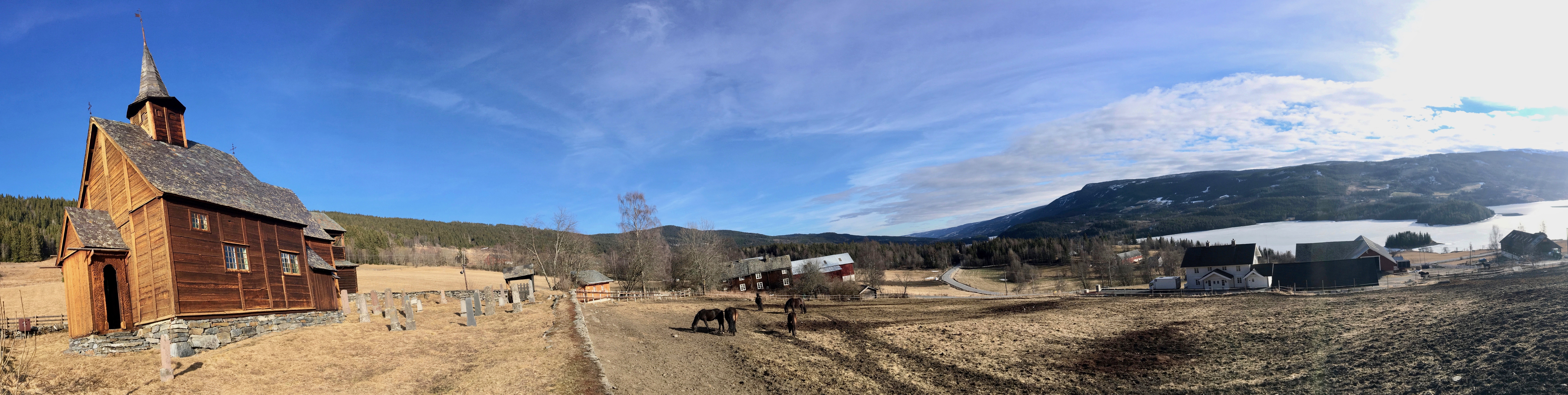
Panorama of Lomen

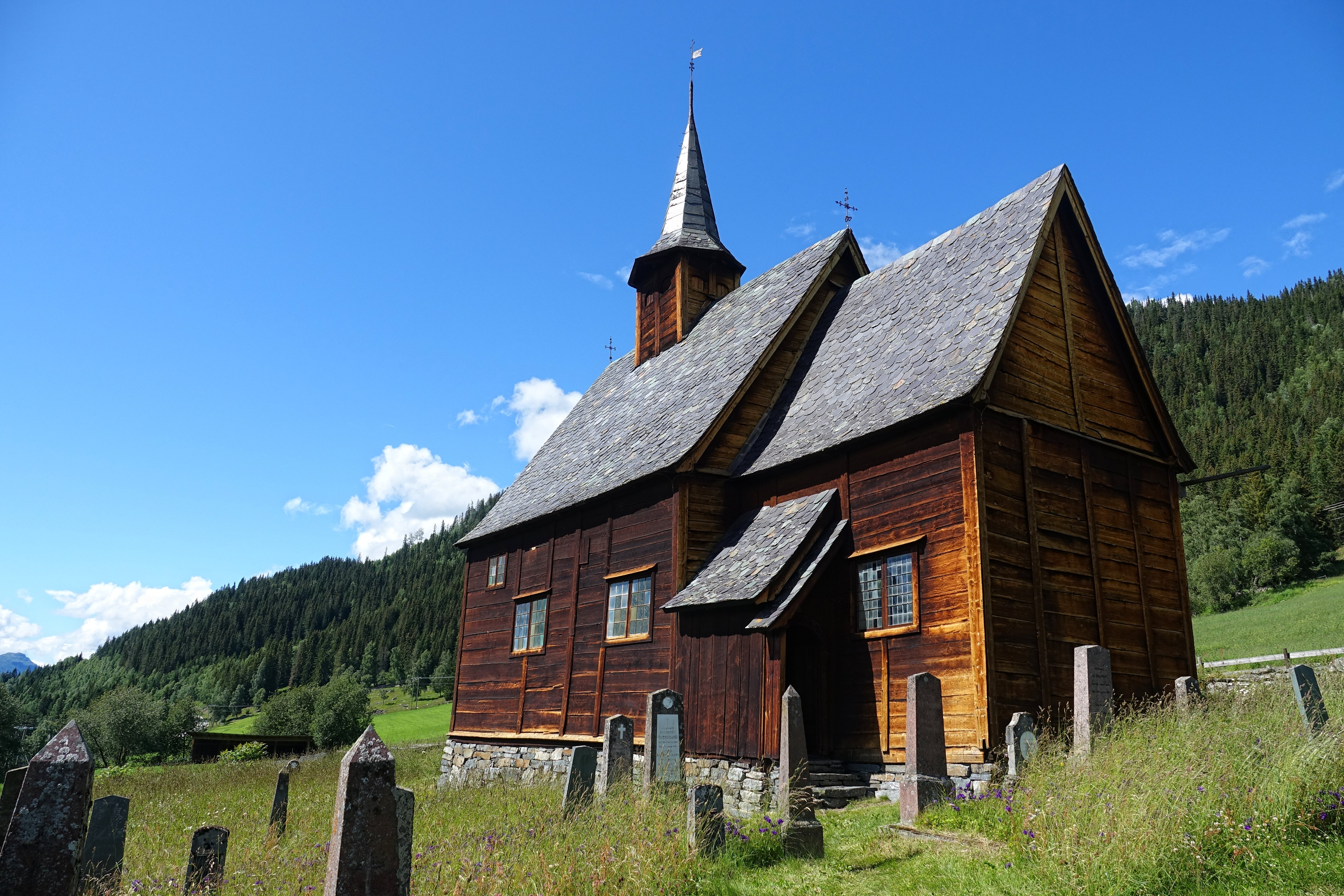
Lomen Stave Church

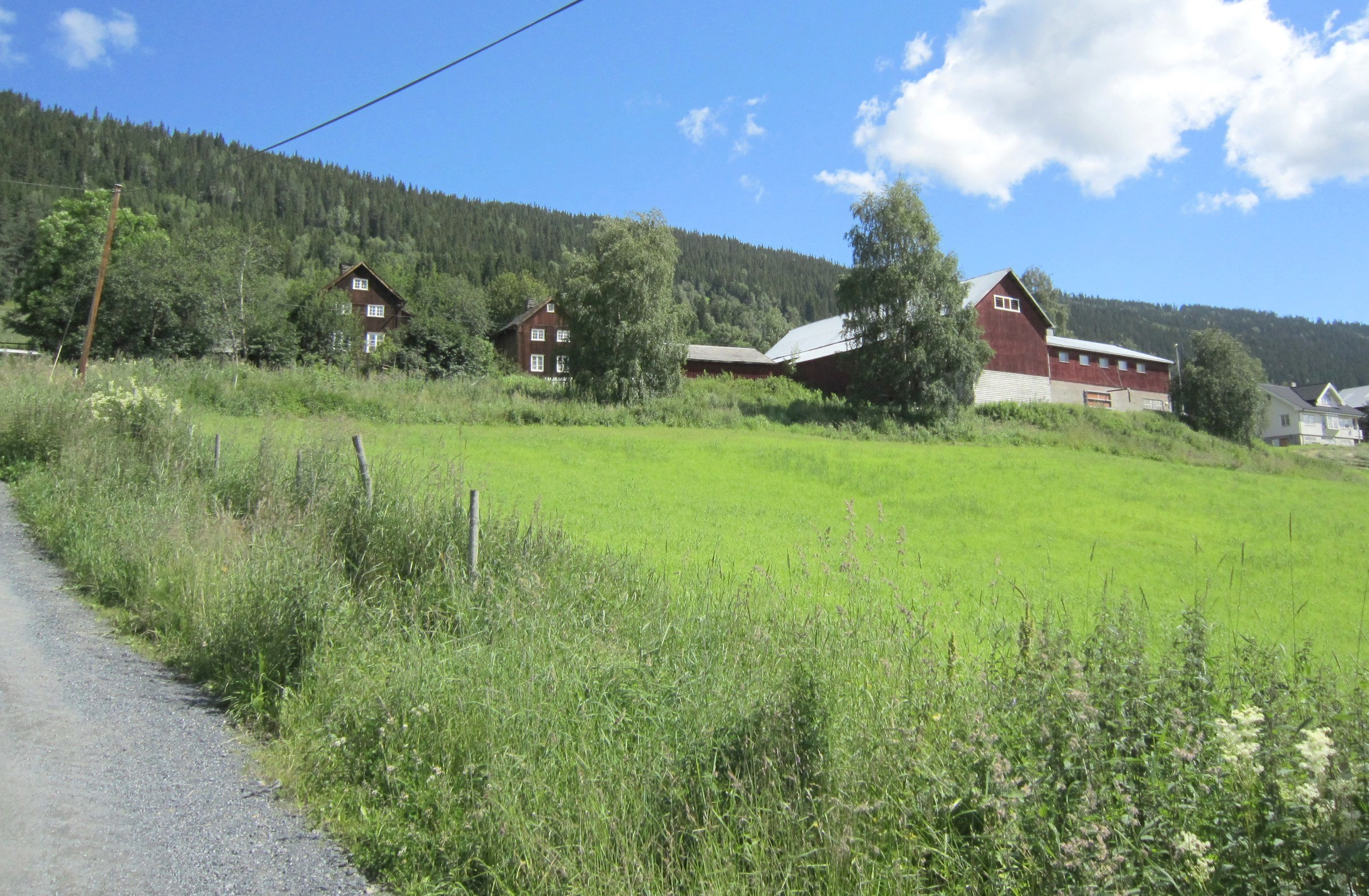
Lomen Stave Church

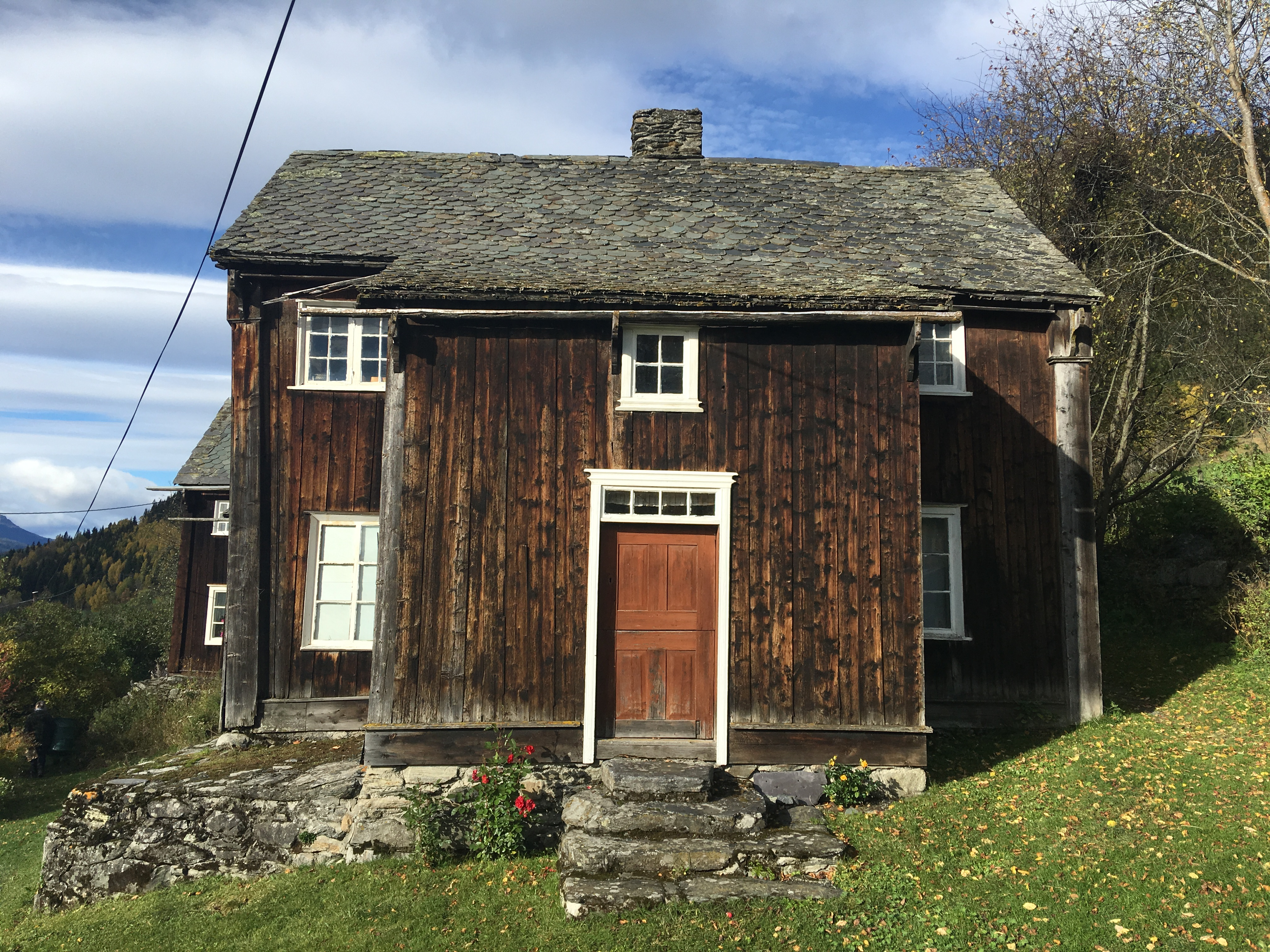
Nils Ormstad's house (historic site)

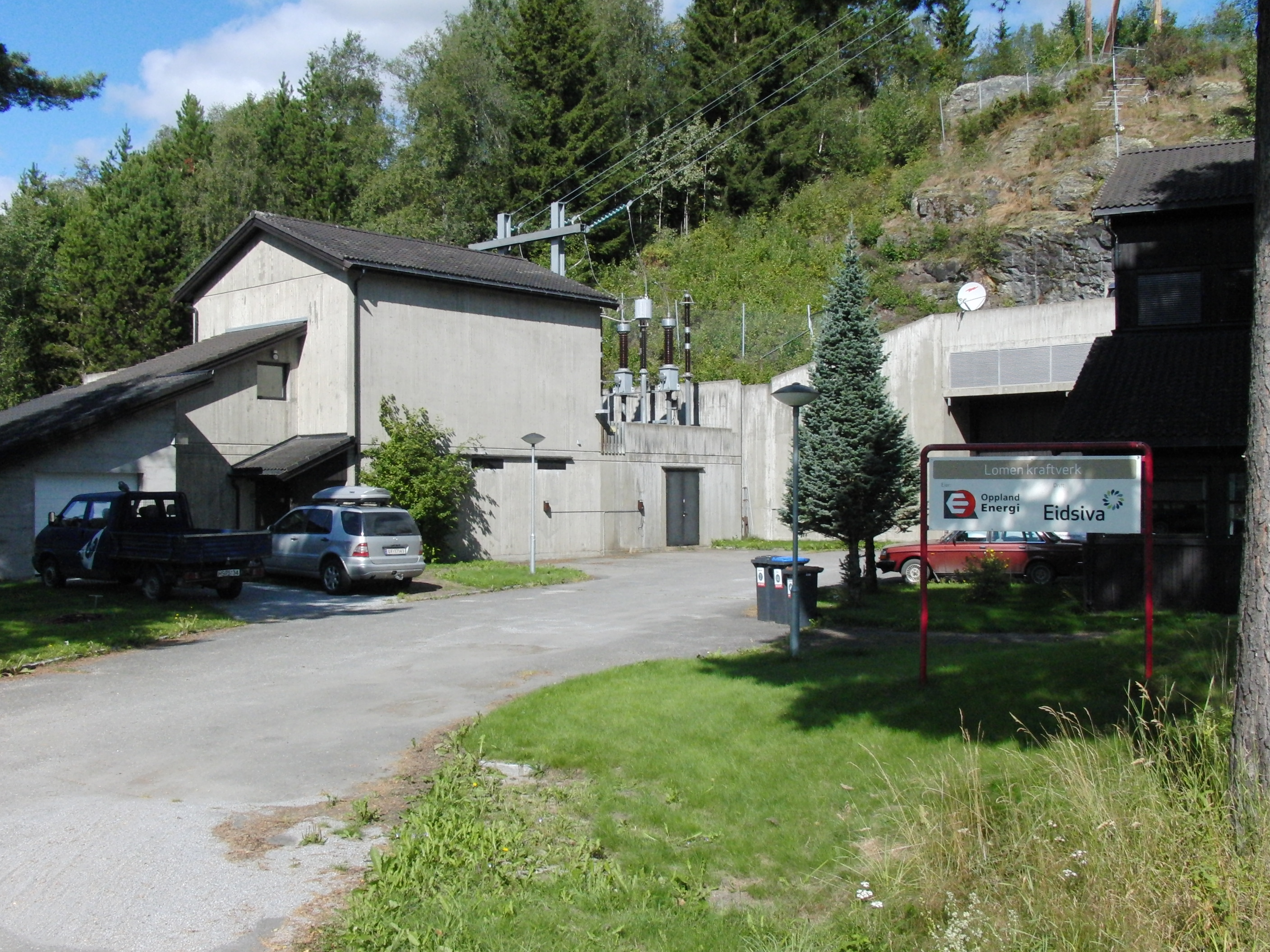
Lomen power station
