= Lomen Church =

Church in Innlandet, Norway

- Lomen kyrkje
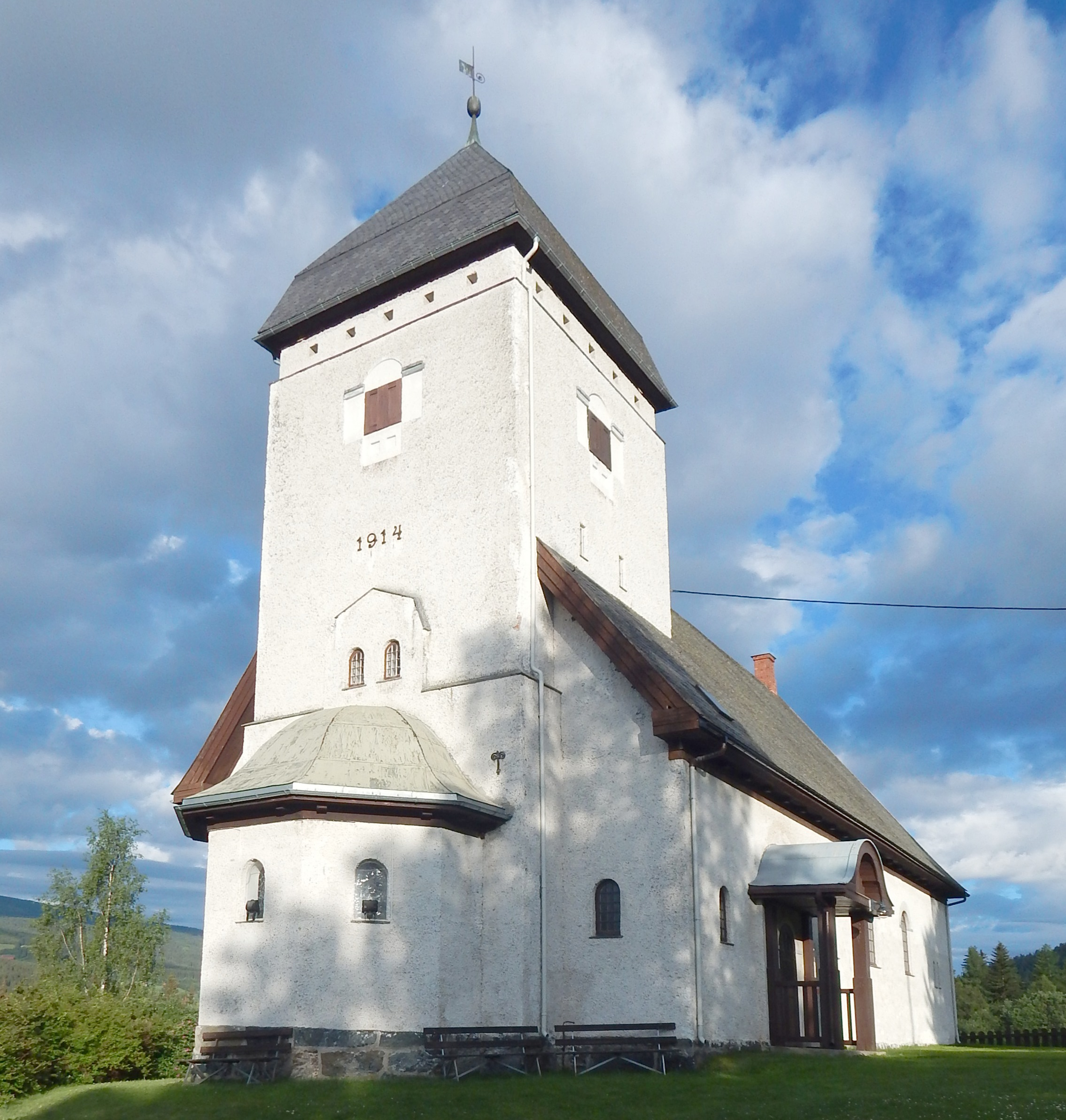
- View of the church Credit: Jan-Tore Egge
- Lomen Church
- 61°07′58″N 8°53′26″E
- Location: Vestre Slidre, Innlandet
- Country: Norway
- Denomination: Church of Norway
- Previous denomination: Catholic Church
- Churchmanship: Evangelical Lutheran

History
- Status: Parish church
- Founded: 1914
- Consecrated: 29 July 1914

Architecture
- Functional status: Active
- Architect: Heinrich Jürgensen
- Architectural type: Long church
- Style: Romanesque
- Completed: 1914 (112 years ago)

Specifications
- Capacity: 200
- Materials: Stone

Administration
- Diocese: Hamar bispedømme
- Deanery: Valdres prosti
- Parish: Lomen
- Norwegian Cultural Heritage Site
- Type: Church
- Status: Protected
- ID: 172057

Lomen Church (Norwegian: Lomen kyrkje) is a parish church of the Church of Norway in Vestre Slidre Municipality in Innlandet county, Norway. It is located in the village of Lomen. It is the church for the Lomen parish which is part of the Valdres prosti (deanery) in the Diocese of Hamar. The white, stone church was built in a long church design in 1914 using plans drawn up by the architect Heinrich Jürgensen. The church seats about 200 people.

== History ==
Historically, the Lomen Stave Church was the main church for the Lomen area. In 1903, the graveyard surrounding the church had become full, so a new cemetery was established about 1.75 kilometres (1.09 mi) to the southwest of the church. The new site was just off the main road along the northern shore of the Slidrefjorden. Not long after that, the old church was deemed to be too small for the congregation. The parish decided to build a new church at the site of the new cemetery. Heinrich Jürgensen was hired to design the new stone church. The lead builder was Erik Erikson Mo from Øystre Slidre Municipality. In the winter of 1912–13, most of the materials were transported to the site by horse. The church had a rectangular nave and a narrower choir on the east end. There is a prominent tower above the choir which is flanked by sacristies. The new church was consecrated on 29 July 1914. After the new church was put into use, the old Lomen Stave Church was taken out of regular use, but it is still used for special occasions.

== See also ==
- List of churches in Hamar
- Lomen Stave Church
