= Lomen Stave Church =

Church in Innlandet, Norway

- Lome stavkyrkje
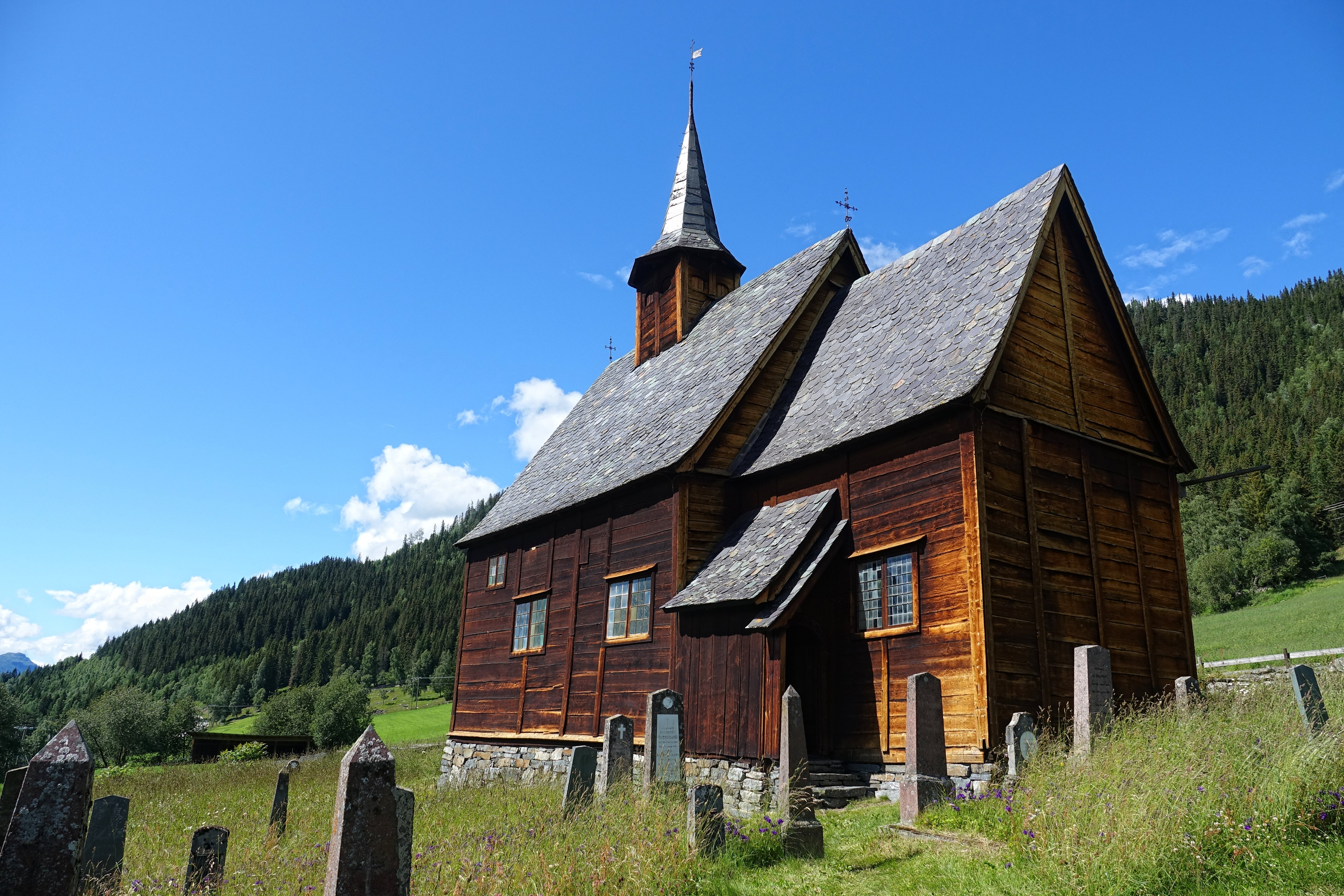
- View of the church
- Lomen Stave Church
- 61°08′05″N 8°55′26″E
- Location: Vestre Slidre, Innlandet
- Country: Norway
- Denomination: Church of Norway
- Previous denomination: Catholic Church
- Churchmanship: Evangelical Lutheran

History
- Status: Parish church
- Founded: c. 1192
- Consecrated: c. 1192

Architecture
- Functional status: Active
- Architectural type: Long church
- Style: Stave church
- Completed: c. 1192 (834 years ago)

Specifications
- Capacity: 150
- Materials: Wood

Administration
- Diocese: Hamar bispedømme
- Deanery: Valdres prosti
- Parish: Lomen
- Norwegian Cultural Heritage Site
- Type: Church
- Status: Automatically protected
- ID: 84323

Lomen Stave Church (Norwegian: Lomen stavkyrkje) is a stave church of the Church of Norway in Vestre Slidre Municipality in Innlandet county, Norway. It is located in the village of Lomen. It was formerly the church for the Lomen parish which is part of the Valdres prosti (deanery) in the Diocese of Hamar. The brown, wooden church was built in a long church design around the year 1192 using plans drawn up by an unknown architect. The church seats about 150 people.

== History ==
The earliest existing historical records of the church date back to the year 1325, but the church was not new that year. The wooden stave church was established during the late 12th century. Through 20th-century dendrochronological dating the logs of the church were dated to the year 1192, so the church must have been built around that time. Originally, the church was named "Hvams kirke". The church has a rectangular nave, a narrower and lower chancel, and a small sacristy on the south side of the chancel. The church is supported by four columns, and has three lavishly carved portals, chancel-arches, and column capitals.

The church was rebuilt and enlarged in 1749. The old choir was torn down and replaced with a wider choir. The old open-air corridors that used to surround the nave were incorporated into the nave. The west wall of the nave was moved about 2.7 metres (8 ft 10 in) further west to lengthen the old nave. A new tower was built on top of the roof of the nave as well. After this project, only some of the wall and roof timbers remained from the original stave church.

By the second half of the 19th century, the church was said to be in poor condition and small. In 1895, the church was inspected and said to be so leaky in the winter that it is almost too dangerous to use. Discussions ensued as to whether the church should be remodeled and fixed up or if it should be torn down and replaced. Some wanted the old church to become a museum and to build a new church. In 1903, the graveyard surrounding the church had become full, so a new cemetery was established about 1.75 kilometres (1.09 mi) to the southwest of the church. The new site was just off the main road along the northern shore of the Slidrefjorden. The church was examined in 1904 by architect Holger Sinding-Larsen. He concluded that it would clearly be most reasonable to restore the church, even if it had to be moved. Sinding-Larsen also prepared a proposal for rebuilding the church, but this was never acted upon. In 1913, the government gave permission to build a new church at the site of the new cemetery as long as the old church was still maintained as a historic site. The new Lomen Church was consecrated on 29 July 1914. After the new church was put into use, the old Lomen Stave Church was taken out of regular use, but it is still used for special occasions during the summer such as weddings, baptisms, and an annual Olsok service. The church was never wired for electricity and has no heat other than a wood stove.

During the last refurbishment of the old church, an archaeological excavation was carried out and 71 artifacts were found, including pieces of jewelry and coins. Some of the coins were as old as the 12th century. Lomen Stave Church houses the pedestal of a baptismal font dating from the 1200s.

== Media gallery ==
=== Illustrations ===
Ole Andreas Øverland drew illustration of the portal from Lomen Stave Church in volume 2 of his five part series Illustreret Norges Historie 02 Fra Kristendommmens Indførelse til Magnus Erlingssøns Fald (published by Folkebladet in Kristiania in 1886).

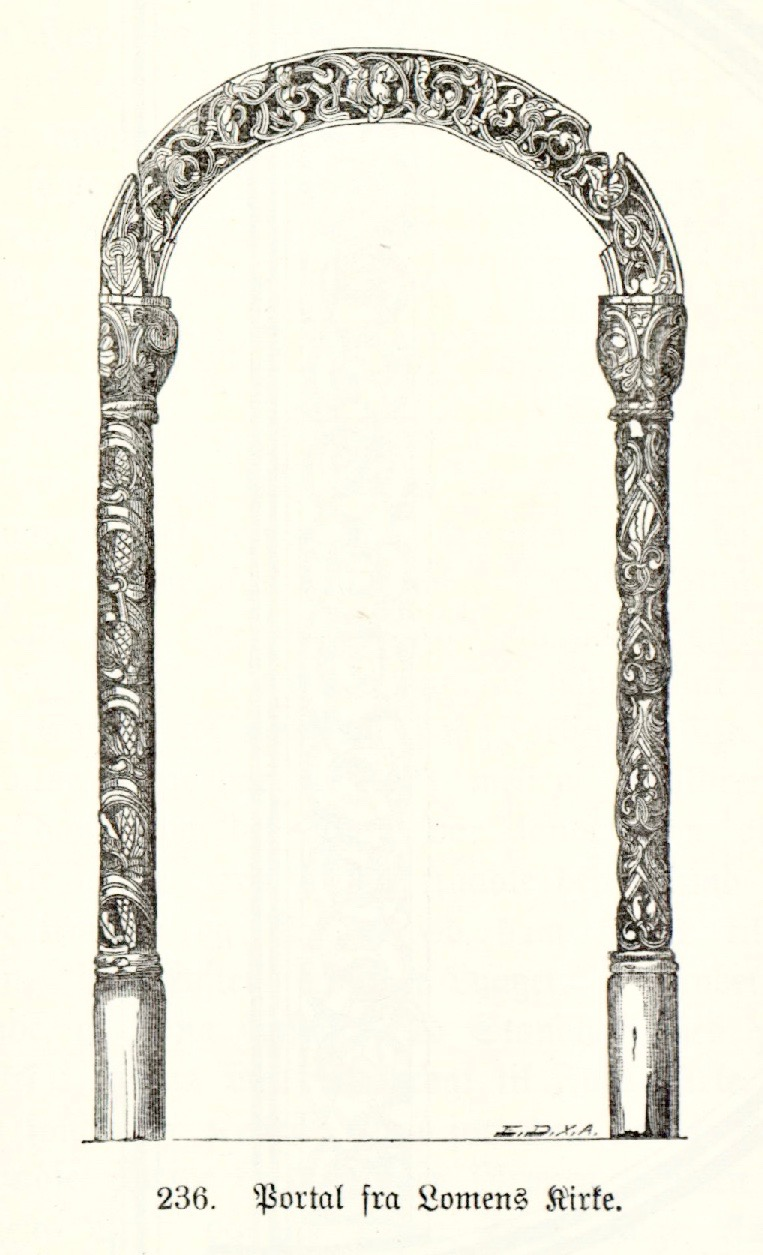

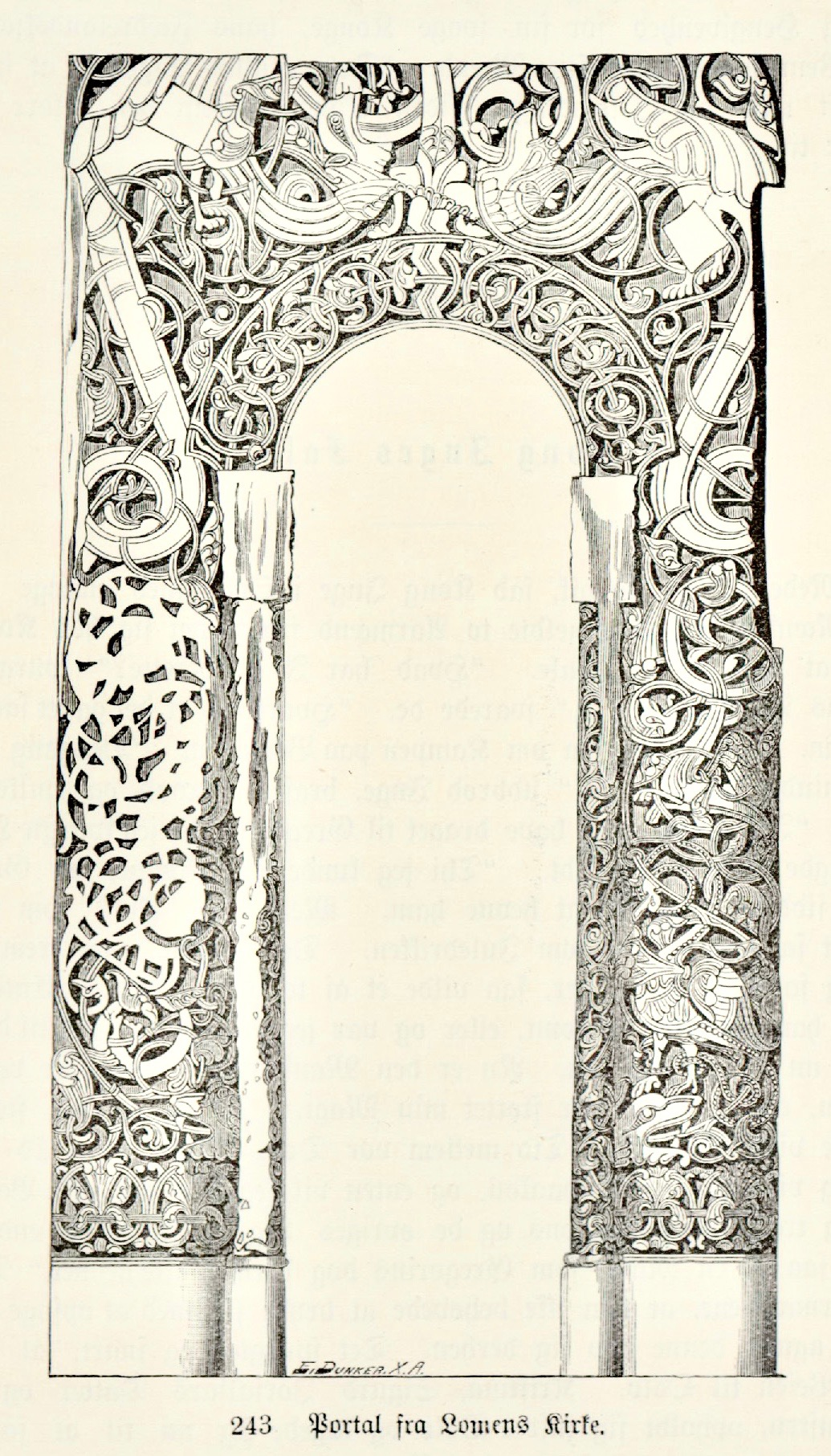

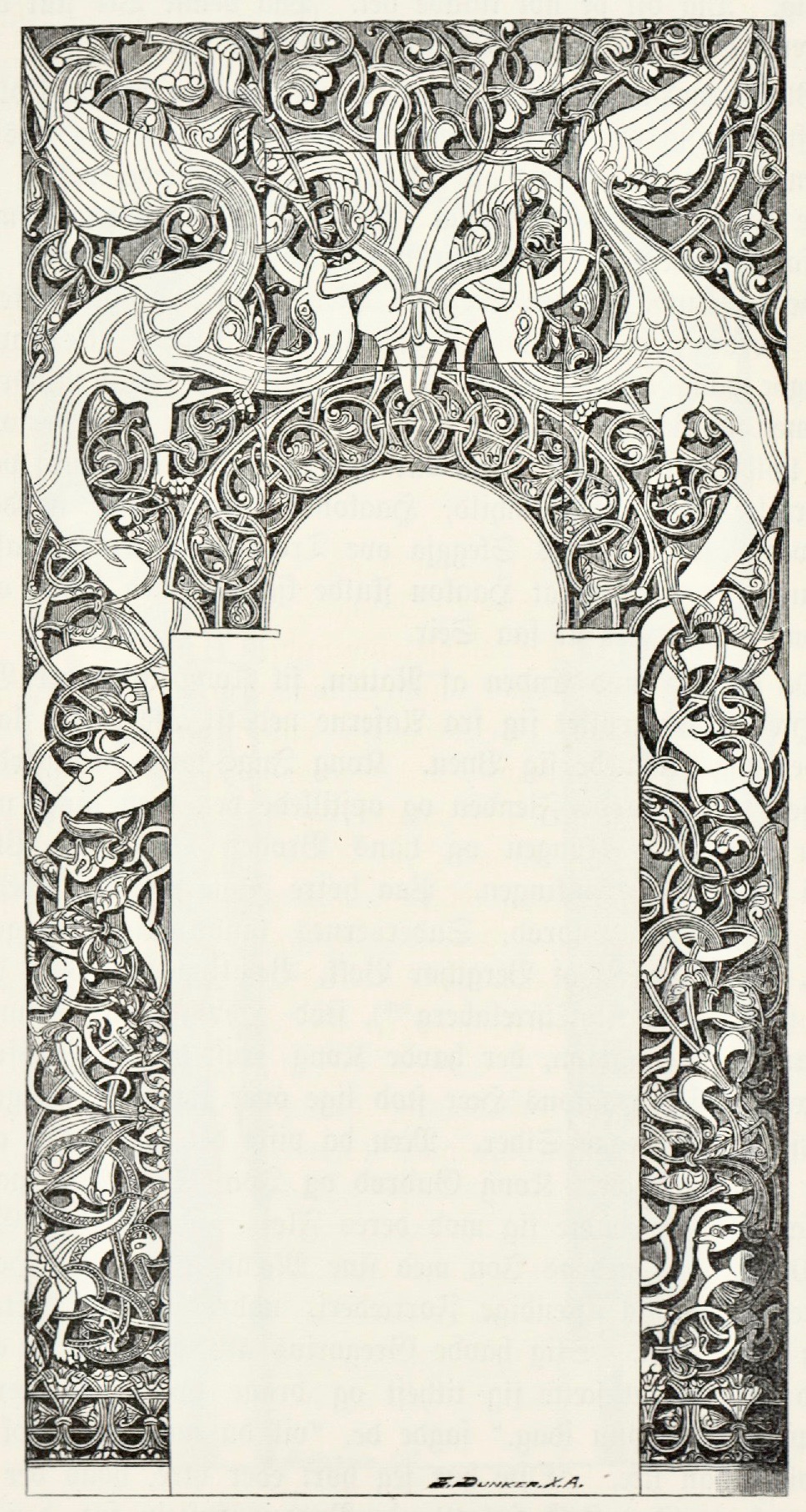

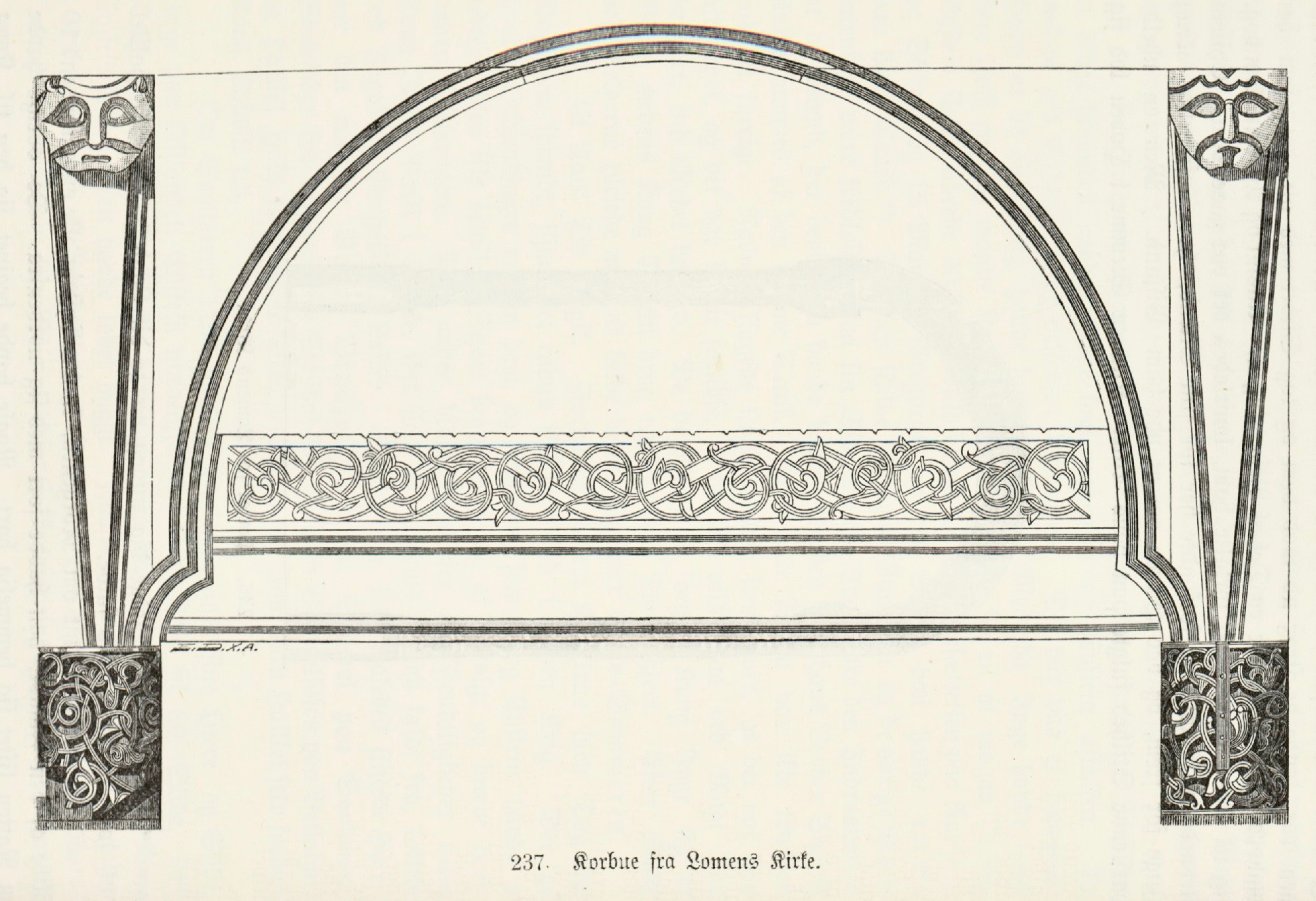

=== Photographs ===
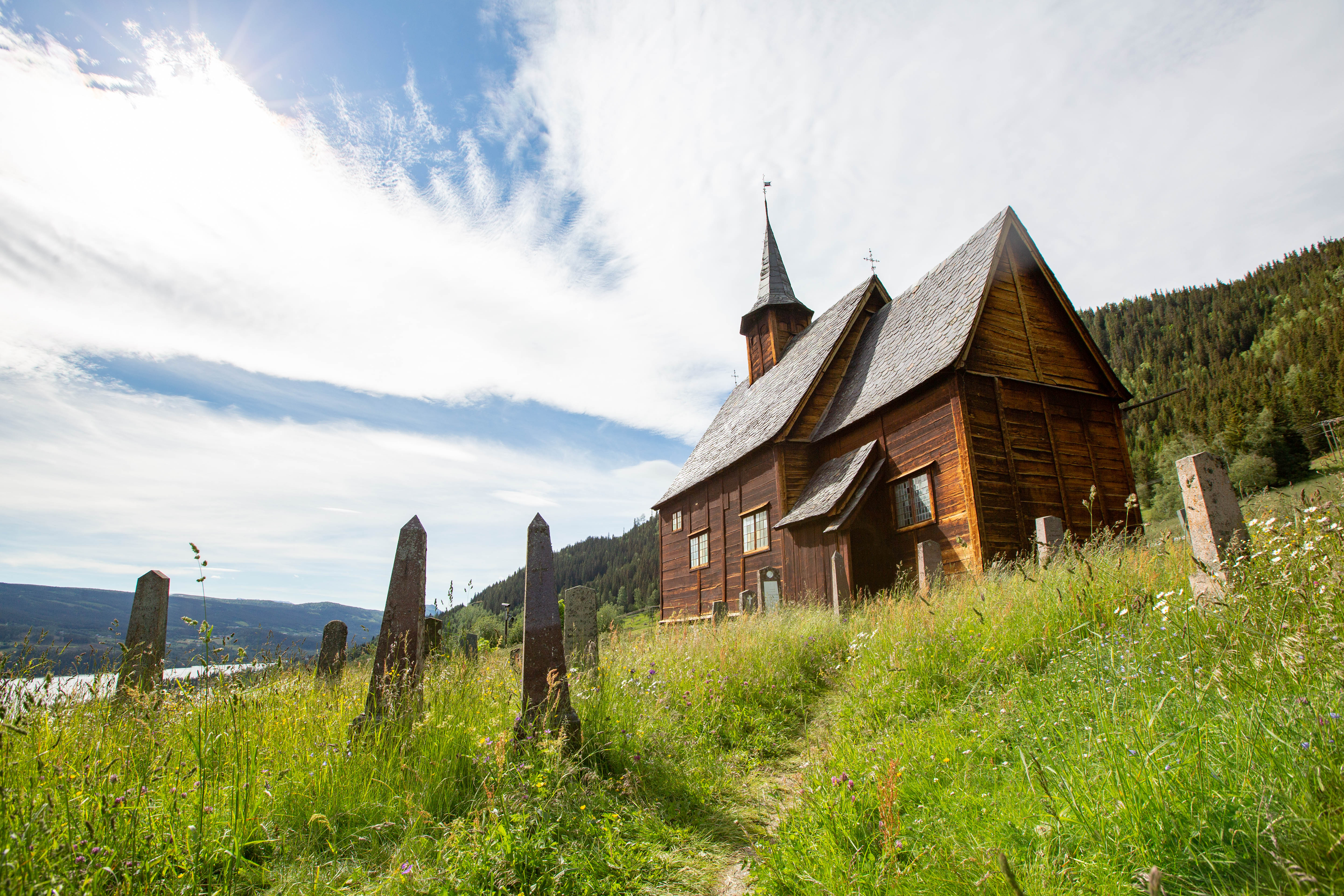

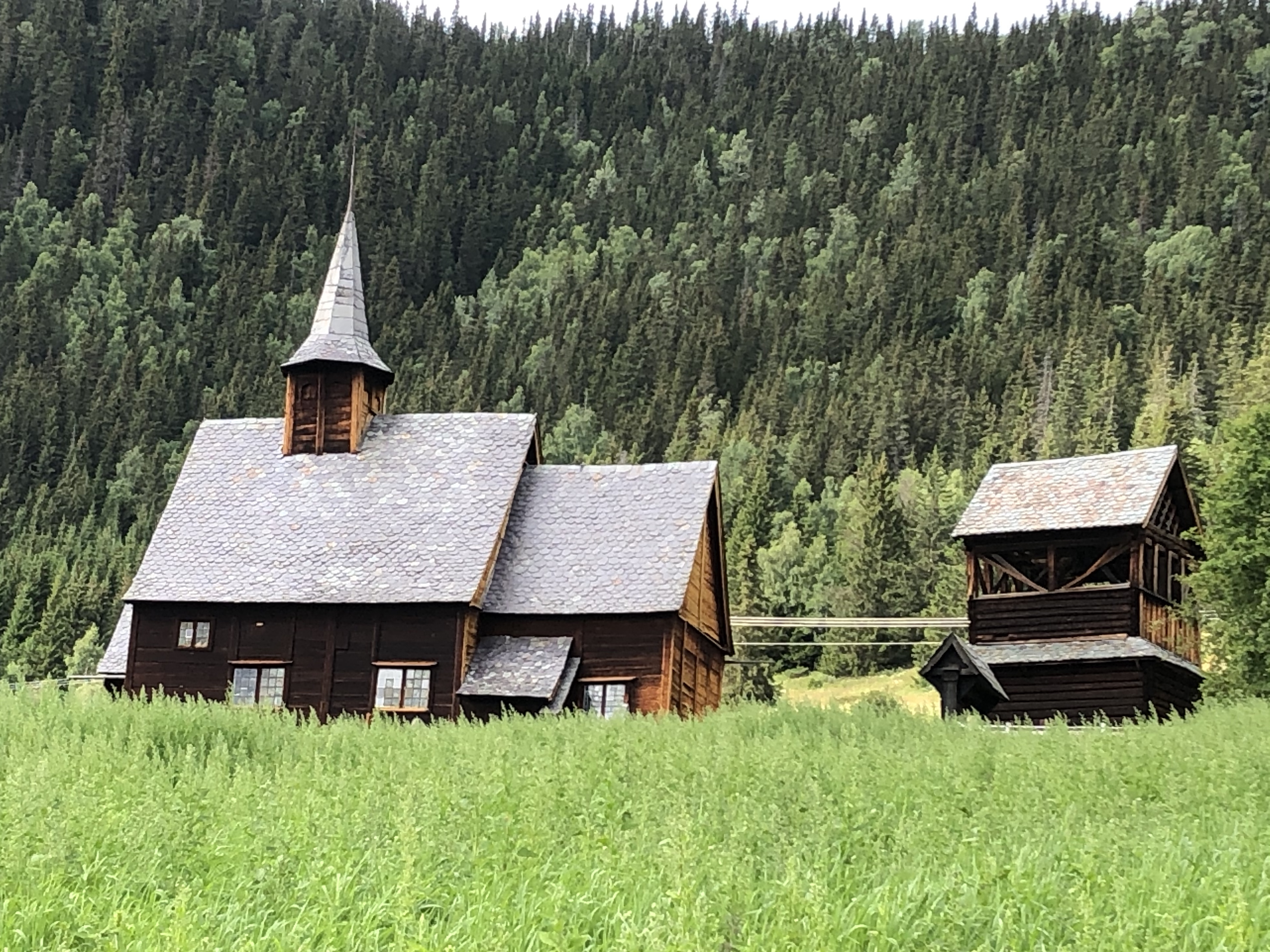

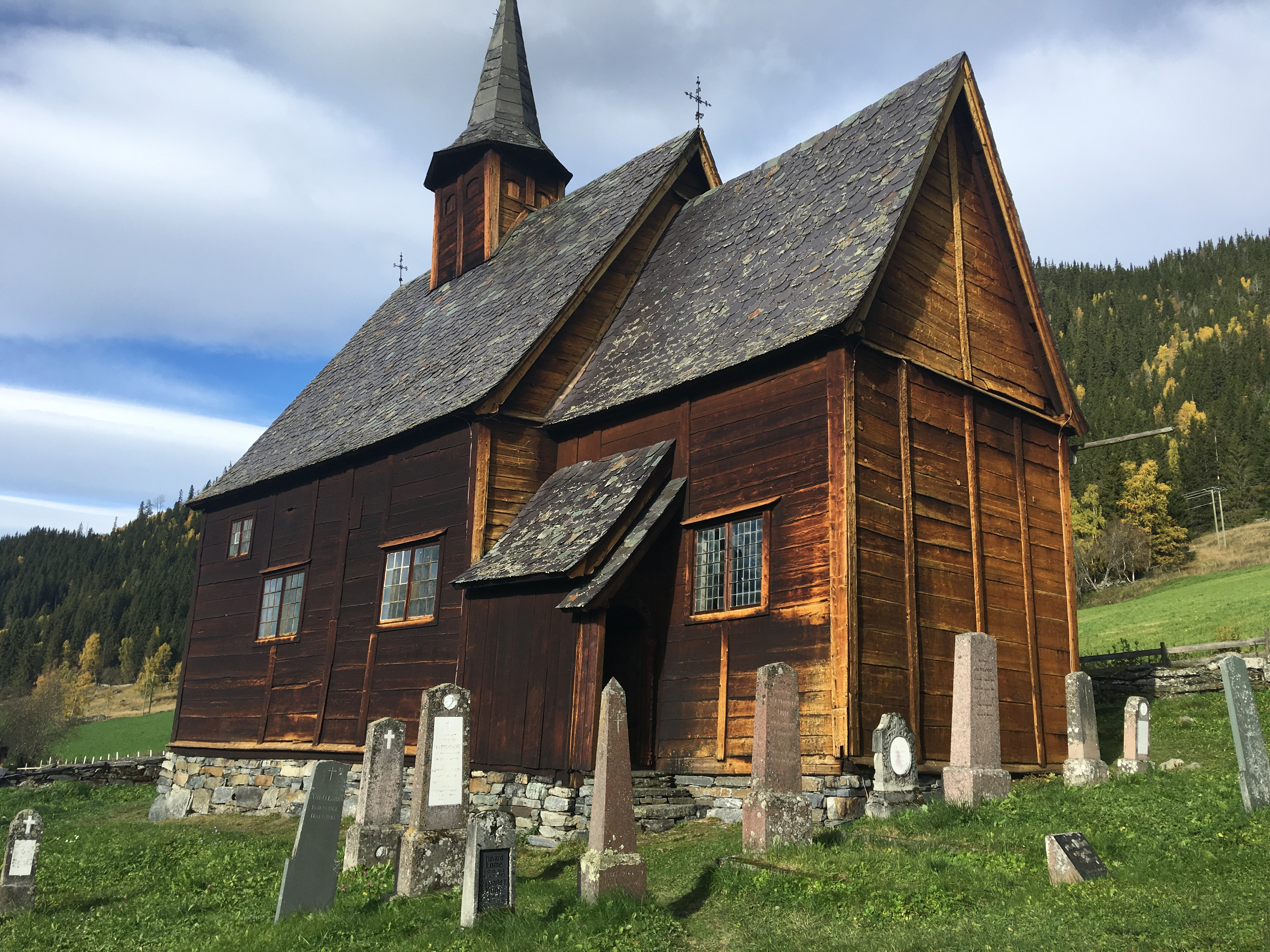

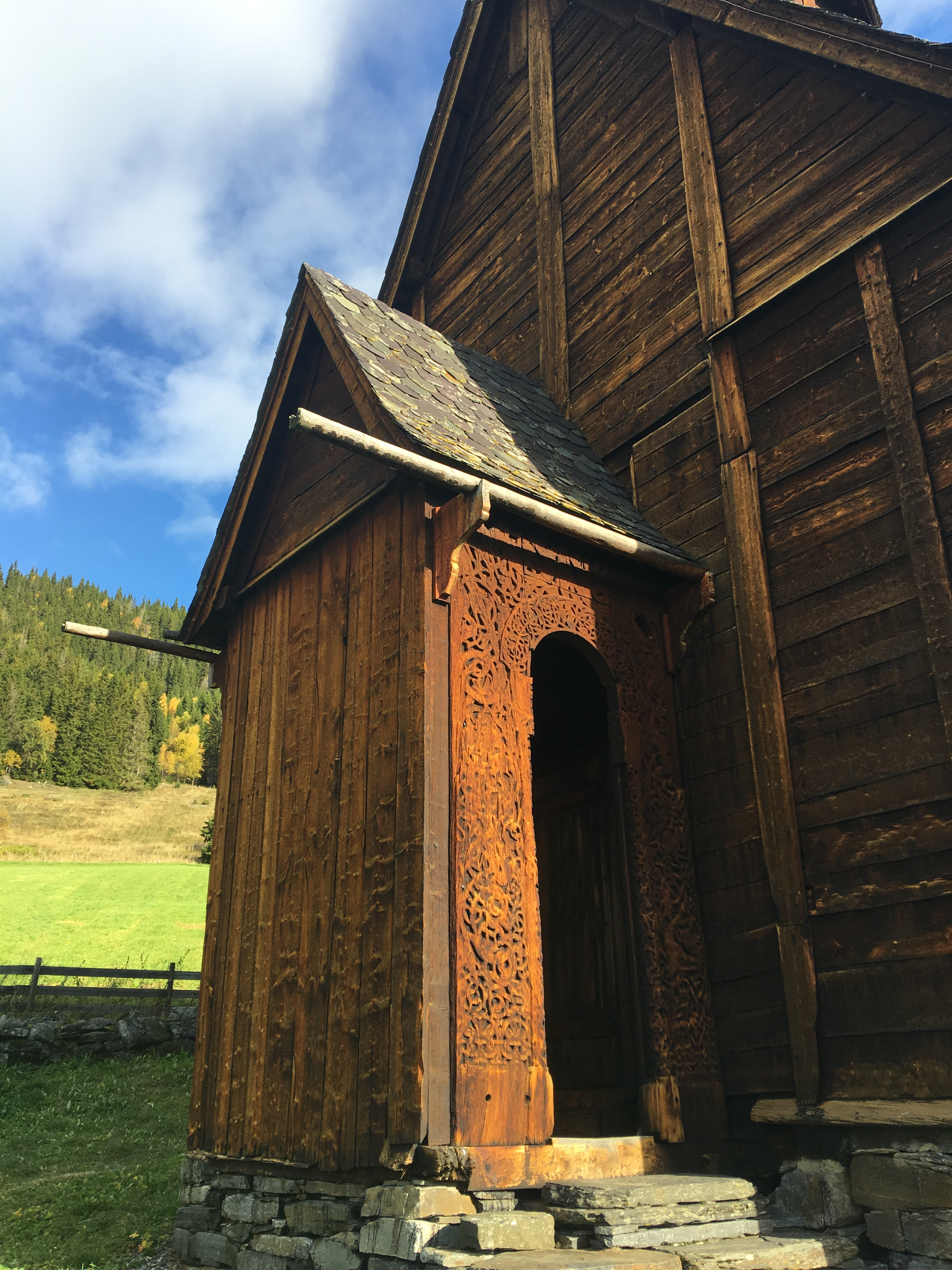

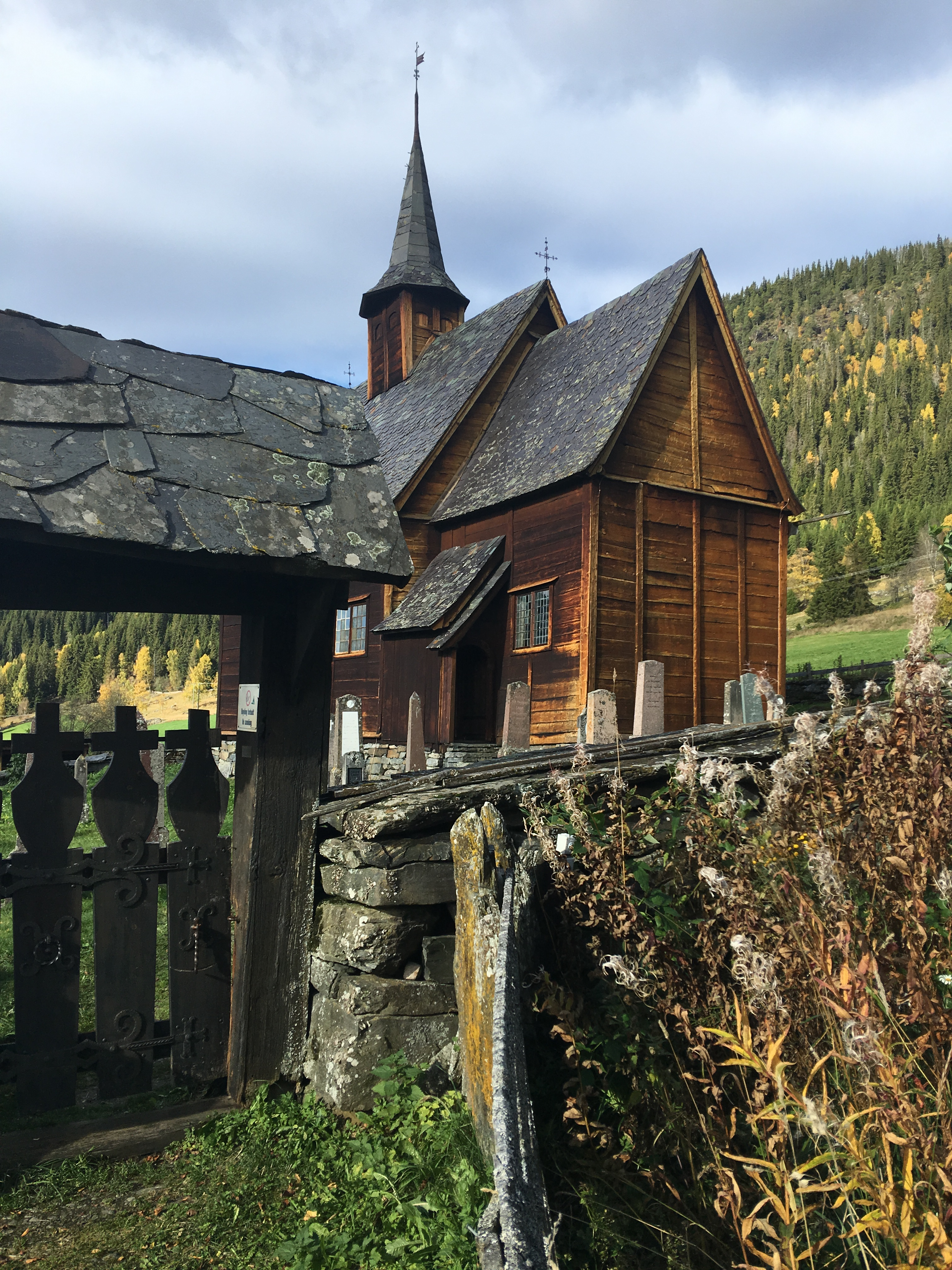

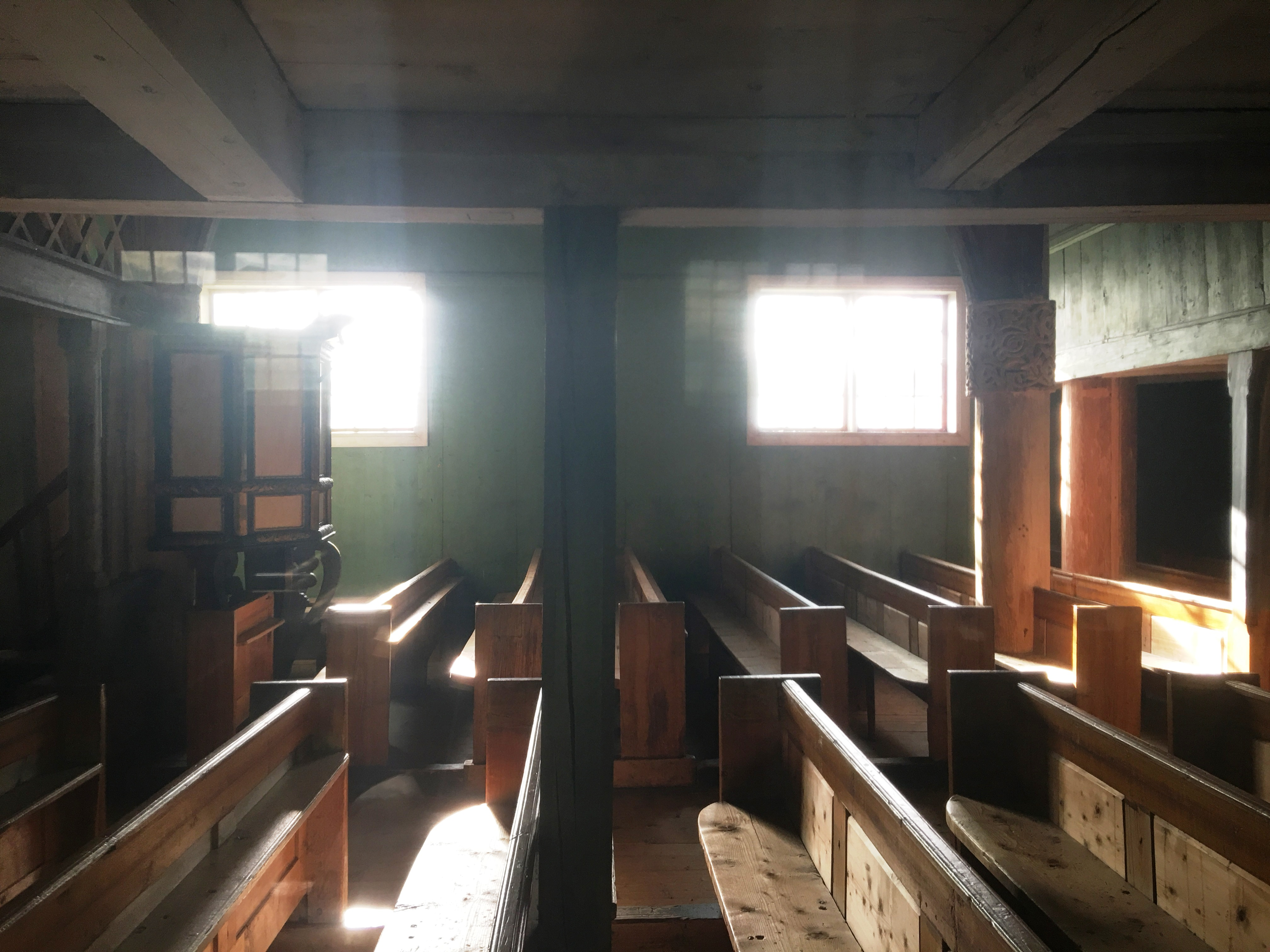

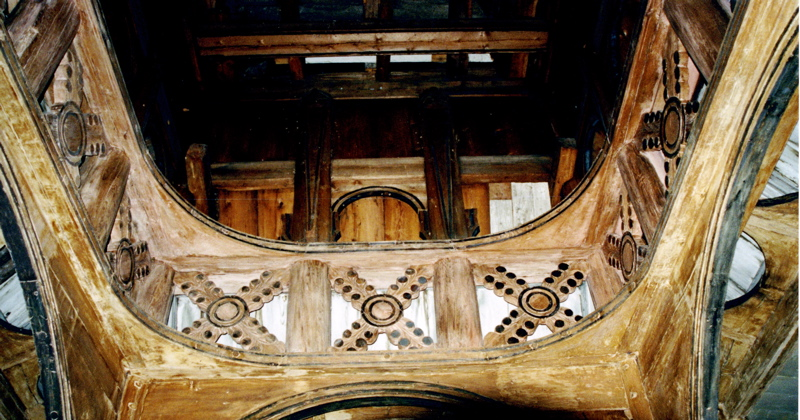

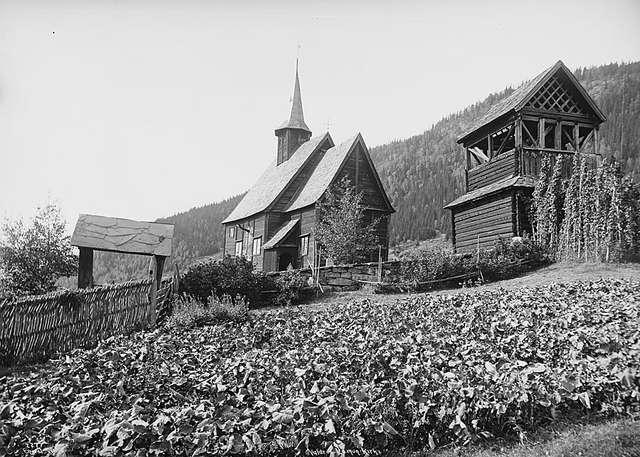

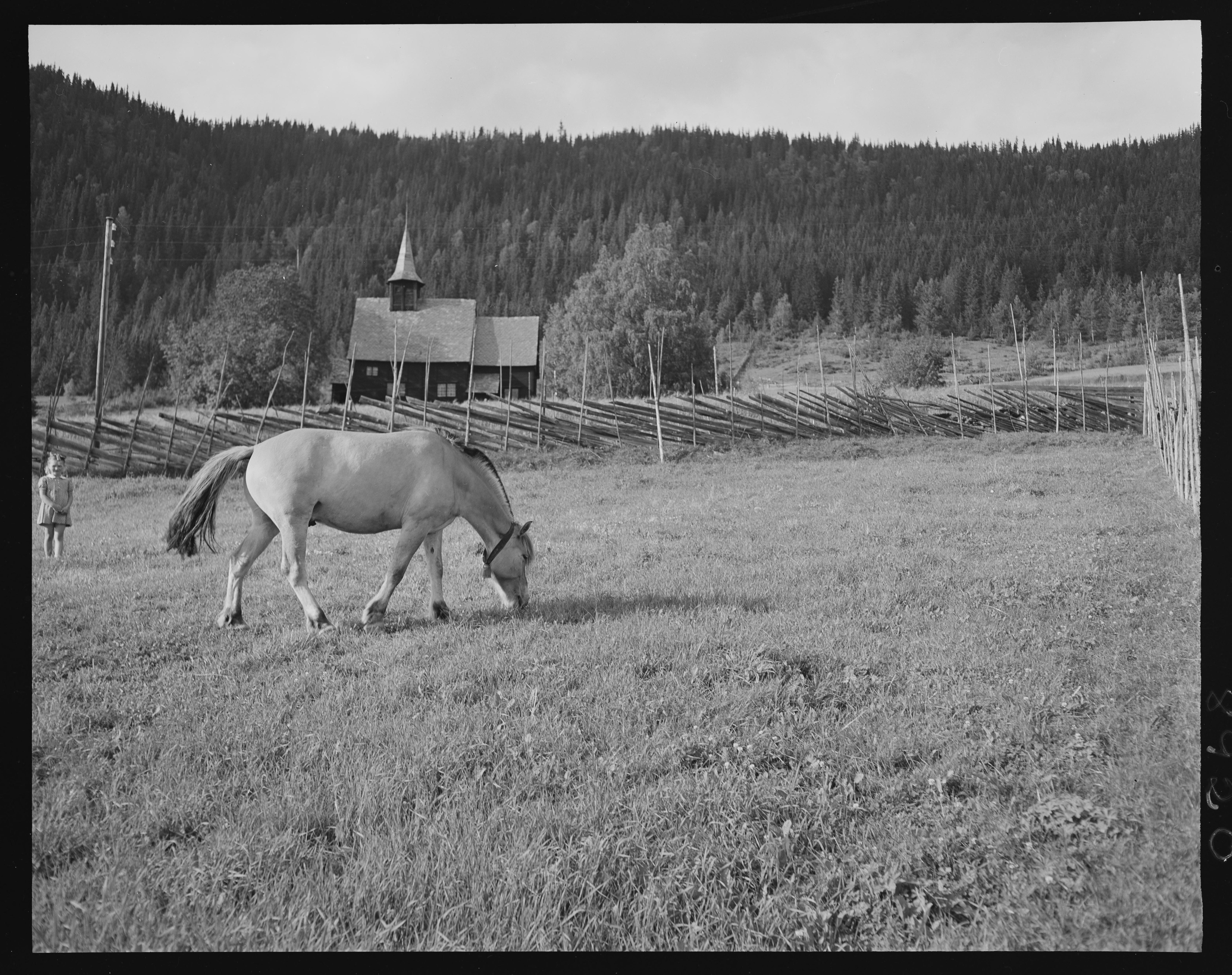

== See also ==
- List of churches in Hamar

== Related reading ==
- Anker, Leif (2005). The Norwegian Stave Churches. Oslo: Arfo Forlag. ISBN 978-8291399294.
