= Slidredomen =

Church in Innlandet, Norway

Vestre Slidre Church Slidredomen
- Vestre Slidre kirke
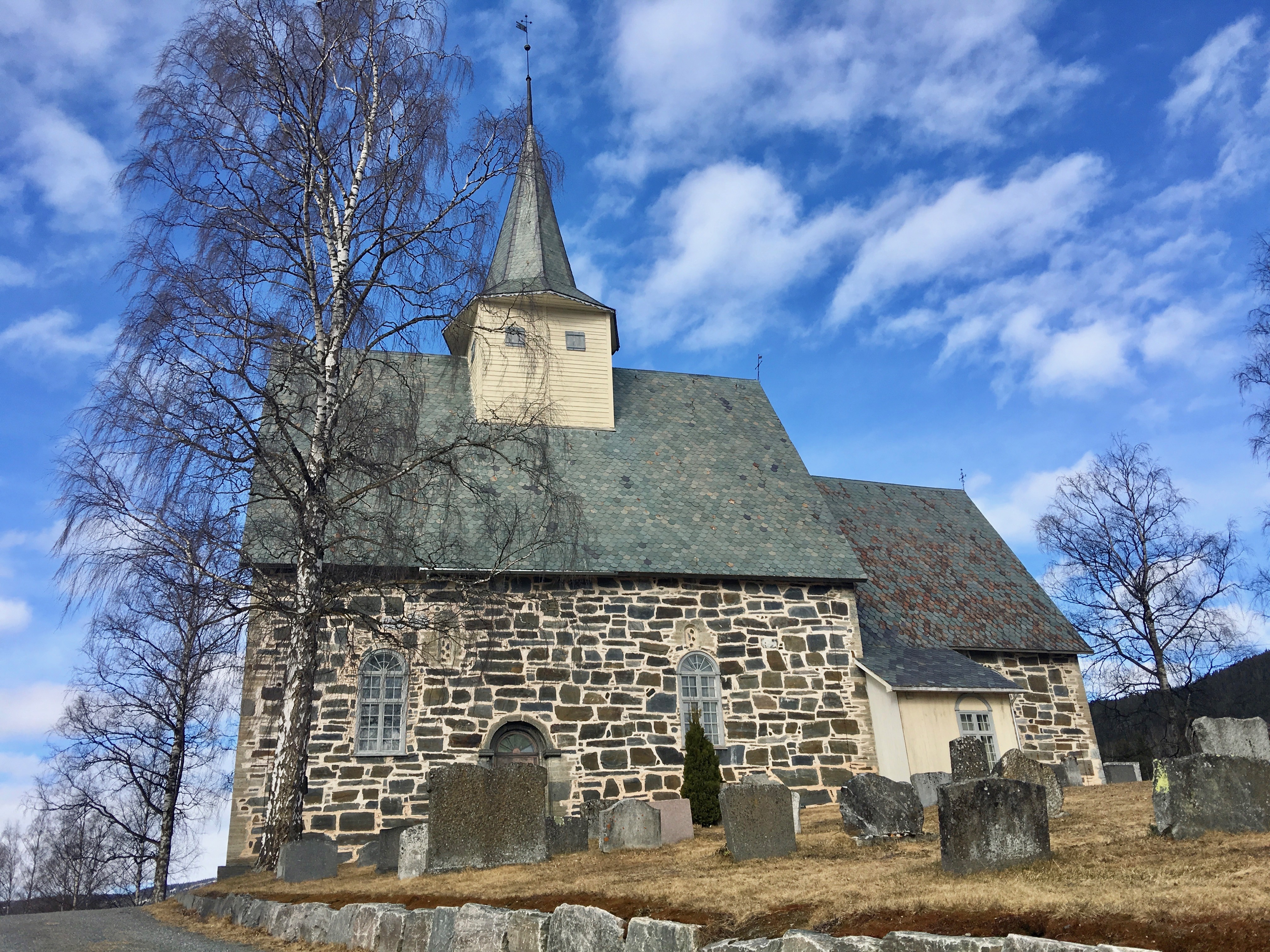
- View of the church
- Vestre Slidre Church; Slidredomen
- 61°05′25″N 8°58′48″E
- Location: Vestre Slidre, Innlandet
- Country: Norway
- Denomination: Church of Norway
- Previous denomination: Catholic Church
- Churchmanship: Evangelical Lutheran

History
- Status: Parish church
- Founded: c. 1170
- Consecrated: c. 1170

Architecture
- Functional status: Active
- Architectural type: Long church
- Style: Romanesque
- Completed: c. 1170 (856 years ago)

Specifications
- Capacity: 200
- Materials: Stone

Administration
- Diocese: Hamar bispedømme
- Deanery: Valdres prosti
- Parish: Slidre
- Norwegian Cultural Heritage Site
- Type: Church
- Status: Automatically protected
- ID: 85499

Vestre Slidre Church (Norwegian: Vestre Slidre kirke or Slidredomen) is a parish church of the Church of Norway in Vestre Slidre Municipality in Innlandet county, Norway. It is located on a hill in the village of Slidre at the northern end of Slidrefjord. It is the church for the Slidre parish which is part of the Valdres prosti (deanery) in the Diocese of Hamar. The old stone church was built in a long church design around the year 1170 using plans drawn up by an unknown architect. The church seats about 200 people.

== History ==
The earliest existing historical records of the church date back to the year 1264 in a letter from the Pope, but the church was not new that year. The church at Slidre was built around the year 1170. It is a Romanesque stone church, which has a rectangular nave and a narrower, square choir. The stone walls of the nave are 160–170 centimetres (63–67 in) thick, except for the west wall which is approximately 215 centimetres (85 in) thick. The church roof was repaired or replaced around 1266-1268 (according to 20th century dendrochronological dating). There is a tower on the roof of the nave. Interestingly, there is no entrance on the west end of the nave as is common in most churches in Norway (probably because the terrain on that side of the church is quite steep). The main entrance is on the south side of the nave, with another entrance on the north side. During the Middle Ages, this was the parish church for all of Slidre as well as the seat of the Valdres prosti.

In 1620, the north entrance to the church was closed up and filled in with stone to match the rest of the walls. Around 1700, the old tower was removed and a new tower was built on the same location. In 1736, the original narrow entrance from the nave to the choir was enlarged and made much wider.

In 1814, this church served as an election church (Norwegian: valgkirke). Together with more than 300 other parish churches across Norway, it was a polling station for elections to the 1814 Norwegian Constituent Assembly which wrote the Constitution of Norway. This was Norway's first national elections. Each church parish was a constituency that elected people called "electors" who later met together in each county to elect the representatives for the assembly that was to meet at Eidsvoll Manor later that year.

During the late-1800s, a small wooden sacristy was built on the south side of the choir. The sacristy was enlarged in 1935 including putting a small basement underneath it. In 1955, plans were made for a comprehensive renovation of the building itself. As part of the repair, electric lighting and heating systems were installed. Also, the floors and ceilings were insulated and the sacristy was enlarged again. The architect for the work was Jens Dunker. The church was rededicated after the work on 26 September 1956. In 1961, the old north entrance to the church was re-opened (it had been walled over in 1620).

== Interior ==
The altarpiece dates to 1665 and was painted by Ola Hermundsson Berge (1768-1825) in 1797. Berge performed significant painting in the church between 1797 and 1798. The pulpit was carved by Hans Jonassen Felde in 1797. An organ was built by German-born organ builder Albert Hollenbach (1850-1904) in 1891. It was replaced in 1983 by a new mechanical organ from Norsk Orgel- og Harmoniumfabrikk of Snertingdal in Gjøvik Municipality.

== Media gallery ==
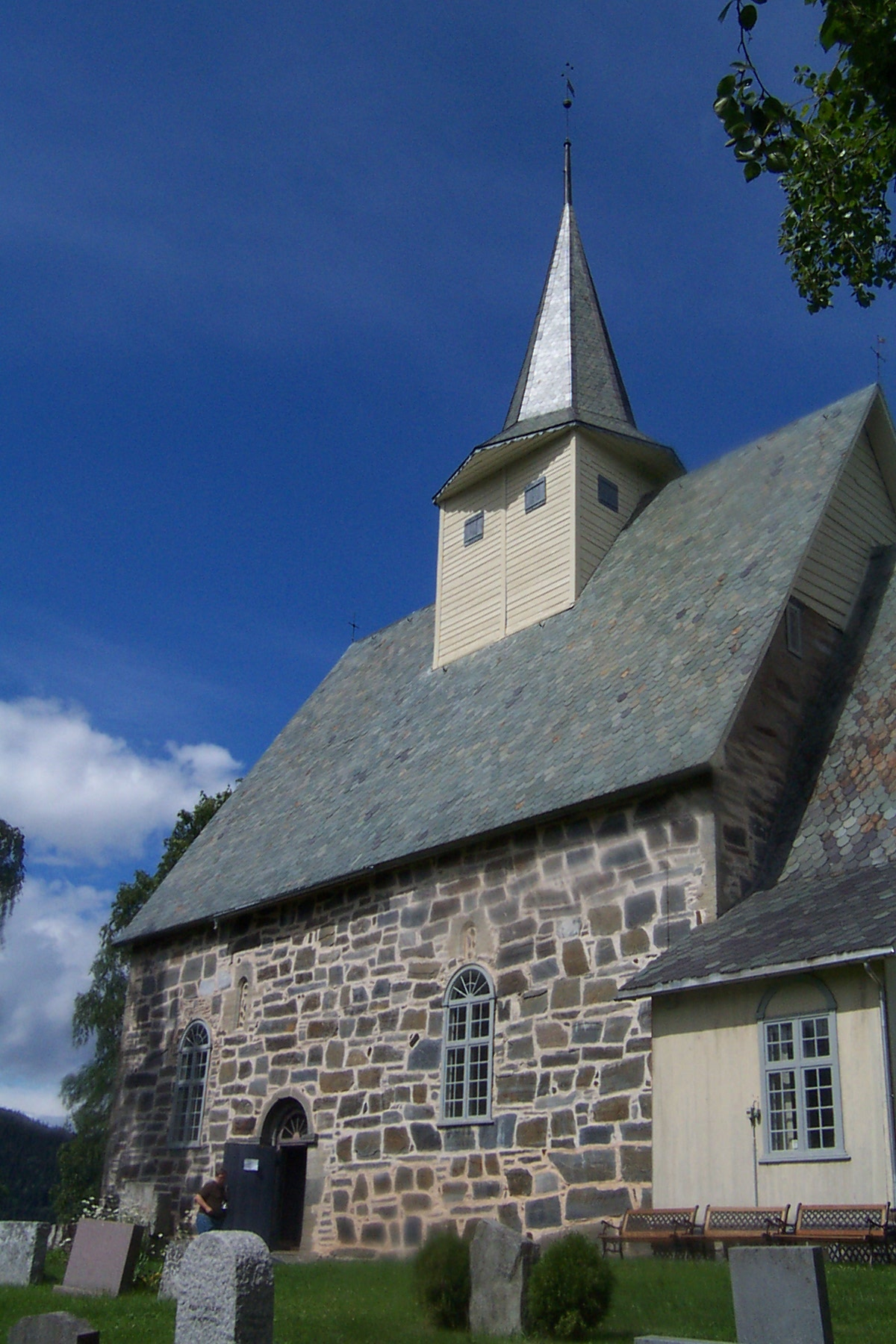

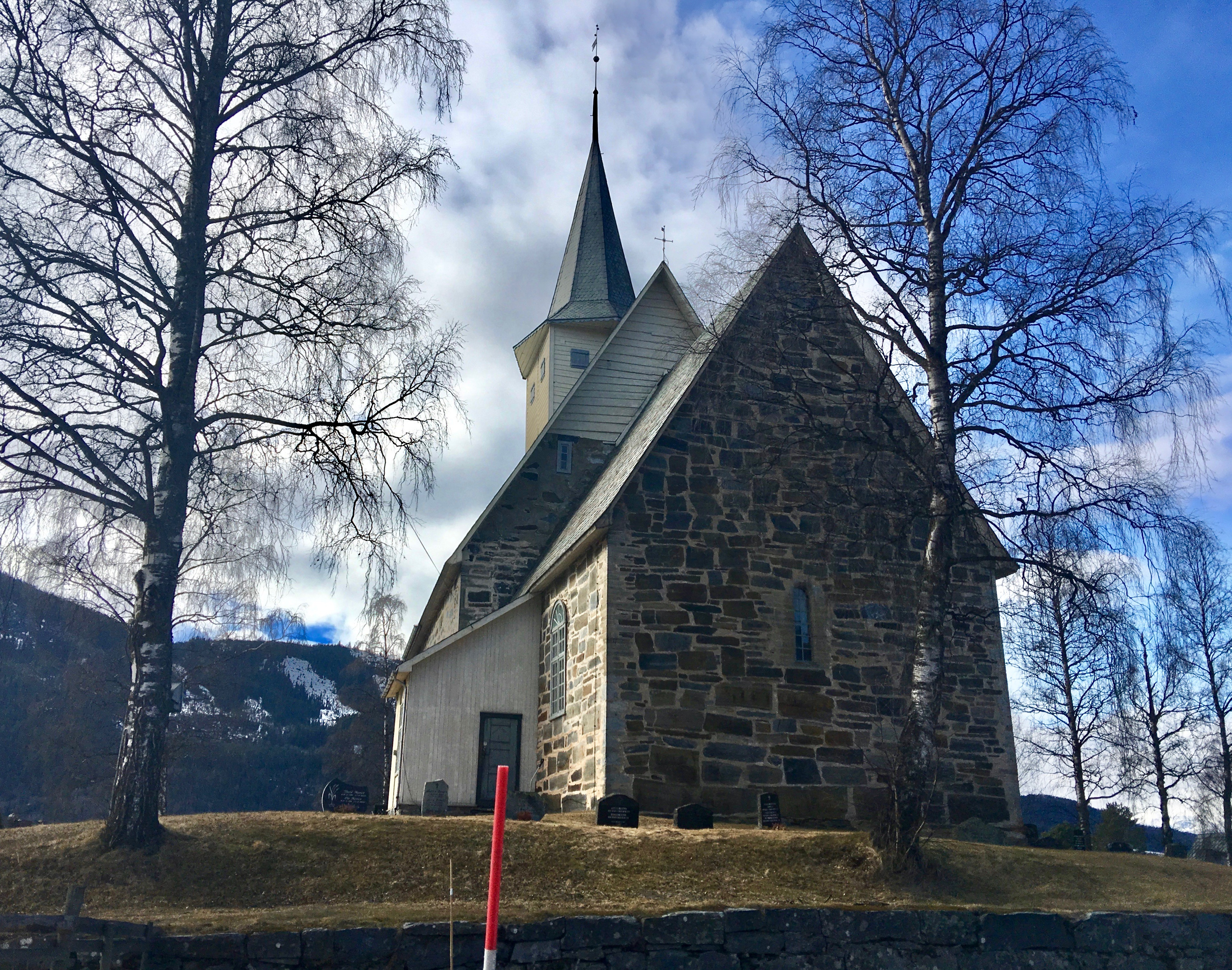

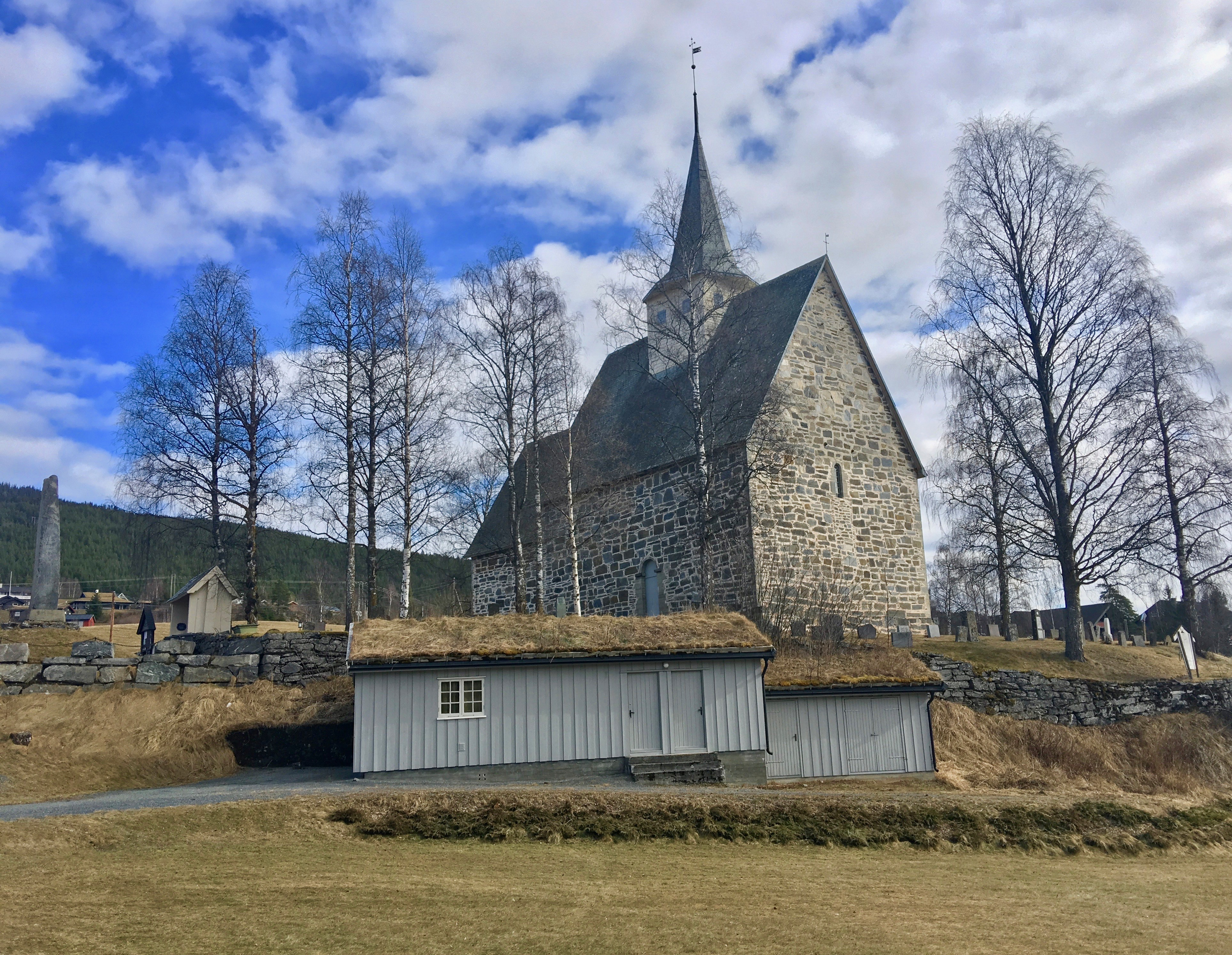

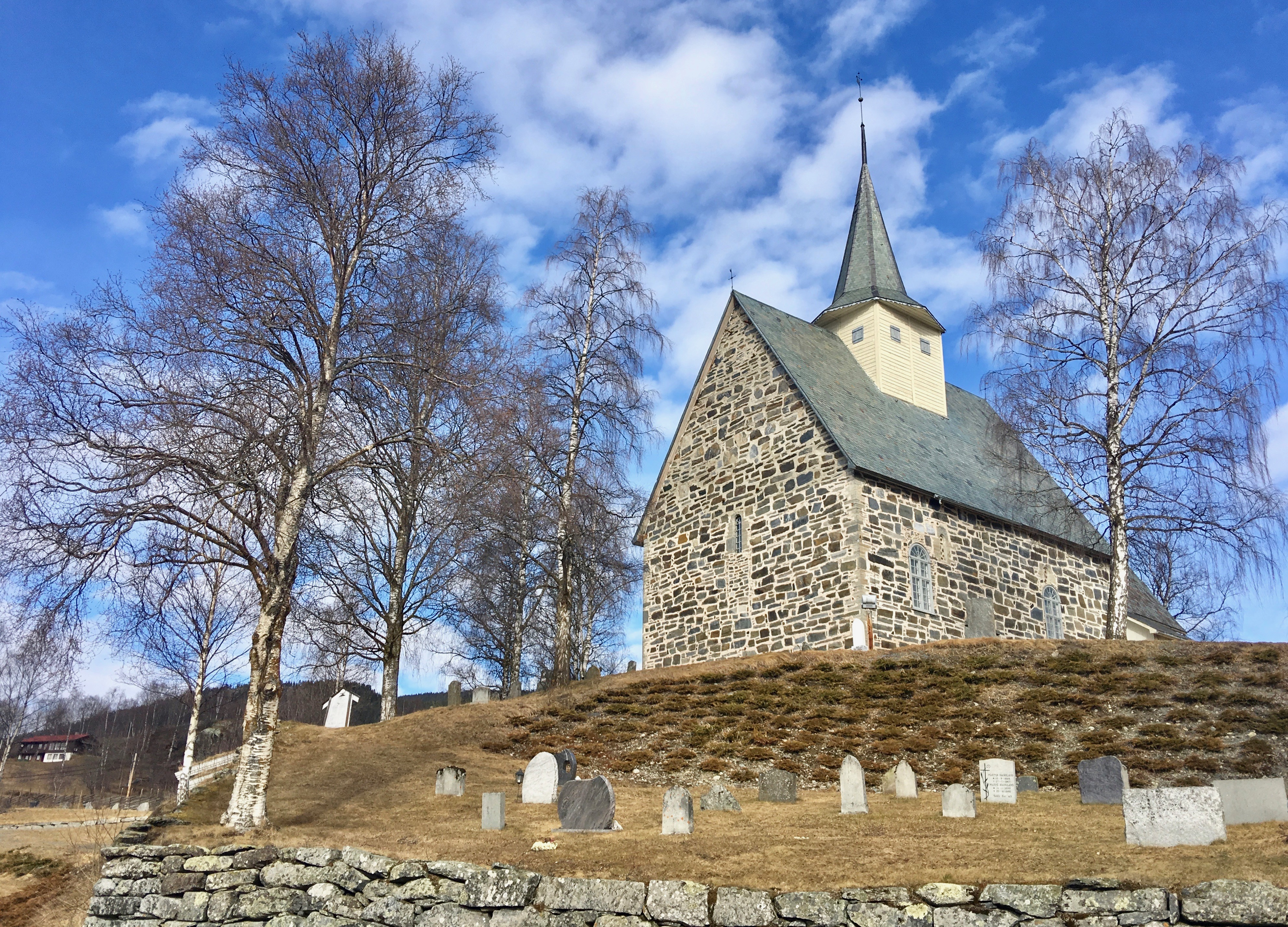

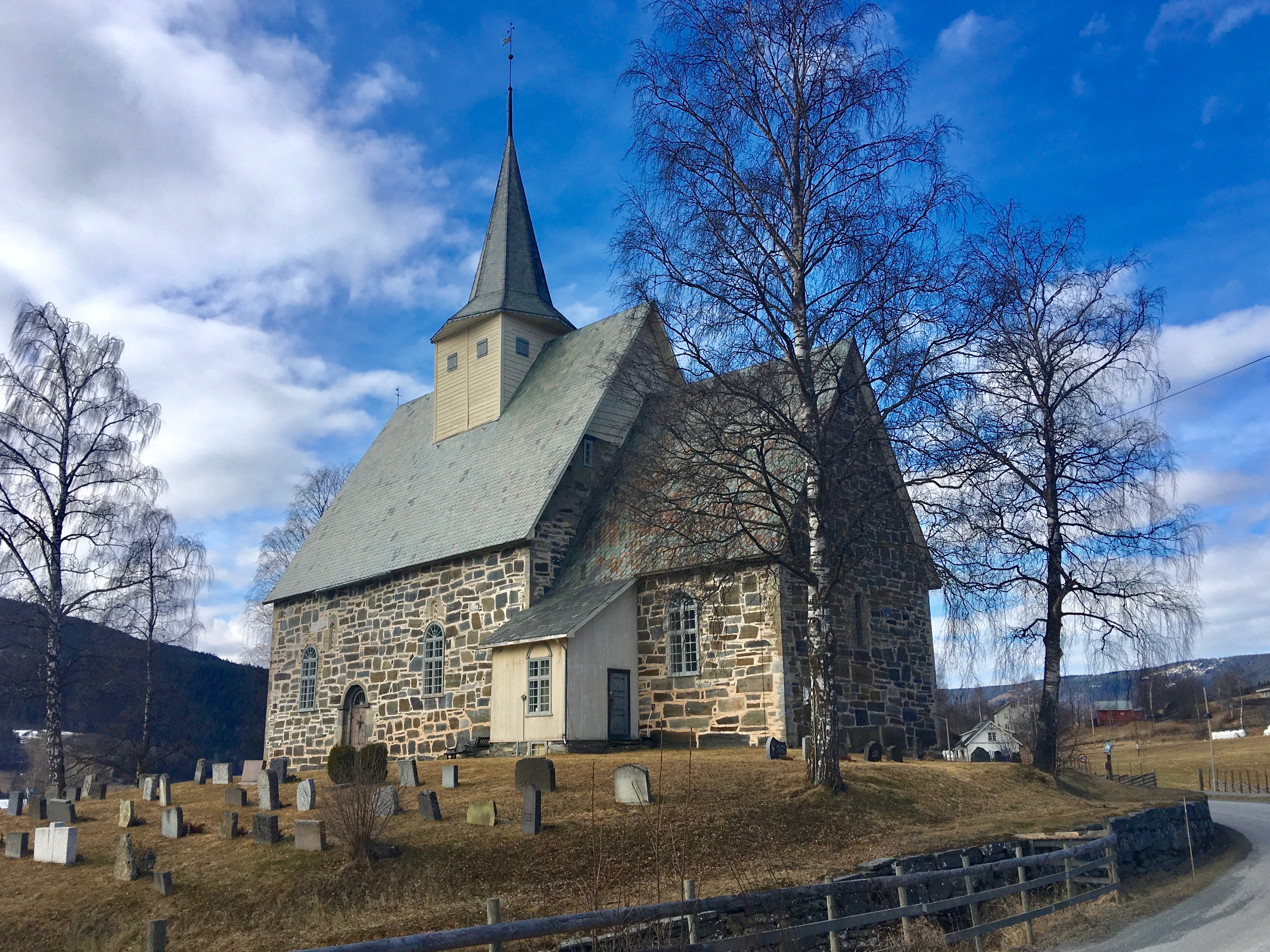

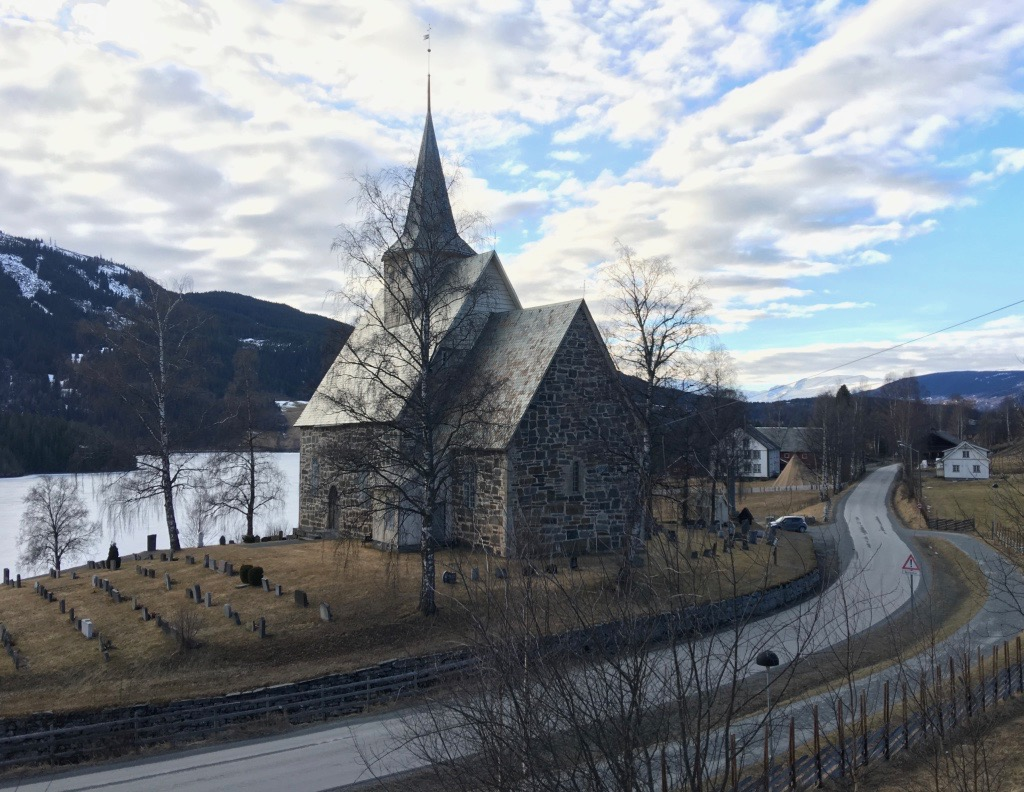

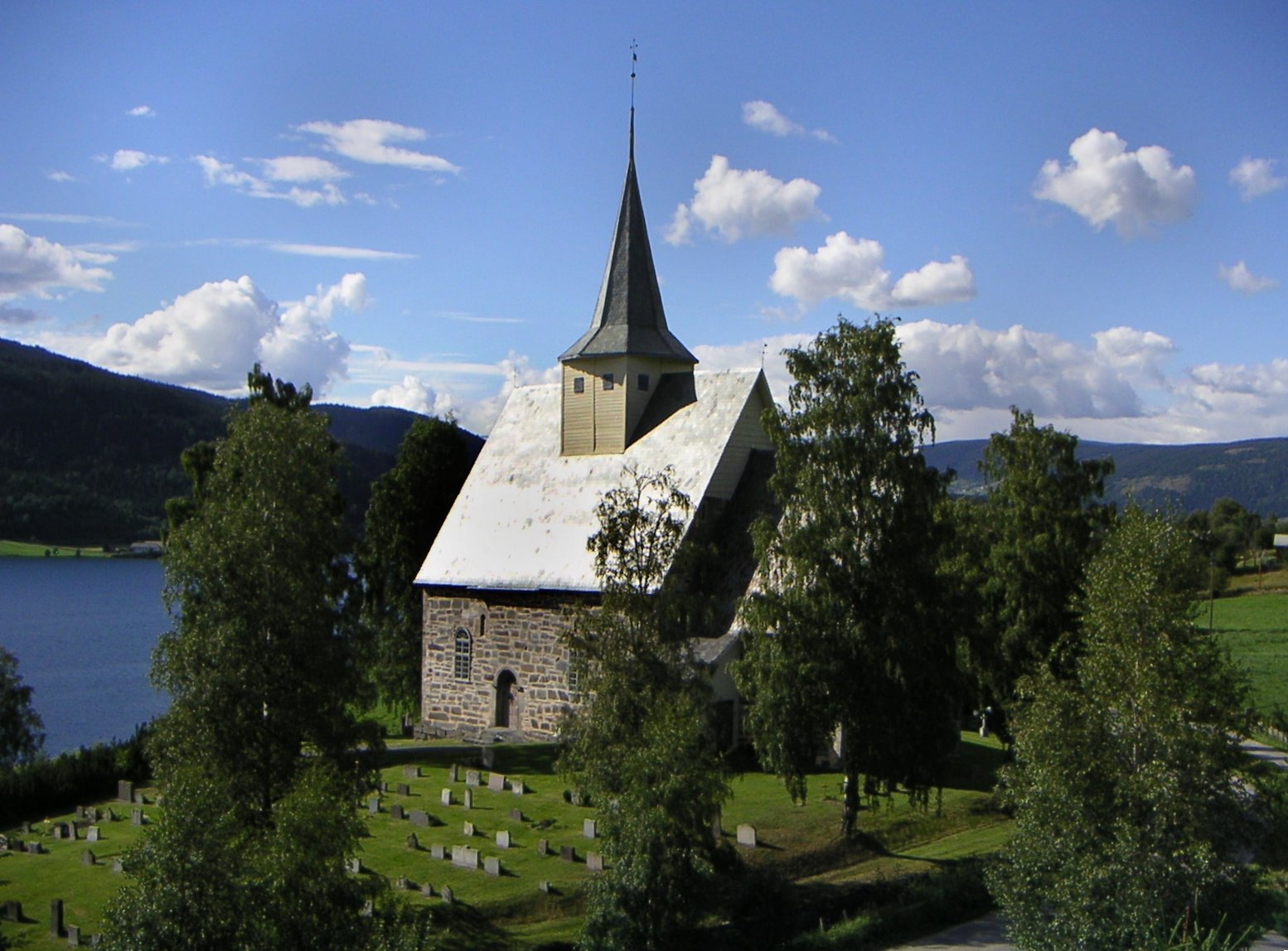

== See also ==
- List of churches in Hamar
