= Ole Brandt =

Norwegian farmer and politician

Ole Brandt (4 January 1818 – 4 August 1880) was a Norwegian farmer and politician.

He graduated from Asker Seminary in 1837. He moved to his native Slidre Municipality (present-day Vestre Slidre Municipality) in 1839 and settled at the farm Løken. He served as mayor of Vestre Slidre Municipality from 1849 to 1855 and again from 1860.

He was elected to the Parliament of Norway in 1859. He was later re-elected in 1862, then missed one term. He was elected in 1868, then missed another term before serving as a deputy representative in 1874-1876 winning one last election in 1876. He represented the constituency of Christians Amt.
