= Einang Sound =

Strait in Innlandet, Norway

- Einangsundet (Norwegian)
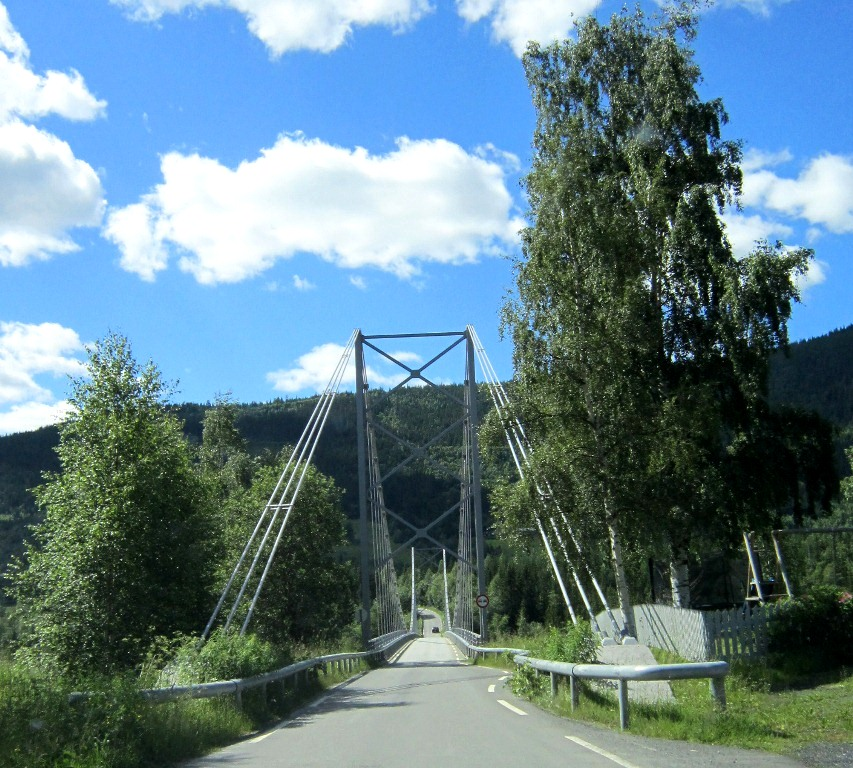
- View of the Einang Sound Bridge over the Einangsundet
- Interactive map of the lake
- Location: Vestre Slidre Municipality, Innlandet
- Coordinates: 61.07285°N 8.99182°E
- Type: Strait
- Basin countries: Norway
- Max. width: 150 metres (490 ft)

The Einang Sound (English) or Einangsundet (Norwegian) is a small strait in the middle of the Slidrefjorden in Vestre Slidre Municipality in Innlandet county, Norway. It is about 150 meters (490 ft) wide.

== Crossing ==
The strait is crossed by Norwegian County Road 261 via the Einang Sound Bridge (Norwegian: Einangsundet bru), which was built in 1963. Before that, a cable ferry operated at the site. The ferry was important for moving people and animals across the sound to and from farms. The cable was anchored to two concrete pillars, both of which are still standing. The ferry, the cable, and various accessories are now on display at the Valdres Folk Museum in Fagernes. The Einang stone stands just to the east, above the sound.
