= Gardberg site =

Archaeological site in Norway

Coordinates: 61°5′10″N 9°0′43″E

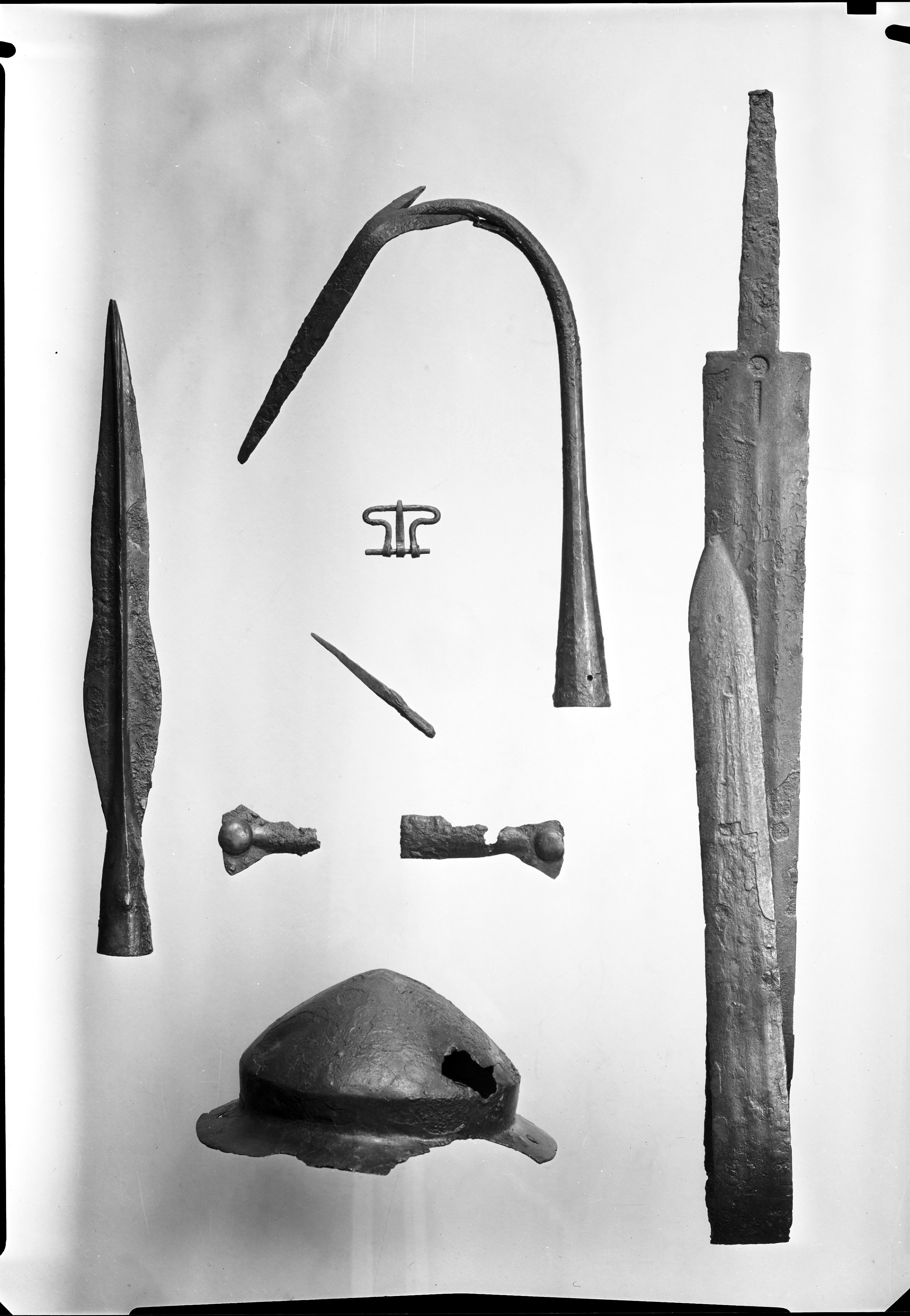
Finds from the Gardberg Site

Gardberg Site (Norwegian: Gardbergfeltet) is an archaeological site located to the northeast of the Einangsundet strait in Vestre Slidre Municipality in Innlandet County, Norway.

== Description ==
Gardberg consists of several burial cairns and clearance cairns as well as areas of early industry and farming. It is the location of about 550 burial mounds dating from the Roman Iron Age and the Viking Age. Investigations have established that the site was inhabited beginning in the Stone Age. Situated on one of the bigger burial mounds is the Einang stone (Norwegian: Einangsteinen), estimated to c. AD 300.

== Access ==
The combined site of Gardberg and the Einang stone covers more than 2 square kilometers (0.77 sq mi) and is accessible from spring through autumn. The attraction is located in the traditional district of Valdres and is managed by the Valdres Museum which is based in Fagernes.

== See also ==
- Vestre Slidre Municipality
- Viking Age
- Roman Iron Age
