= Einang stone =

4th-century runestone in Norway

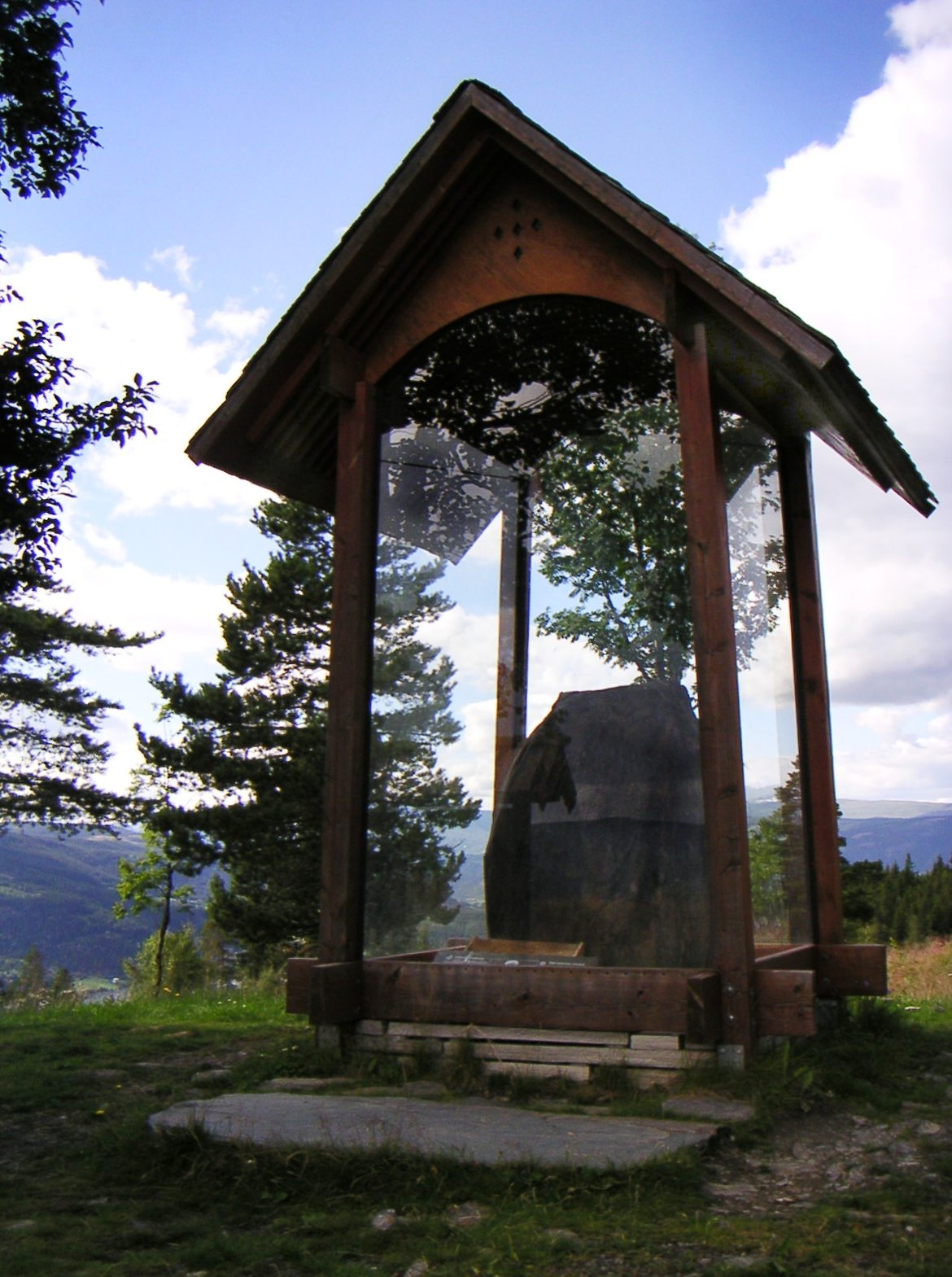
- Writing: Elder Futhark
- Created: 4th century
- Discovered: 1938; Fagernes, Valdres, Norway
- Discovered by: Erik Moltke
- Present location: Innlandet, Norway
- Culture: Norse
- Runemaster: Gudgjest

Text – Native
- Proto-Norse: (Ek go)ðagastiz runo faihido

Translation
- (I, Go)dguest inscribed the runes

The Einang stone (Norwegian: Einangsteinen, N KJ63) is a runestone located to the northeast of the Einangsundet strait near the village of Slidre in Vestre Slidre Municipality in Innlandet county, Norway. The stone is notable for the age of its runic inscription. The Einang runestone is located within the extensive Gardberg site. It is placed on a grave mound on a ridge overlooking the Valdres valley. There are several other grave mounds nearby. Today the runestone is protected by glass walls and a roof.

== Description ==
The Einang stone bears an Elder Futhark inscription, written from right to left, in Proto-Norse that has been dated to the 4th century. It is the oldest runestone still standing at its original location, and it may be the earliest inscription to mention the word runo 'rune'. Here the word appears in the singular. Additionally, the verb used in the inscription for the act of inscribing is faihido, which literally means 'painted'. This may mean that the inscription was originally highlighted with paint.

== Inscription ==
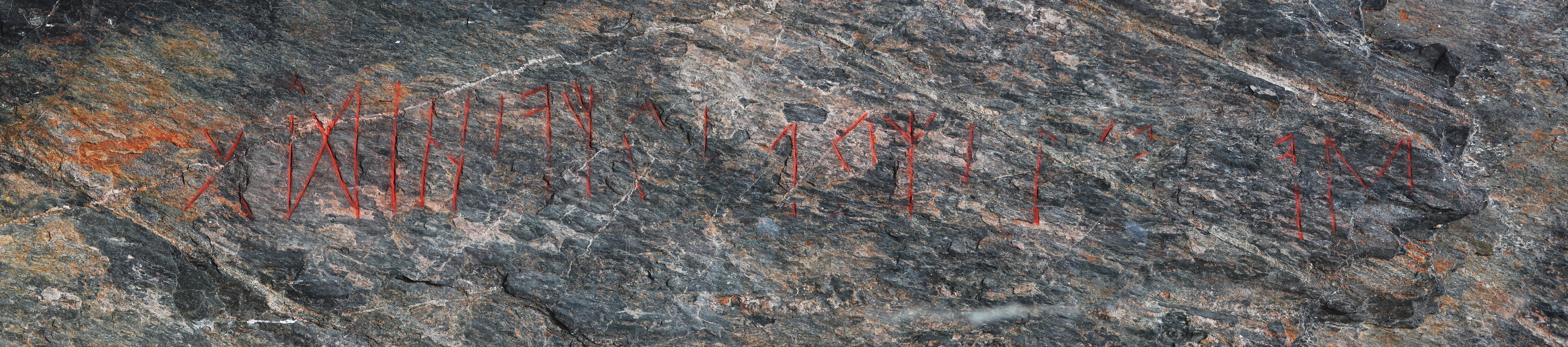
The inscription on the Einang stone

The generally accepted reading of the inscription was proposed by Erik Moltke in 1938. He conjectured that there had been four runes in the original inscription, before the first rune which is visible today. The reading is:

Transcription and translation of the inscription
Runic text	English translation
(Ek go)ðagastiz runo faihido	(I, Go)dguest painted/wrote this runic inscription.

As the stone is placed on a grave mound, it is natural to interpret it as a tombstone. Why the inscription does not name the buried person, but only the carver of the runes, remains an open question.

== See also ==
- List of runestones
