= Røn =

Village in Vestre Slidre Municipality, Norway

- Village
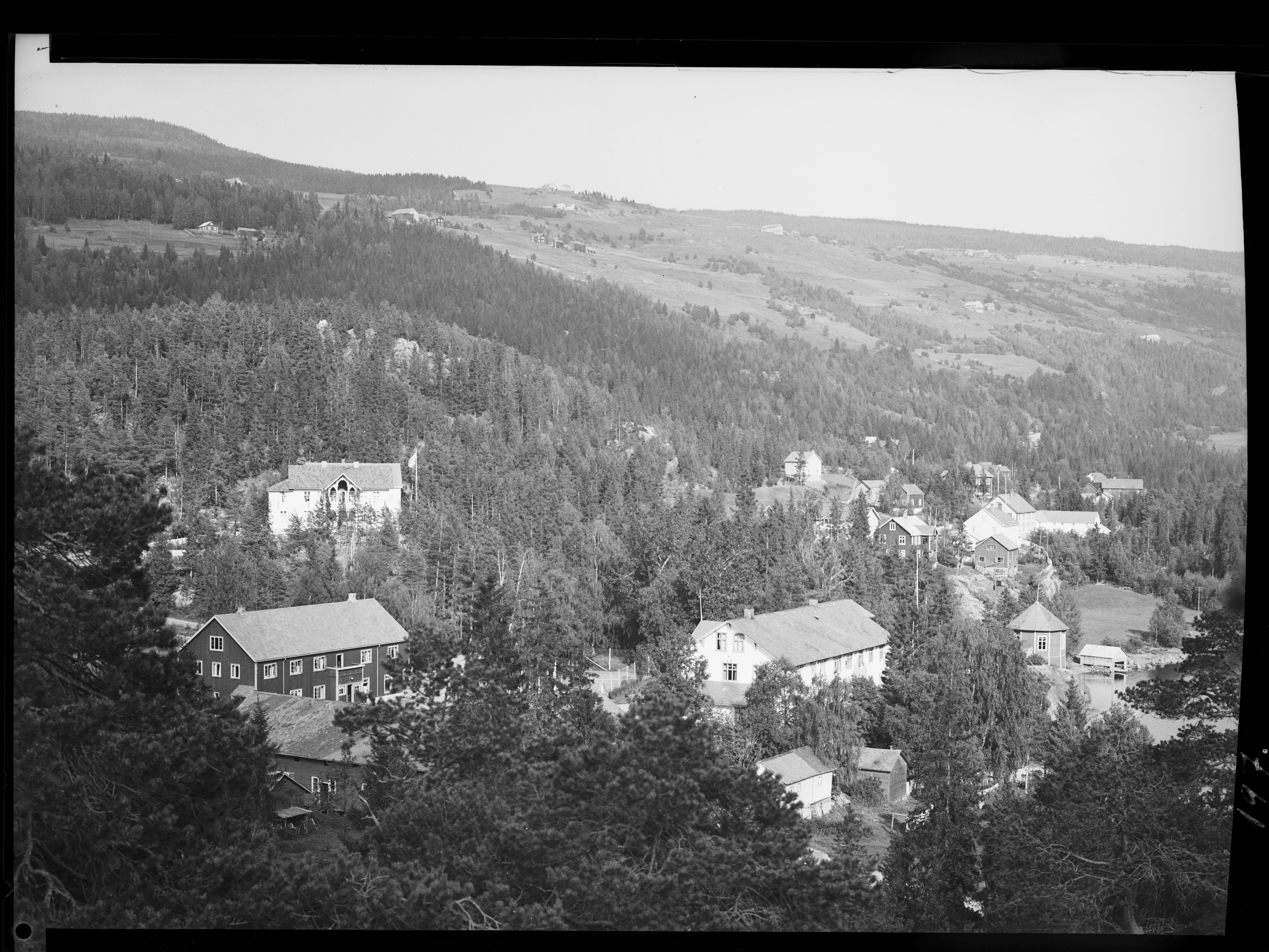
- View of the village (c. 1950)
- Interactive map of Røn
- Location within Innlandet Location within Norway
- Coordinates: 61.03328°N 9.05643°E
- Country: Norway
- Region: Eastern Norway
- County: Innlandet
- District: Valdres
- Municipality: Vestre Slidre Municipality

Area
  - Total: 0.48 km^{2} (0.19 sq mi)
- Elevation: 368 m (1,207 ft)

Population (2024)
  - Total: 274
  - Density: 571/km^{2} (1,480/sq mi)
- Time zone: UTC+01:00 (CET)
  - Summer (DST): UTC+02:00 (CEST)
- Post Code: 2960 Røn

Røn is a village in Vestre Slidre Municipality in Innlandet county, Norway. The village is located where the Slidrefjorden and the Strondafjorden meet, about 8 kilometres (5.0 mi) south of the village of Slidre. The European route E16 highway runs through the village.

The 0.48-square-kilometre (120-acre) village has a population (2024) of 274 and a population density of 571 inhabitants per square kilometre (1,480/sq mi).
