= Clearance cairn =

Mound of stones cleared from an agricultural field

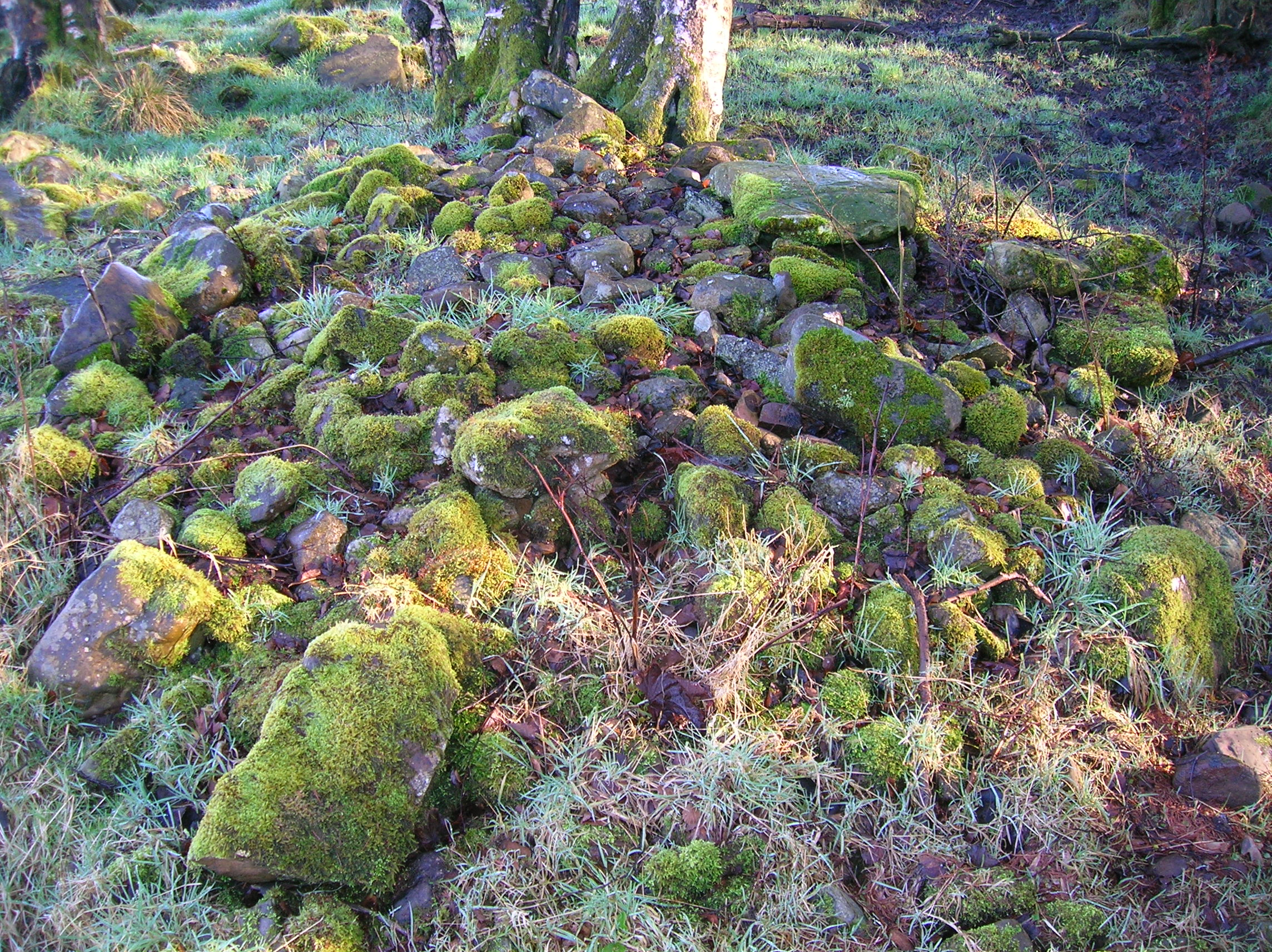
A typical clearance cairn from Eglinton Country Park in Scotland

A clearance cairn is an irregular and unstructured collection of fieldstones which have been removed from arable land or pasture to allow for more effective agriculture and collected into a usually low mound or cairn. Commonly of Bronze Age origins, these cairns may be part of a cairnfield (a collection of closely spaced cairns) where some cairns might be funerary. Clearance cairns are a worldwide phenomenon wherever organised agriculture has been practised.

== Purpose of clearance ==
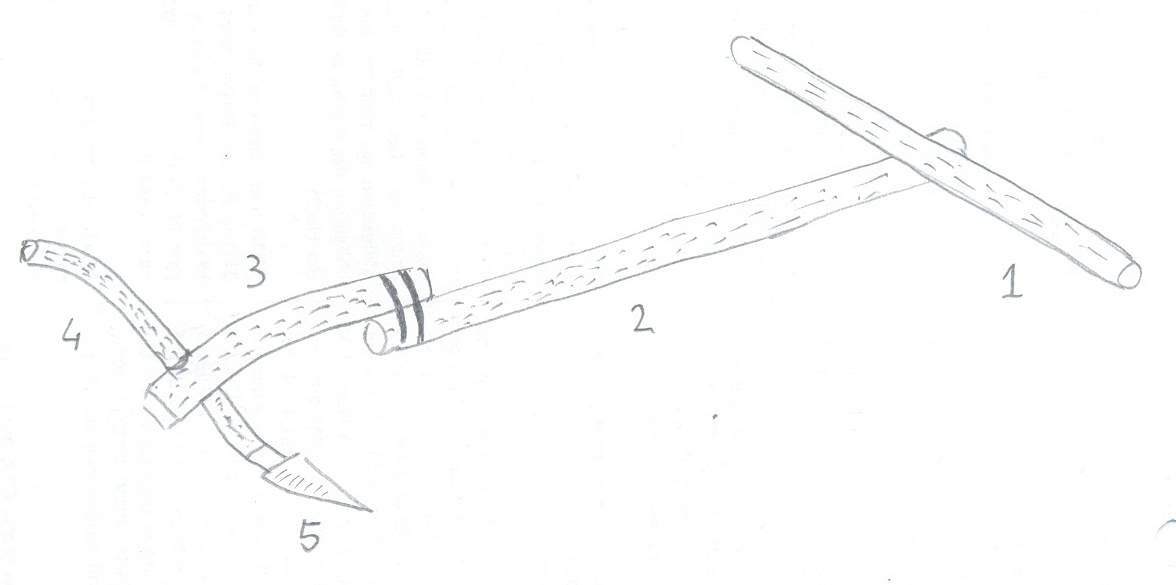
Single-handled ard

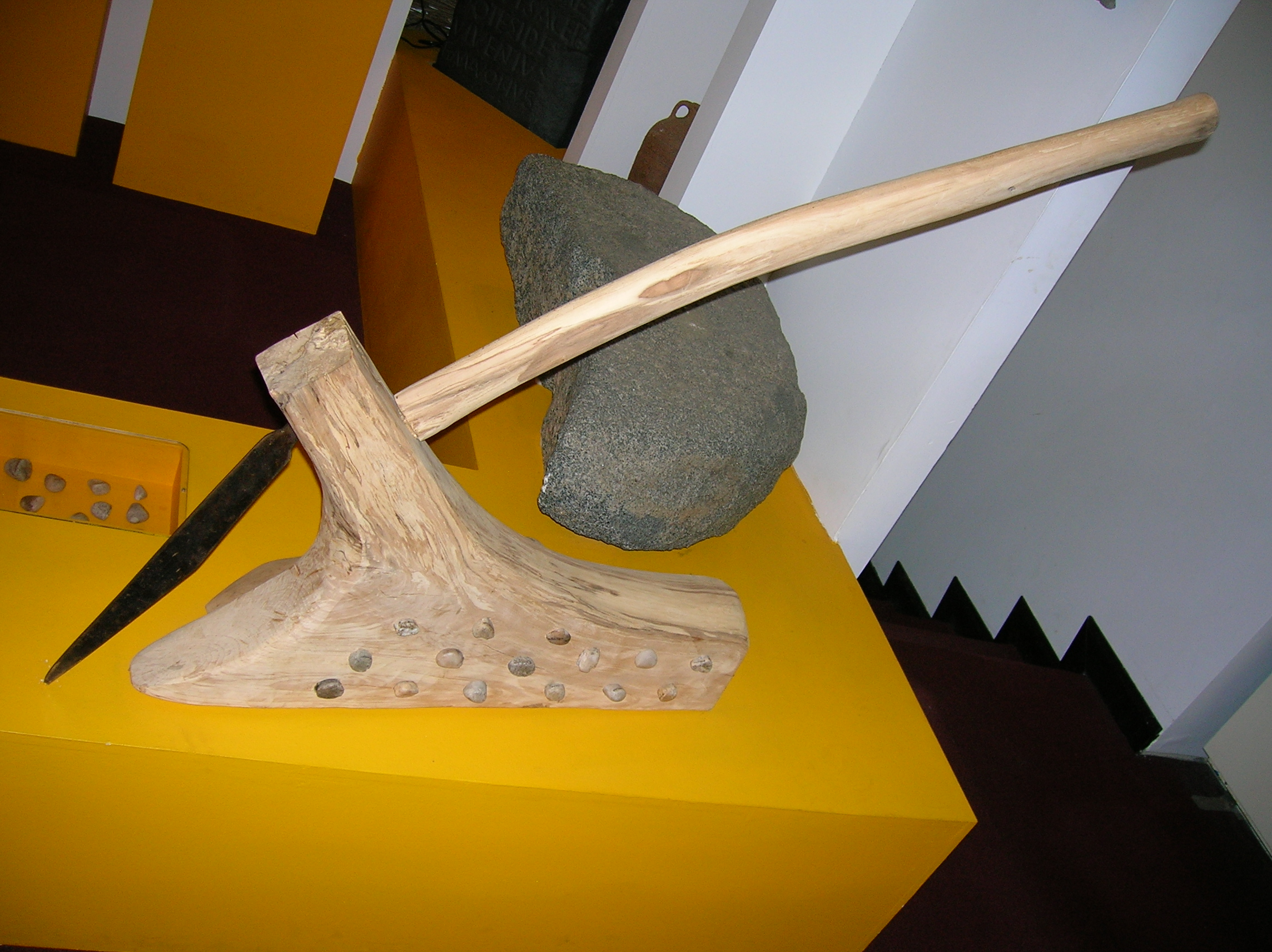
A reconstructed mould board plough.

By removing large and moderate size stones from the surface and sub-surface, ploughing can take place with much less potential damage taking place to the plough blade. Stones also prevent the growth of plants where they physically block access to the soil and their removal allows for a greater surface area for crops to grow and to allow for plants to grow to their full potential; Stones also increase drainage and may therefore deprive plants of moisture. Stones were removed from fields to allow for the efficient use of hand tools, animal powered machines on such fields in the past and for tractors, etc. in more recent times. Some prehistoric clearance cairns may also contain burials. A few clearance cairns may have been additionally created as boundary markers. As ploughing developed and specialised the greater depth tilled and the increased power of mechanised ploughing resulted in more and larger stones being brought to the surface and these too had to be removed.

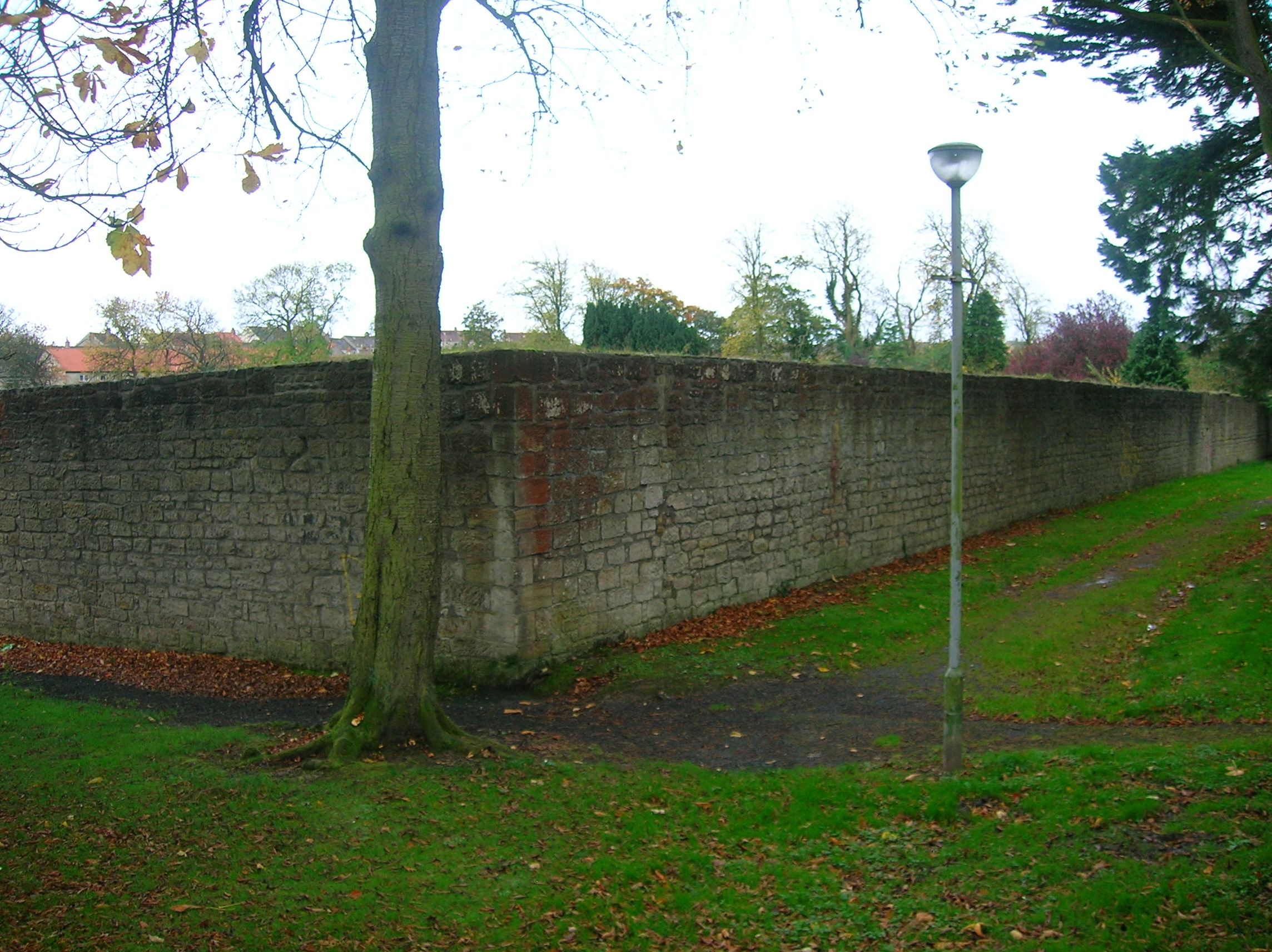
A typical walled garden where the stone acts as a slow release radiator

Field clearance cairns sometimes survive long after cleared fields have fallen out of use and are often the only surviving evidence of past agricultural activity in areas of woodland, upland areas, etc. The existence of these cairns was once regarded as suggesting pastoral farming. Many now consider them the result of arable or mixed agricultural exploitation enabling ploughing or hand tillage to work more efficiently.

=== Heat radiation ===
Cairns built in the middle of enclosures can maximize the effect of daytime radiance, since reradiating absorbed sunlight from the stones raises nighttime field temperatures (very slightly) as in walled gardens. Since this effect would encourage crop growth (and potentially reduce the risk of frost) it may have been deliberately intended, though there is no direct evidence that cairns were built for this purpose.

== Creation ==
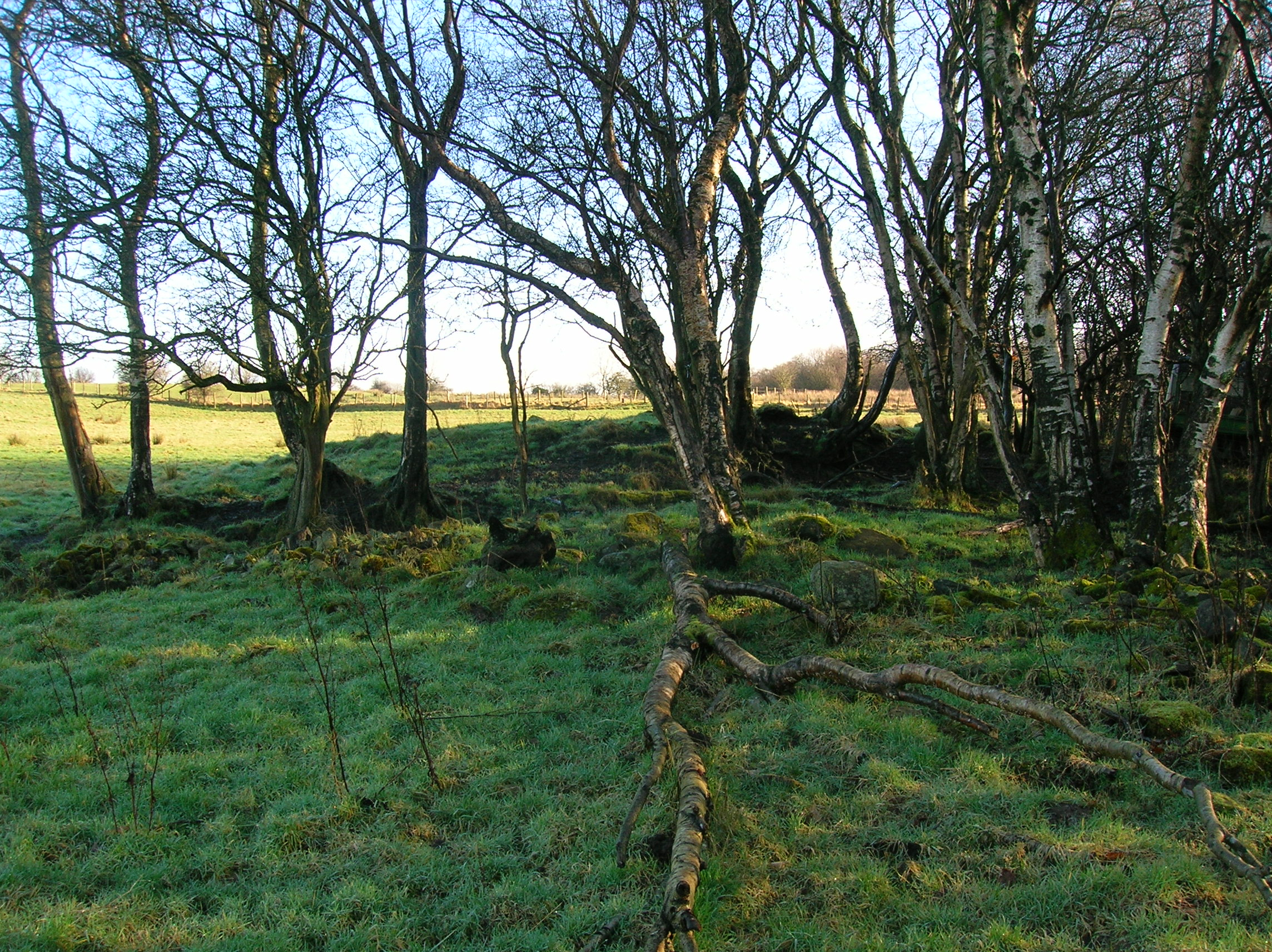
A mound associated with a bog-wood and a clearance cairn at Eglinton Country Park.

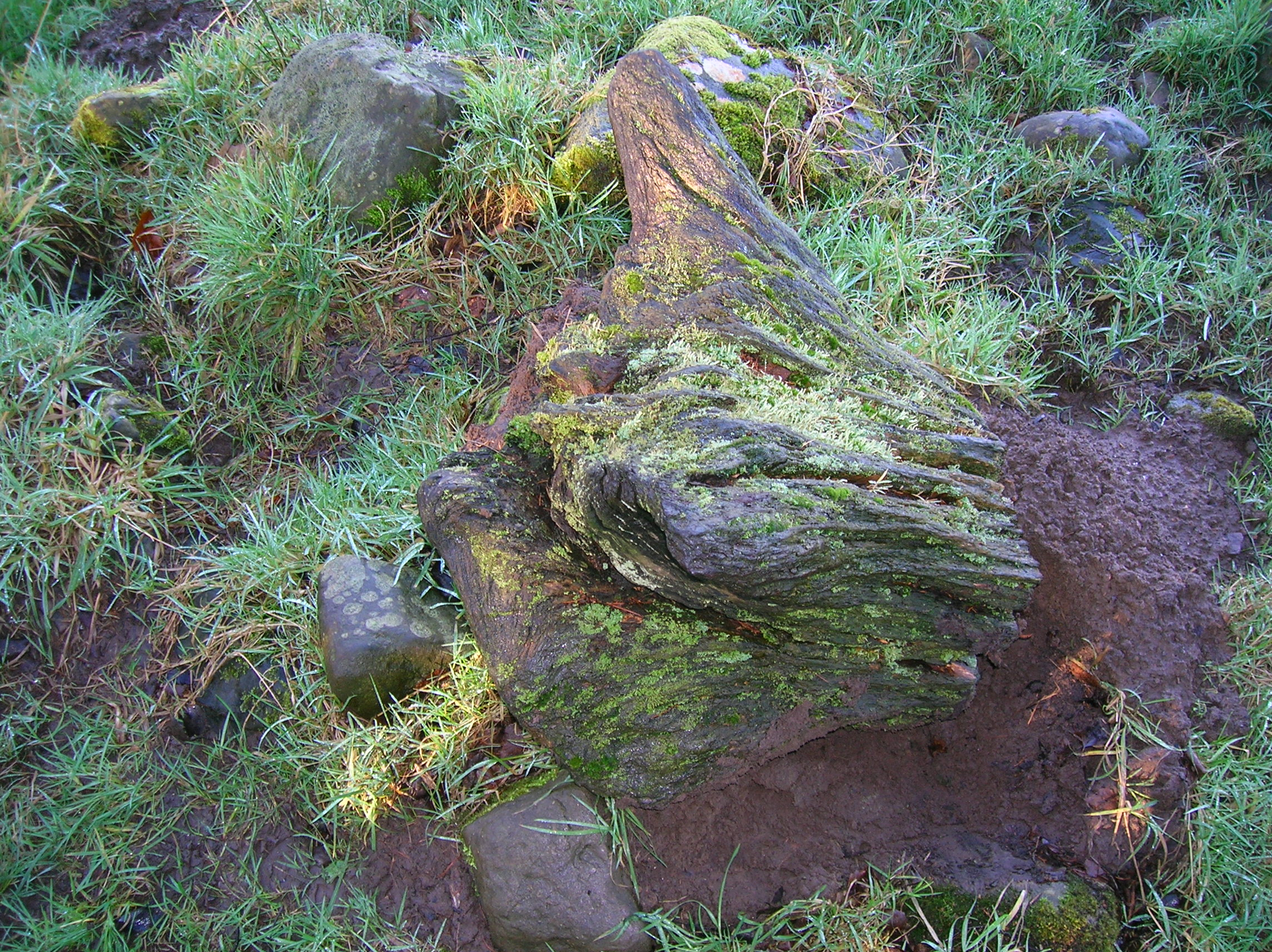
Bog-wood associated with a clearance cairn.

Many clearance stones were used in the construction of defensive structures, houses, farm buildings, walls, drainage ditches, road metalling, etc. Where permanent clearance cairns were formed it was predominately on waste land, such as steep slopes, edges of woodland, field corners, and around earth-fast boulders.

The amount of stone which needed to be cleared from a field depended upon geology, glacial deposits, glacial erratics, etc. Many cairns are mainly composed of stones which could have been carried by a single person who would have followed the plough as it turned up small boulders, etc. Most surviving cairns are from the Bronze Age but some are considerably older, because field clearance has been practised since the beginnings of agriculture in the Stone Age (such as at the Gardberg site in Vestre Slidre Municipality, Innlandet, Norway).

== Characteristics ==
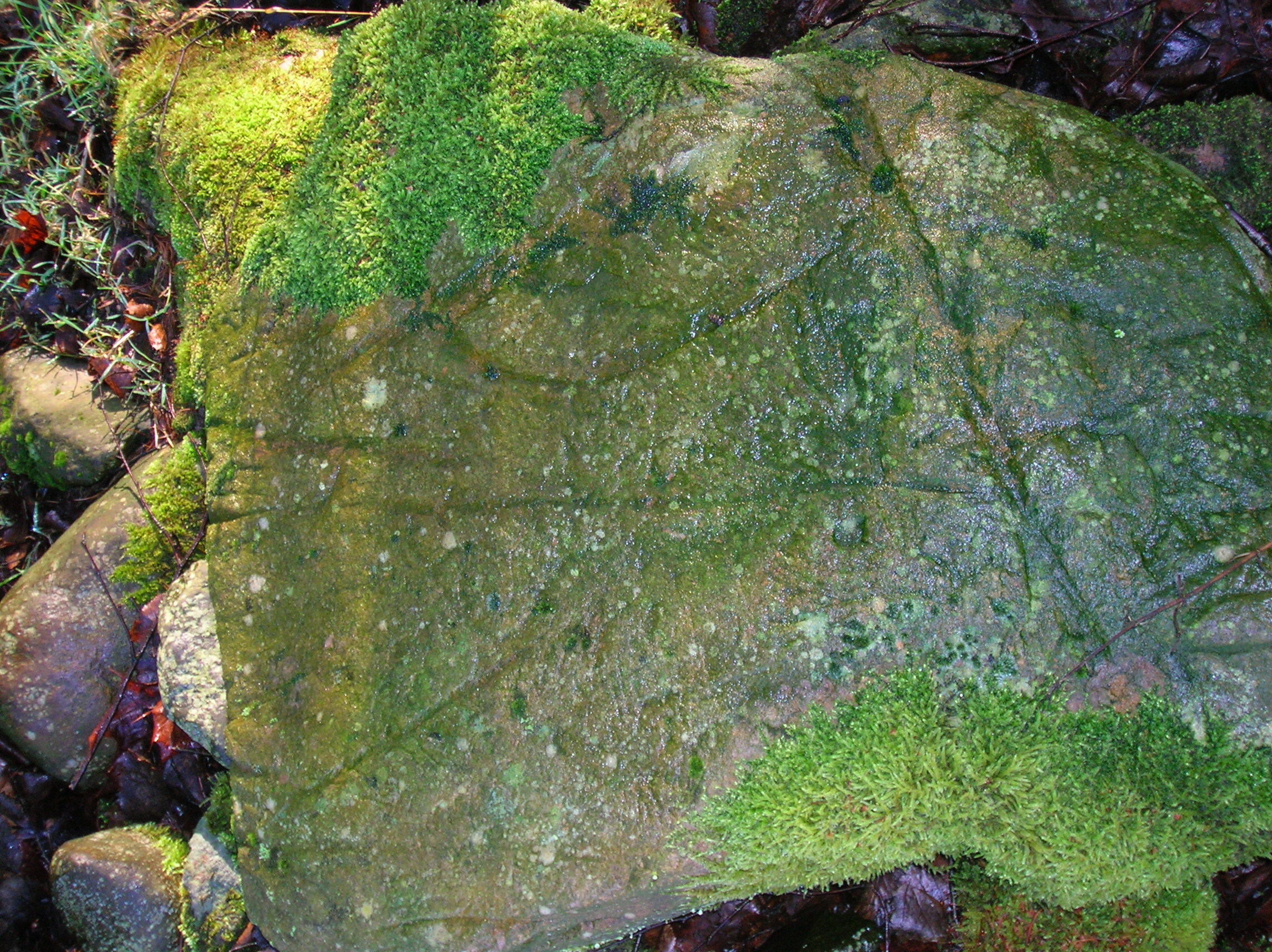
Ard or plough-marks on a boulder in a clearance cairn

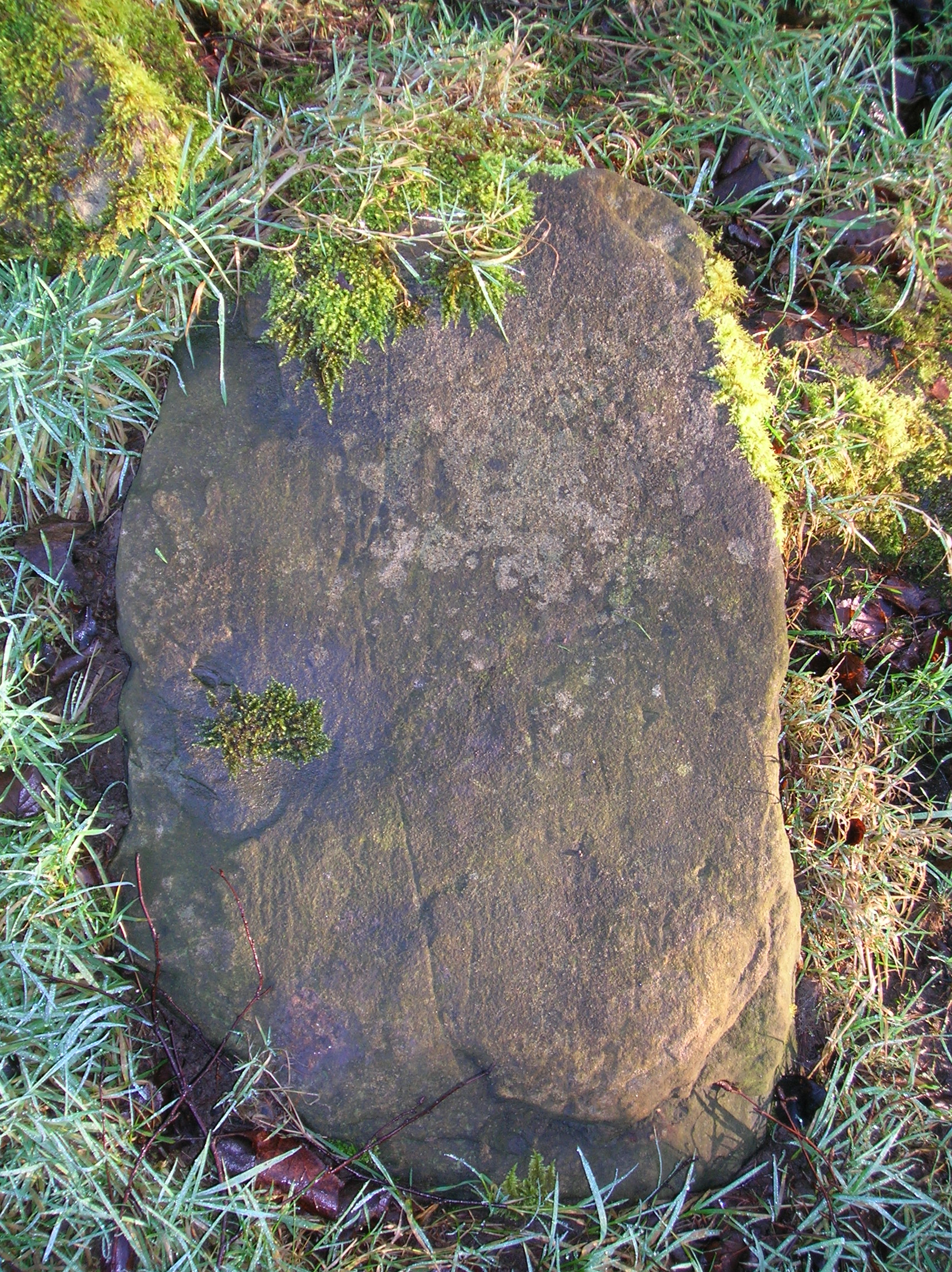
Ard-marks on a boulder in a clearance cairn at Eglinton Country Park

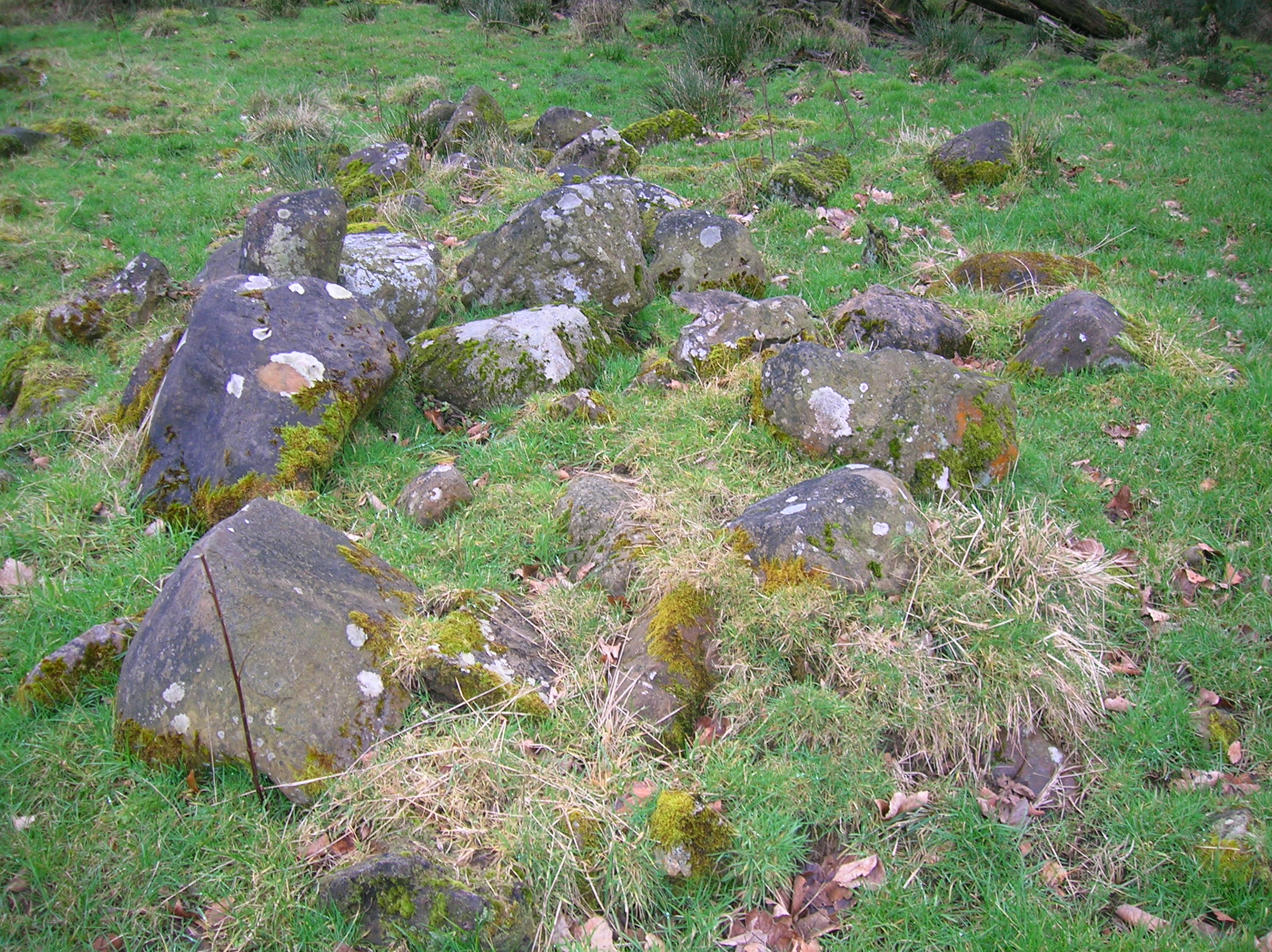
A clearance cairn formed using mechanised extraction

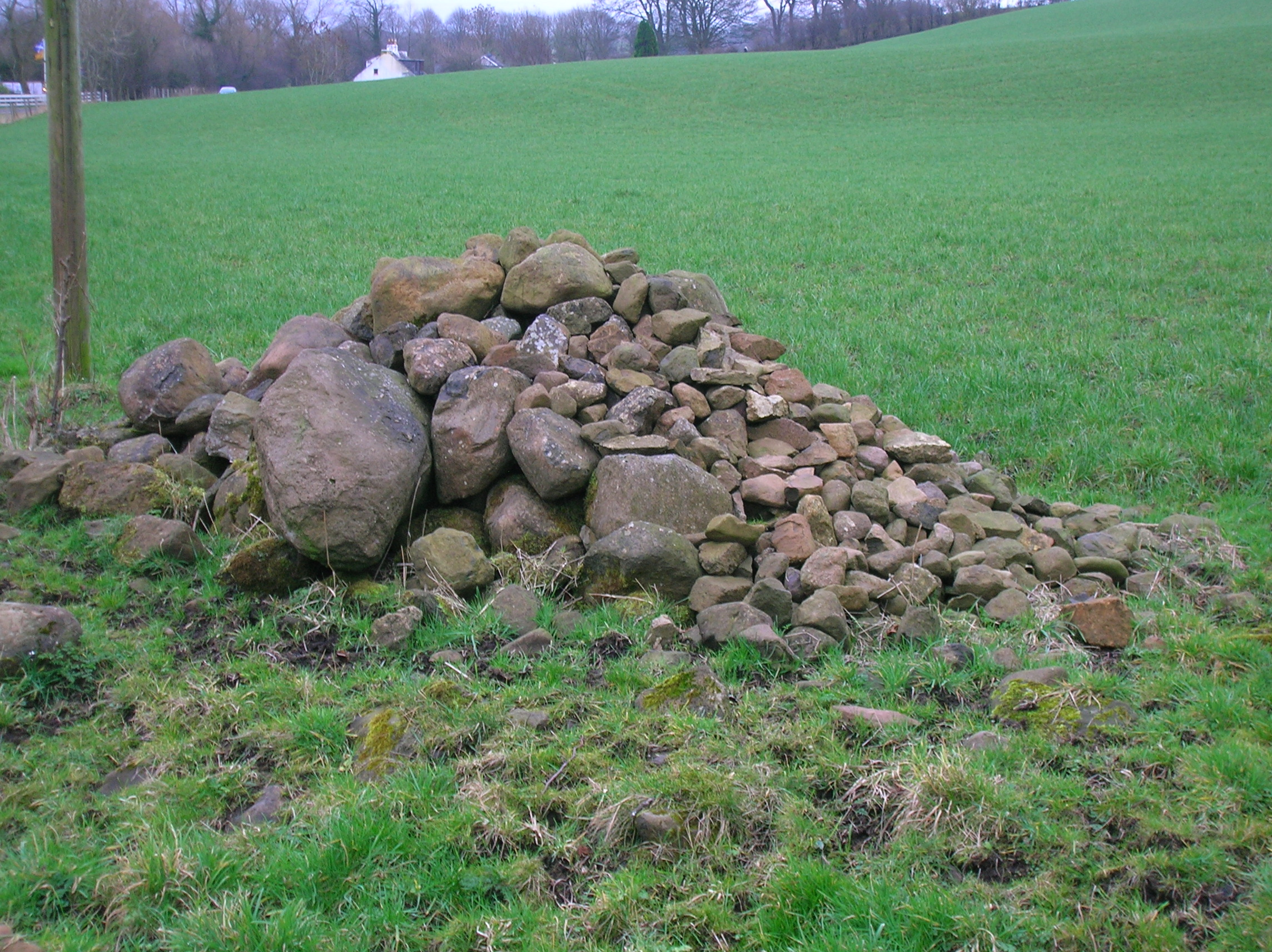
A recent clearance cairn devoid of lichen and moss growth

Cairns may be discrete, in large groups (cairnfields) or as linear formations—linear cairns. Many stones in clearance cairns show plough-marks or ard-marks at various angles to each other, typical of the Bronze Age ploughing methods. These ard-marks indicate that the boulders were obstructing the ploughing process and were in situ for some time before removal.

Other items such as bog-wood and grubbed out tree stumps were sometimes added to the cairns as a result of tree felling and the process of creation of pasture from woodland. Bog-wood stumps and trunks can be thousands of years old, are darker in colour due to the tannins from the peat and do not show typical wood decomposition characteristics due to their preservation within peat bogs. The absence of saw marks indicates felling using axes, providing further information about the age of the wood involved.

Some clearance cairns are linear in form. Many of the smaller cairns were probably created by family groups, whilst larger ones would have required organised labour.

Cairnfields have on occasions been confused with various other classes of monuments, such as round barrow cemeteries and groups of round barrows, stone hut circles, ring cairns, or burnt mounds. In general round barrows are larger, more regular, and may contain visible traces of a cist or kerb; stone hut circles have distinct entrances; ring cairns have a hollow centre; and burnt mounds contain a high proportion of fire-crazed stones of rather smaller size than appear in the average clearance cairns within cairnfields.

Natural deposits such as so called 'clitter agglomerates', moraines can also on occasion look rather similar to groups of clearance cairns, but their context, position and regular form usually betrays their true origins.

Clearance cairn material is often heterogeneous, typically consisting of both edged and rounded small stones, sometimes mixed with sand, clay or silt, lifted from the field nearby. Agricultural and clearance cairns are sometimes located on slopes, whilst burial cairns rarely are.

Clearance cairns constructed using mechanised methods with horse or motor powered assistance may appear superficially similar, however the stones are generally much larger and they are more randomly tipped rather than hand placed.

== Natural history ==
Due to the age and 'abandoned' state of many clearance cairns, they are often good sites for the growth and survival of lichens, mosses, ferns and other plants; the actual species being dependent on the rock type. Cairns are relatively undisturbed and emulate old walls for the micro-habitats they produce.

== Landscape history ==
In some areas which are now unproductive moorland, aerial photographs show the presence of numerous prehistoric clearance cairns and associated dwellings such as hut-circles. This clear evidence of previous ancient habitation and cultivation shows that the climate worsened until the farmers were forced to move to lower ground.

== Stone carrying ==
Stone carry or the stone walk is a traditional Scottish athletic event involving the carrying of large stones down the field of competition; the competitors pick up two heavy stones with iron handles, and carry the pair as far as they can. The sport may have grown out of the act of clearing stones from fields to create pastures and arable land.

== See also ==
- Stone picker
- Fieldstone
