= Ola Bøe =

Norwegian musician (1910–1986)

Ola Bøe (July 10, 1910 – September 7, 1986) was a Norwegian fiddler.

Ola Bøe was born in Vestre Slidre Municipality in Christians amt (county), Norway, the son of Per Person Bøe (1859–1922) and Rangdi Jakobsdotter (1867–1934). His father played the Hardanger fiddle but died when Ola was twelve years old. As a result, he learned many tunes from his mother, who was good at humming dance tunes. He also learned tunes from his elder brother Jørgen (1904–1986), and considered himself a student of Andris Øde, Alf Moe, and Olav Moe.

Bøe moved to Oslo in 1935 and soon became an important fiddler in the folk music scene there. For many years, he regularly played with the Valdres Fiddling Group (Norwegian: Valdreslaget) and was also active in the Folk Music Association (Norwegian: Laget for folkemusikk). The fiddlers that came to learn from him included Bernt Balchen Jr., Trygve Bolstad, and Harald Røine. He had a personal style of playing, and often used a homemade fiddle. He was considered a very talented dance fiddler, although it could take some time for him to really get warmed up. He knew many old tunes played using less common tunings, and he played in an older style. He also used a fingering technique that was difficult to imitate.

He won the national fiddling competition (Norwegian: Landskappleiken) held at Geilo in 1969, playing a fiddle that he had borrowed from Odd Bakkerud. Bøe played extensively for the Norwegian Broadcasting Corporation (NRK) from 1953 onward, and there are many recordings of his playing. He was made an honorary member of the Folk Music Association and received the Vestre Slidre cultural award in 1982.

Bøe resided at Nadderud and died in Bærum Municipality.
