= Berit Skjefte =

Norwegian musician

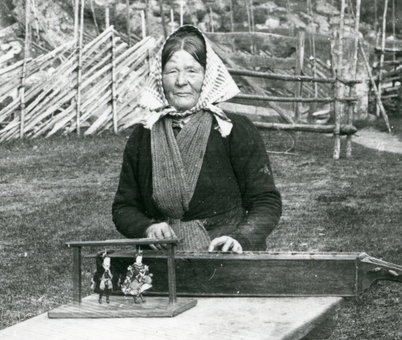
Berit Skjefte with her langeleik and dancing dolls

Berit Tørrisdatter Skjefte Pynten, also Berit på Pynte or Berit Pynte, (c. 1809–1899) played the traditional Norwegian zither-like instrument, the langeleik. A native of Vestre Slidre in the Valdres district, she became known throughout Norway for her exceptionally skilled performances and her accompanying dancing dolls. The composers Edvard Grieg and Ludvig Mathias Lindeman were each inspired by her playing. Three of her instruments have been preserved in the Ringve Museum in Trondheim.

== Early life ==
Berit Tørrisdatter was born around the year 1809 in what is now Vestre Slidre Municipality in Innlandet county, Norway. She was the daughter of the soldier and farmer Tørris Toresen (born 1772) and his wife Marit née Gjermundsdatter (born 1778). Brought up on the Gryte farm, she married the farmer and surveyor Andris Andrissen Skjefte (born 1804). It was rumoured that for five pots of liquor, they were able to take over the house known as Pynten located next to the main road to Vestlandet.

== Career ==
While her husband was away hunting reindeer, Berit Skeifte stayed at home, collecting fees for playing her langeleik. Pynten was a convenient resting place for the many Norwegian and foreign tourists travelling on the main road to Bergen. Skeifte had the good business sense to encourage drivers to stop there, allowing their clients to enjoy the music of "Berit på Pynte". Later in the year, when the tourist season was over, she performed in Oslo, Bergen, and Sogn, not only earning good money but gaining the status of one of the celebrities of Norwegian folk music.

In 1865, when Lindeman was collecting folk music, he visited Berit Skjefte and recorded 16 of the pieces she played. When Grieg passed by in the 1880s, he noted "the public's irresistible desire to come into contact with Berit på Pynte". An added attraction to her playing were her finely attired dancing dolls, controlled by fine threads attached to their joints.

Three of Skiefte's instruments can be seen in Trondheim's Ringve Museum.

Berit Skjefte died in Vang i Valdres on 19 December 1899.
