= Slidre Municipality =

Former municipality in Oppland, Norway

Slidre Municipality Slidre herred
- Former municipality
- Slidre within Christians amt
- Coordinates: 61°05′17″N 8°58′53″E
- Country: Norway
- County: Christians amt
- District: Valdres
- Established: 1 Jan 1838
  - Created as: Formannskapsdistrikt
- Disestablished: 1 Jan 1849
  - Succeeded by: Vestre Slidre Municipality and Øystre Slidre Municipality
- Administrative centre: Slidre

Government
  - Mayor (1847–1848): Rønjus Nordtorp

Area (upon dissolution)
  - Total: 1,422 km^{2} (549 sq mi)
  - Land: 1,298 km^{2} (501 sq mi)
  - Water: 124 km^{2} (48 sq mi) 8.7%
- Highest elevation: 2,010.66 m (6,596.7 ft)

Population (1849)
  - Total: 5,536
  - Density: 4.265/km^{2} (11.05/sq mi)
- Demonym: Slidring
- Time zone: UTC+01:00 (CET)
  - Summer (DST): UTC+02:00 (CEST)
- ISO 3166 code: NO-0543

Slidre is a former municipality in the old Oppland county, Norway. The 1,422-square-kilometre (549 sq mi) municipality existed from 1838 until its dissolution in 1849. The area is now divided between Vestre Slidre Municipality and Øystre Slidre Municipality in the traditional district of Valdres. The administrative centre was the village of Slidre. Other villages in the municipality included Beitostølen, Hegge, Heggenes, Lomen, Moane, Rogne, Røn, Skammestein, and Volbu.

== General information ==
The prestegjeld of Slidre was established as a civil municipality on 1 January 1838 (see formannskapsdistrikt law). The municipality did not exist very long. On 1 January 1849, the municipality was divided into Vestre Slidre Municipality (population: 3,130) and Øystre Slidre Municipality (population: 2,406).

=== Name ===
The municipality (originally the parish) is named after the old Slidre farm (Old Norse: Slíðrar or Slíðrir) since the historic Slidre Church was built there during the 12th century. The meaning of the name is not definitively known. It may be derived from the word slir which comes from the Old Norse word slíðr which means "sheath" (which is probably referring to a long depression near the church).

=== Churches ===
The Church of Norway had one parish (sokn) within Slidre Municipality. At the time of the municipal dissolution, it was part of the Slidre prestegjeld and the Toten og Valdres prosti (deanery) in the Diocese of Hamar.

Churches in Slidre Municipality
Parish (sokn)	Church name	Location of the church	Year built
Hegge	Hegge Stave Church	Hegge	c. 1216
Lomen	Lomen Stave Church	Lomen	c. 1179
Rogne	Rogne Stave Church	Rogne	1780*
Røn	Røn Church	Røn	1747
Slidre	Slidre Church	Slidre	c. 1200
Volbu	Volbu Church	Volbu	1820
*Note: this church was torn down and replaced in 1857 after Slidre Municipality no longer existed.

== Geography ==
The municipality was surrounded by Vaage Municipality to the north, Fron Municipality to the northeast, Gausdal Municipality to the east, Nordre Aurdal Municipality to the southeast and south, Hemsedal Municipality (in Buskerud county) to the southwest, and Vang Municipality to the west and northwest. The highest point in the municipality was the 2,010.66-metre (6,596.7 ft) tall mountain Øystre Rasletinden located at a tri-point border between Vaage Municipality, Vang Municipality, and Slidre Municipality.

== Government ==
While it existed, Slidre Municipality was governed by a municipal council of directly elected representatives. The mayor was indirectly elected by a vote of the municipal council. The municipality was under the jurisdiction of the Eidsivating Court of Appeal.

=== Mayors ===
The mayor (Norwegian: ordfører) of Slidre Municipality was the political leader of the municipality and the chairperson of the municipal council. The following people have held this position:

- 1838–1839: Gullik Risted
- 1840–1841: Ole G. Berge
- 1842–1842: Haagen P. Semmelinge
- 1843–1844: Georg Prahl Harbitz
- 1845–1845: Rønjus Nordtorp
- 1846–1847: Georg Prahl Harbitz
- 1847–1848: Rønjus Nordtorp

== See also ==
- List of former municipalities of Norway
