= Helin =

Lake in Innlandet, Norway

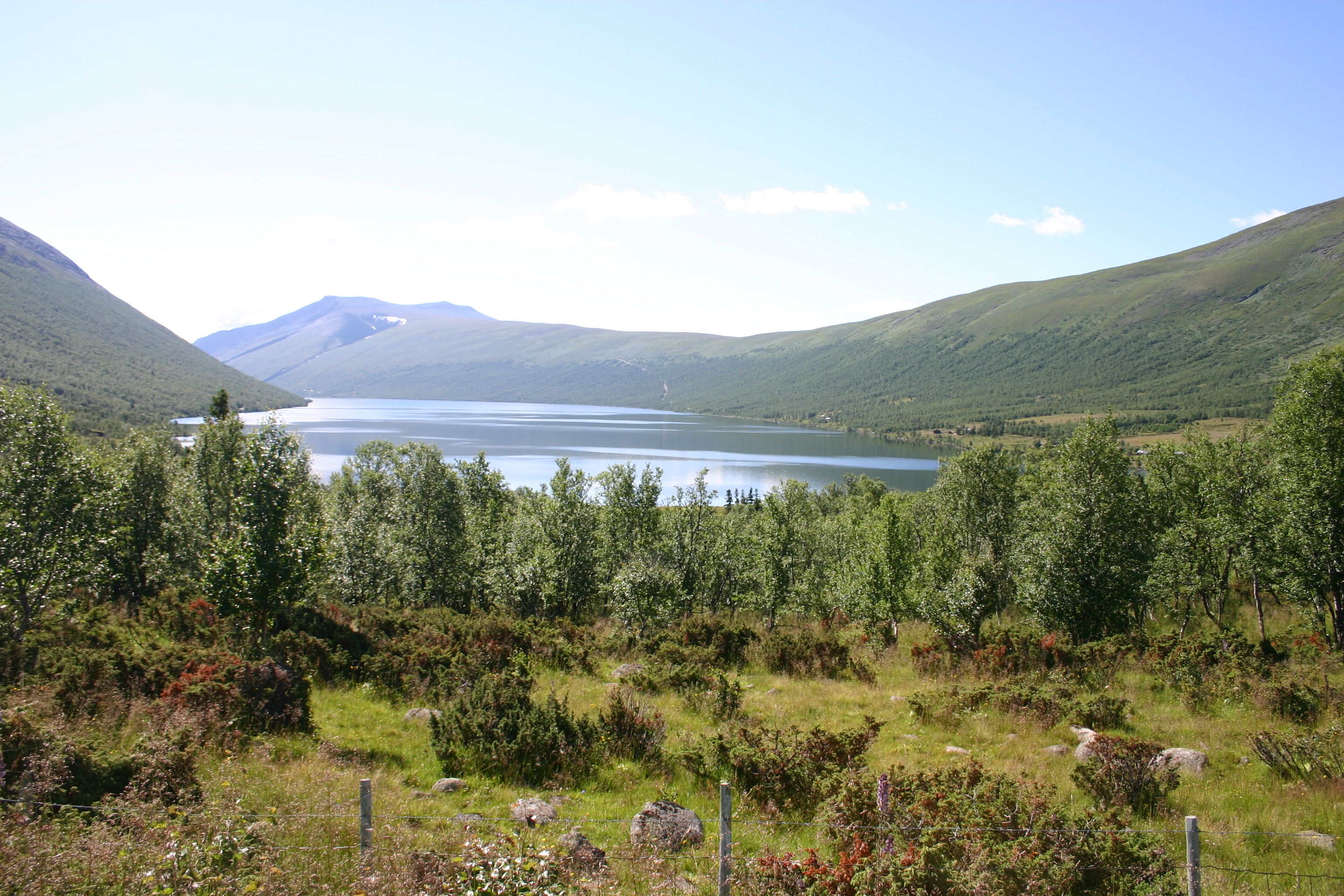
- View of the lake
- Interactive map of the lake
- Location: Vang Municipality, Innlandet
- Coordinates: 61°02′46″N 08°37′57″E
- Basin countries: Norway
- Max. length: 12 kilometres (7.5 mi)
- Max. width: 1.2 kilometres (0.75 mi)
- Surface area: 9.47 km^{2} (3.66 sq mi)
- Max. depth: 87.6 metres (287 ft)
- Water volume: 18.6 million cubic metres (15,100 acre⋅ft)
- Surface elevation: 870 metres (2,850 ft)
- References: NVE

Helin is a lake which lies in Vang Municipality in Innlandet county, Norway. The southeastern shore of the lake forms the municipal border with neighboring Vestre Slidre Municipality. The lake is regulated for power production by the nearby Åbjøra hydroelectric power station.

Helin has an area of 9.47 square kilometres (3.66 sq mi) and its circumference is about 27 kilometres (17 mi). It is located at an elevation of 870 metres (2,850 ft) above sea level and it has a volume of 18,600,000 cubic metres (15,100 acre⋅ft). In 1930, a 35-square-kilometre (14 sq mi) area between the lakes Helin and Syndin (to the northeast) was recognized as a botanical plant park.

== See also ==
- List of lakes in Norway
