= Slidre =

Village in Vestre Slidre, Norway

- Village
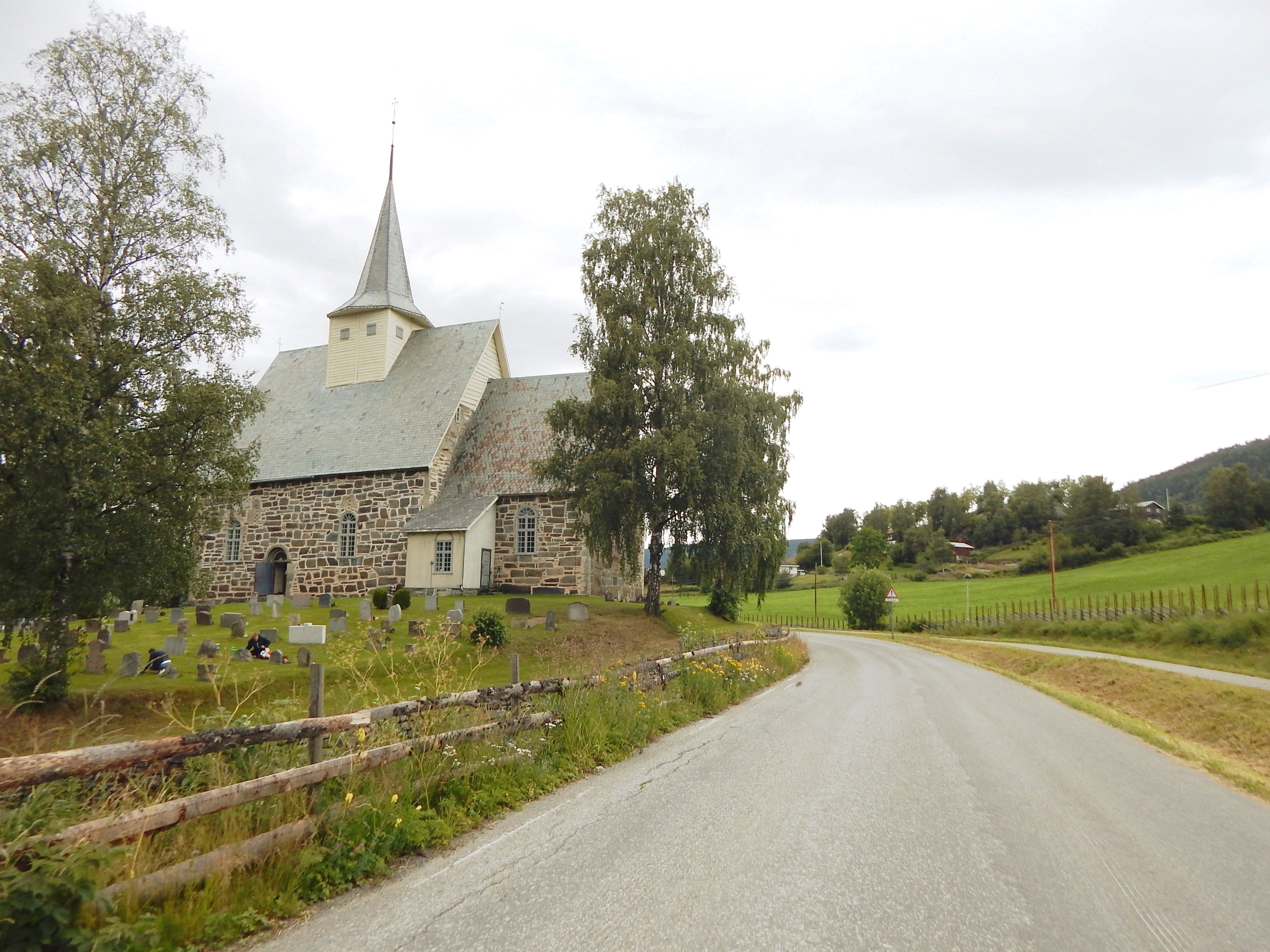
- View of the road past Slidredomen
- Interactive map of Slidre
- Location within Innlandet Location within Norway
- Coordinates: 61.08802°N 8.98141°E
- Country: Norway
- Region: Eastern Norway
- County: Innlandet
- District: Valdres
- Municipality: Vestre Slidre Municipality

Area
  - Total: 0.47 km^{2} (0.18 sq mi)
- Elevation: 397 m (1,302 ft)

Population (2024)
  - Total: 310
  - Density: 660/km^{2} (1,700/sq mi)
- Time zone: UTC+01:00 (CET)
  - Summer (DST): UTC+02:00 (CEST)
- Post Code: 2966 Slidre

Slidre is the administrative centre of Vestre Slidre Municipality in Innlandet county, Norway. The village is located along the Slidrefjorden in the Valdres district. The village is located along the European route E16 highway, about 25 kilometres (16 mi) northwest of Fagernes.

The 0.47-square-kilometre (120-acre) village has a population (2024) of 310 and a population density of 660 inhabitants per square kilometre (1,700/sq mi).

== History ==
Slidre is the site of the Slidredomen, a medieval era stone church. The village was the administrative centre of the old Slidre Municipality which existed from 1838 until 1849 when the municipality was divided.

=== Name ===
The municipality (and the parish) were named after the old Slidre farm (Old Norse: Slíðrar or Slíðrir) since this was the location of the first Slidre Church that was built during the 12th century. The meaning of the name is not definitively known. It could be derived from the word slir which means the narrow depression through which a river runs.
