= Vestre Slidre Municipality =

Municipality in Innlandet, Norway

Vestre Slidre Municipality Vestre Slidre kommune
- Municipality
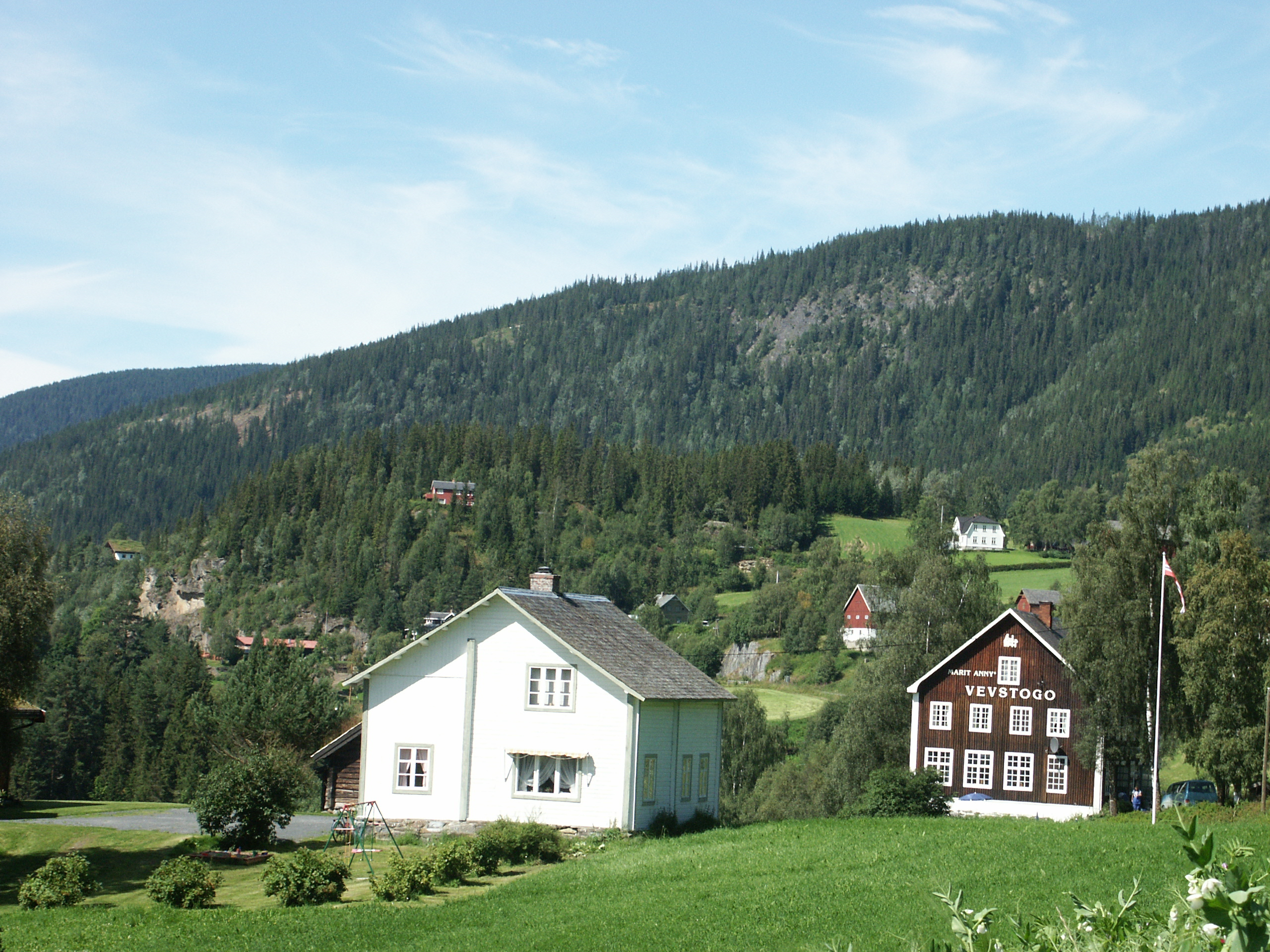
- View of Kvåle

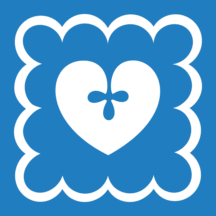
- Flag Coat of arms

- Innlandet within Norway

- Vestre Slidre within Innlandet
- Coordinates: 61°3′38″N 8°55′2″E
- Country: Norway
- County: Innlandet
- District: Valdres
- Established: 1 Jan 1849
  - Preceded by: Slidre Municipality
- Administrative centre: Slidre

Government
  - Mayor (2019): Haldor Ødegård (Sp)

Area
  - Total: 457.11 km^{2} (176.49 sq mi)
  - Land: 415.17 km^{2} (160.30 sq mi)
  - Water: 41.94 km^{2} (16.19 sq mi) 9.2%
  - Rank: #219 in Norway
- Highest elevation: 1,646.05 m (5,400.4 ft)

Population (2025)
  - Total: 2,142
  - Rank: #275 in Norway
  - Density: 4.7/km^{2} (12/sq mi)
  - Change (10 years): ▼ −3.4%
- Demonym: Vestreslidring

Official language
  - Norwegian form: Nynorsk
- Time zone: UTC+01:00 (CET)
  - Summer (DST): UTC+02:00 (CEST)
- ISO 3166 code: NO-3452
- Website: Official website

Vestre Slidre is a municipality in Innlandet county, Norway. It is located in the traditional district of Valdres. The administrative centre of the municipality is the village of Slidre. Other villages in the municipality include Lomen and Røn.

The 457-square-kilometre (176 sq mi) municipality is the 219th largest by area out of the 357 municipalities in Norway. Vestre Slidre Municipality is the 275th most populous municipality in Norway with a population of 2,142. The municipality's population density is 4.7 inhabitants per square kilometre (12/sq mi) and its population has decreased by 3.4% over the previous 10-year period.

== General information ==
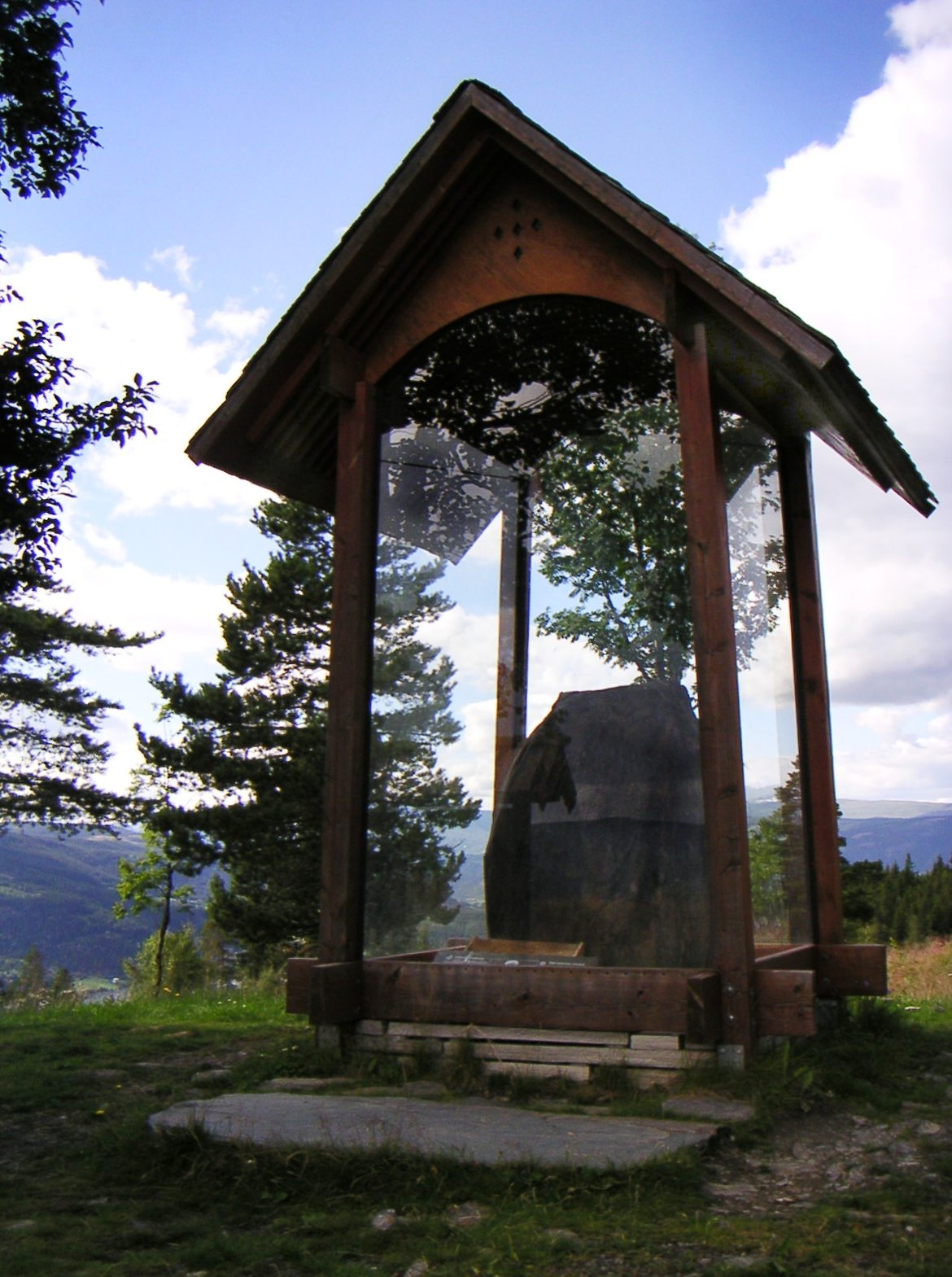
Einang stone, located at its original location atop the Gardberg site

The municipality of Vestre Slidre was established in 1849 when the old Slidre Municipality was divided into two municipalities: Vestre Slidre Municipality (population: 3,130) and Øystre Slidre Municipality (population: 2,406). On 1 January 1899, a small unpopulated part of Øystre Slidre Municipality was transferred to Vestre Slidre Municipality.

Historically, the municipality was part of the old Oppland county. On 1 January 2020, the municipality became a part of the newly-formed Innlandet county (after Hedmark and Oppland counties were merged).

On 1 January 2021, the Skjelgrenda area of Vestre Slidre Municipality was transferred to Øystre Slidre Municipality.

=== Name ===
The municipality (originally the parish) is named after the old Slidre farm (Old Norse: Slíðrar) since the old Slidredomen church was built there. The name is probably derived from the word slíðr which means "sheath" (which is probably referring to a long depression near the church). In 1849, the municipality (and parish) was divided into two separate municipalities. The word vestre (meaning "western") was added to the beginning of the name. Thus, the meaning of the name Vestre Slidre is "(the) western (part of) Slidre".

=== Coat of arms ===
The coat of arms was granted by royal decree on 20 November 1987. The official blazon is "Azure, a sea-leaf within a tressure invected on the outer edge and engrailed on the inner edge argent" (Norwegian: På blå grunn eit sølv sjøblad omgjeve av sølv bord laga med taggesnitt). This means the arms have a blue field (background) and the charge is a heart-shaped seeblatt design with a tressure border around the edge of the escutcheon. The charge has a tincture of argent which means it is commonly colored white, but if it is made out of metal, then silver is used. The design is based on a heraldic decoration found in the local Slidredomen church that dates back to the year 1170. The design was originally part of a seal that belonged to a medieval nobleman from the area. The arms were designed by Kari Ruud Flem. The municipal flag has the same design as the coat of arms.

=== Churches ===
The Church of Norway has three parishes (sokn) within Vestre Slidre Municipality. It is part of the Valdres prosti (deanery) in the Diocese of Hamar.

Churches in Vestre Slidre Municipality
Parish (sokn)	Church name	Location of the church	Year built
Lomen	Lomen Church	Lomen	1914
Lomen	Lomen Stave Church	Lomen	1179
Røn	Røn Church	Røn	1747
Røn	Øyjar Chapel	Øyjar	1963
Slidre	Slidredomen	Slidre	c. 1200

- The ruins of Mo church (Norwegian: Mo kirkeruin) are located on the west side of the Slidrefjorden. The medieval church of stone was built around the year 1215 and was probably out of use after the Reformation. The ruins were excavated and restored from 1972–1977.
- Slidredomen, a medieval stone-built church, was once the main church for all of Valdres. The church is built around the year 1170. The church is entirely made of stone. Its treasures formerly included a chalice presented by Bishop Salomon of Oslo (1322–1352), the only Bishop in Norway to survive the Black Death. Slidredomen is also known to have had a local bishop.
- Lomen Stave Church is located in the small village of Lomen. It was built around the year 1170. The exterior of the present Lomen Church is post-Reformation, and only the wall and roof timbers remain from the original building.
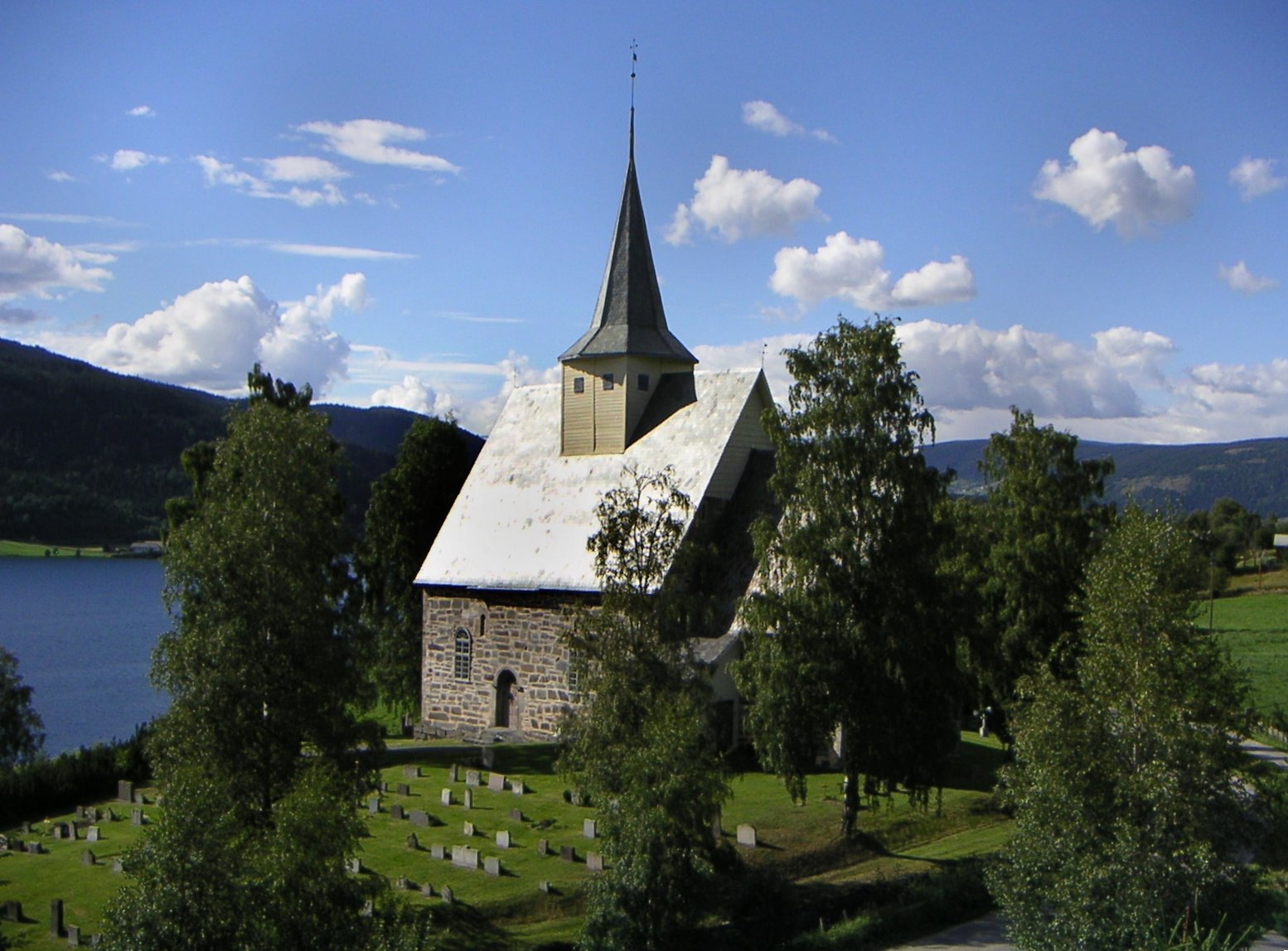
Slidredomen, medieval church

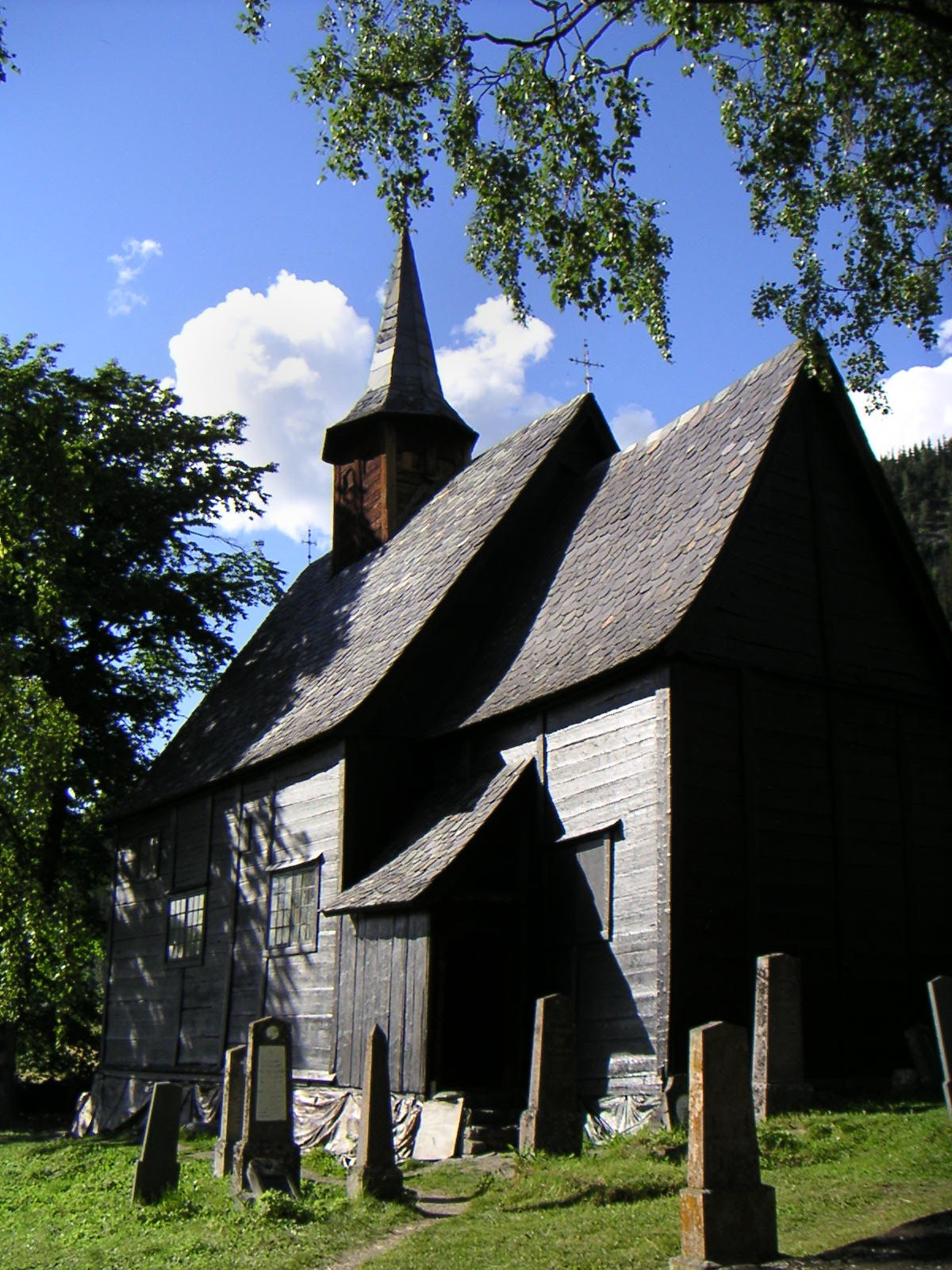
Lomen Stave Church in the summer of 2005

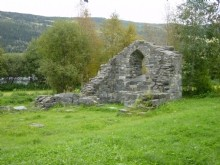
Ruins of Mo church

== History ==
Number of minorities (1st and 2nd generation) in Vestre Slidre by country of origin in 2017
Ancestry	Number
Lithuania	29
Netherlands	23
Eritrea	18

High above the village of Slidre, there is an ancient burial ground called the Gardberg site. At this site, there is a runestone which reads I Godguest wrote the runes. This stone is known as the Einang stone (Norwegian: Einangsteinen).

The area of today's Vestre Sildre Municipality are prominently discussed in the Old Norse Sagas:

- According to the Sagas, Harald Fairhair was the first Norwegian king (872–930) of Norway. In 866, he made the first of a series of conquests over a number of petty kingdoms. One of the encounters leading to the overall conquest was with Skallagrim Kveldulvssøn in Vestre Slidre. In 872, after winning the Battle of Hafrsfjord near Stavanger, he found himself king of the whole country.
- In the Heimskringla attributed to Snorri Sturluson, it is recorded that in 1023 King Olav came unannounced from Sogn as part of his campaign to Christianize Norway. At Slidre, he caught the peasants unaware and secured all their boats. As a condition for having their boats restored, they accepted Christianity.

== Government ==
Vestre Slidre Municipality is responsible for primary education (through 10th grade), outpatient health services, senior citizen services, welfare and other social services, zoning, economic development, and municipal roads and utilities. The municipality is governed by a municipal council of directly elected representatives. The mayor is indirectly elected by a vote of the municipal council. The municipality is under the jurisdiction of the Vestoppland og Valdres District Court and the Eidsivating Court of Appeal.

=== Municipal council ===
The municipal council (Kommunestyre) of Vestre Slidre Municipality is made up of 17 representatives that are elected to four year terms. The tables below show the current and historical composition of the council by political party.

Vestre Slidre kommunestyre 2023–2027
Party name (in Nynorsk)	Number of representatives
Labour Party (Arbeidarpartiet)	2
Green Party (Miljøpartiet Dei Grøne)	1
Centre Party (Senterpartiet)	10
Local List (Bygdeliste)	4
Total number of members:	17

Vestre Slidre kommunestyre 2019–2023
Party name (in Nynorsk)	Number of representatives
Labour Party (Arbeidarpartiet)	3
Green Party (Miljøpartiet Dei Grøne)	1
Centre Party (Senterpartiet)	9
Local List (Bygdeliste)	4
Total number of members:	17

Vestre Slidre kommunestyre 2015–2019
Party name (in Nynorsk)	Number of representatives
Labour Party (Arbeidarpartiet)	3
Green Party (Miljøpartiet Dei Grøne)	1
Centre Party (Senterpartiet)	6
Local List (Bygdeliste)	7
Total number of members:	17

Vestre Slidre kommunestyre 2011–2015
Party name (in Nynorsk)	Number of representatives
Labour Party (Arbeidarpartiet)	5
Centre Party (Senterpartiet)	6
Local List (Bygdeliste)	10
Total number of members:	21

Vestre Slidre kommunestyre 2007–2011
Party name (in Nynorsk)	Number of representatives
Labour Party (Arbeidarpartiet)	5
Centre Party (Senterpartiet)	6
Local List (Bygdeliste)	10
Total number of members:	21

Vestre Slidre kommunestyre 2003–2007
Party name (in Nynorsk)	Number of representatives
Labour Party (Arbeidarpartiet)	5
Centre Party (Senterpartiet)	6
Local List (Bygdeliste)	10
Total number of members:	21

Vestre Slidre kommunestyre 1999–2003
Party name (in Nynorsk)	Number of representatives
Labour Party (Arbeidarpartiet)	5
Centre Party (Senterpartiet)	6
Local List (Bygdeliste)	10
Total number of members:	21

Vestre Slidre kommunestyre 1995–1999
Party name (in Nynorsk)	Number of representatives
Labour Party (Arbeidarpartiet)	6
Progress Party (Framstegspartiet)	2
Centre Party (Senterpartiet)	8
Liberal Party (Venstre)	2
Joint list of the Conservative Party (Høgre) and Christian Democratic Party (Kristeleg Folkeparti)	3
Total number of members:	21

Vestre Slidre kommunestyre 1991–1995
Party name (in Nynorsk)	Number of representatives
Labour Party (Arbeidarpartiet)	6
Progress Party (Framstegspartiet)	1
Conservative Party (Høgre)	1
Christian Democratic Party (Kristeleg Folkeparti)	1
Centre Party (Senterpartiet)	8
Liberal Party (Venstre)	1
Cross-Party List (Tverrpolitisk liste)	3
Total number of members:	21

Vestre Slidre kommunestyre 1987–1991
Party name (in Nynorsk)	Number of representatives
Labour Party (Arbeidarpartiet)	8
Conservative Party (Høgre)	3
Christian Democratic Party (Kristeleg Folkeparti)	1
Centre Party (Senterpartiet)	7
Liberal Party (Venstre)	2
Total number of members:	21

Vestre Slidre kommunestyre 1983–1987
Party name (in Nynorsk)	Number of representatives
Labour Party (Arbeidarpartiet)	8
Conservative Party (Høgre)	2
Christian Democratic Party (Kristeleg Folkeparti)	1
Centre Party (Senterpartiet)	6
Liberal Party (Venstre)	2
Cross-party local list (Tverrpolitisk bygdeliste)	2
Total number of members:	21

Vestre Slidre kommunestyre 1979–1983
Party name (in Nynorsk)	Number of representatives
Labour Party (Arbeidarpartiet)	8
Conservative Party (Høgre)	4
Christian Democratic Party (Kristeleg Folkeparti)	2
Centre Party (Senterpartiet)	6
Liberal Party (Venstre)	1
Total number of members:	21

Vestre Slidre kommunestyre 1975–1979
Party name (in Nynorsk)	Number of representatives
Labour Party (Arbeidarpartiet)	8
Christian Democratic Party (Kristeleg Folkeparti)	3
Centre Party (Senterpartiet)	10
Total number of members:	21

Vestre Slidre kommunestyre 1971–1975
Party name (in Nynorsk)	Number of representatives
Labour Party (Arbeidarpartiet)	8
Centre Party (Senterpartiet)	10
Liberal Party (Venstre)	3
Total number of members:	21

Vestre Slidre kommunestyre 1967–1971
Party name (in Nynorsk)	Number of representatives
Labour Party (Arbeidarpartiet)	8
Centre Party (Senterpartiet)	8
Liberal Party (Venstre)	5
Total number of members:	21

Vestre Slidre kommunestyre 1963–1967
Party name (in Nynorsk)	Number of representatives
Labour Party (Arbeidarpartiet)	8
Centre Party (Senterpartiet)	9
Local List(s) (Lokale lister)	4
Total number of members:	21

Vestre Slidre heradsstyre 1959–1963
Party name (in Nynorsk)	Number of representatives
Labour Party (Arbeidarpartiet)	6
Centre Party (Senterpartiet)	7
Liberal Party (Venstre)	3
Local List(s) (Lokale lister)	5
Total number of members:	21

Vestre Slidre heradsstyre 1955–1959
Party name (in Nynorsk)	Number of representatives
Labour Party (Arbeidarpartiet)	6
Farmers' Party (Bondepartiet)	10
Liberal Party (Venstre)	5
Total number of members:	21

Vestre Slidre heradsstyre 1951–1955
Party name (in Nynorsk)	Number of representatives
Labour Party (Arbeidarpartiet)	6
Farmers' Party (Bondepartiet)	11
Liberal Party (Venstre)	7
Total number of members:	24

Vestre Slidre heradsstyre 1947–1951
Party name (in Nynorsk)	Number of representatives
Labour Party (Arbeidarpartiet)	5
Farmers' Party (Bondepartiet)	11
Joint list of the Liberal Party (Venstre) and the Radical People's Party (Radikale Folkepartiet)	8
Total number of members:	24

Vestre Slidre heradsstyre 1945–1947
Party name (in Nynorsk)	Number of representatives
Labour Party (Arbeidarpartiet)	7
Farmers' Party (Bondepartiet)	5
Joint list of the Liberal Party (Venstre) and the Radical People's Party (Radikale Folkepartiet)	9
Local List(s) (Lokale lister)	3
Total number of members:	24

Vestre Slidre heradsstyre 1937–1941*
Party name (in Nynorsk)	Number of representatives
Labour Party (Arbeidarpartiet)	4
Farmers' Party (Bondepartiet)	11
Joint list of the Liberal Party (Venstre) and the Radical People's Party (Radikale Folkepartiet)	9
Total number of members:	24
Note: Due to the German occupation of Norway during World War II, no elections were held for new municipal councils until after the war ended in 1945.

=== Mayors ===
The mayor (Nynorsk: ordførar) of Vestre Slidre Municipality is the political leader of the municipality and the chairperson of the municipal council. Here is a list of people who have held this position:

- 1849–1849: Ole O. Kvale
- 1850–1850: Georg Prahl Harbitz
- 1851–1855: Ole Brandt
- 1856–1859: Haaken Pedersen Semmelinge
- 1860–1879: Ole Brandt
- 1880–1881: Ole Fosheim
- 1882–1883: Ole O. Kvale
- 1884–1893: Ole Knutson Ødegaard (V)
- 1894–1896: Eivind Fosheim
- 1896–1904: Gullik E. Lome
- 1905–1911: Arne Grøndahl
- 1911–1913: Embrik Magistad (Ap)
- 1914–1934: Samson Bakken (FV)
- 1934–1937: Jon Wangensten Holden (Bp)
- 1937–1941: Endre Fyrstro (V)
- 1941–1945: Olav Færden (NS)
- 1945–1947: Endre Fyrstro (V)
- 1948–1951: Ola J. Dahle (Sp)
- 1952–1955: Erik Steine Riste (Sp)
- 1956–1963: Erik Kirkeeng (V)
- 1964–1967: Erik Steine Riste (Sp)
- 1968–1979: Ola Ødegård (Sp)
- 1980–1999: Sverre Vik (Sp)
- 1999–2011: Eivind Brenna (BL)
- 2011–2015: Lars Kvissel (Sp)
- 2015–2019: Eivind Brenna (V)
- 2019–present: Haldor Ødegård (Sp)

== Geography ==
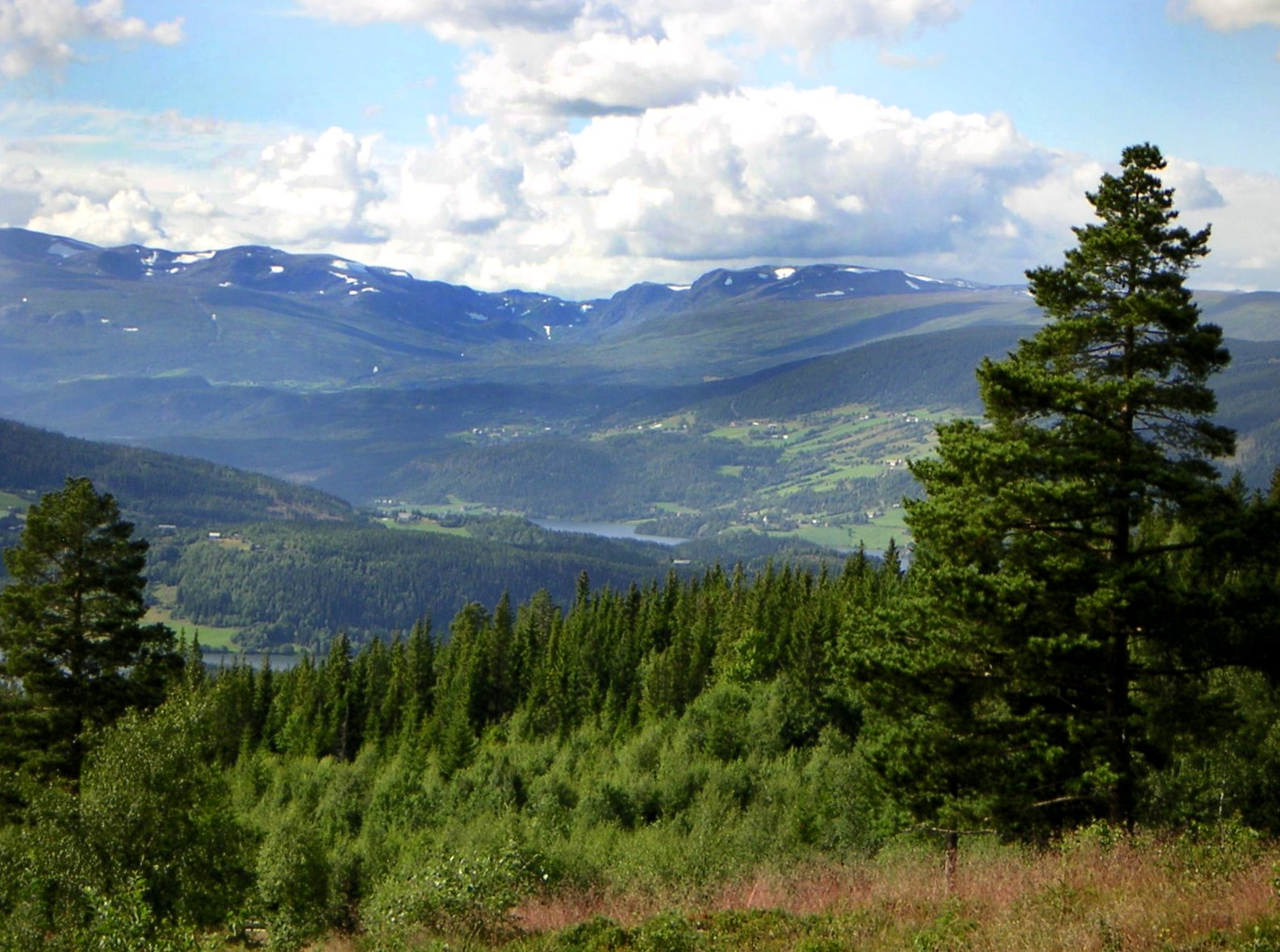
View over Lomen from the Gardberg site, with Vang Municipality slightly to the left and Jotunheimen in the background. Down by the lake and to the right is Lomen.

Vestre Slidre Municipality is bordered to the northwest by Vang Municipality, to the northeast by Øystre Slidre Municipality, to the east by Nord-Aurdal Municipality, and to the southwest by Hemsedal Municipality (in Buskerud county). Vestre Slidre Municipality is part of the Valdres region in south-central Norway. It is situated between the Gudbrandsdal and Hallingdal valleys.

The municipality is located along the river Begna and its surrounding valley. There are several lakes in the municipalities including Helin, Øyangen, Slidrefjorden, and Strondafjorden. The highest point in the municipality is the 1,646.05-metre (5,400.4 ft) tall point on the mountain Blåkampen (it is not at the peak of Blåkampen, but the a lower secondary peak on the south side of the mountain).

== Notable people ==
- Ole Brandt (1818–1880), a farmer and mayor of Vestre Slidre Municipality during the 1850s and 1860s
- Ragnhild Kåta (1873–1947), the first deafblind Norwegian to receive proper schooling
- Ola Bøe (1910–1986), a Norwegian fiddler
- Knut Hauge (1911–1999), an author of novels, children's books, and plays
- Berit Skjefte (1809–1899), a langeleik player
