= Slidrefjorden =

Lake in Innlandet, Norway

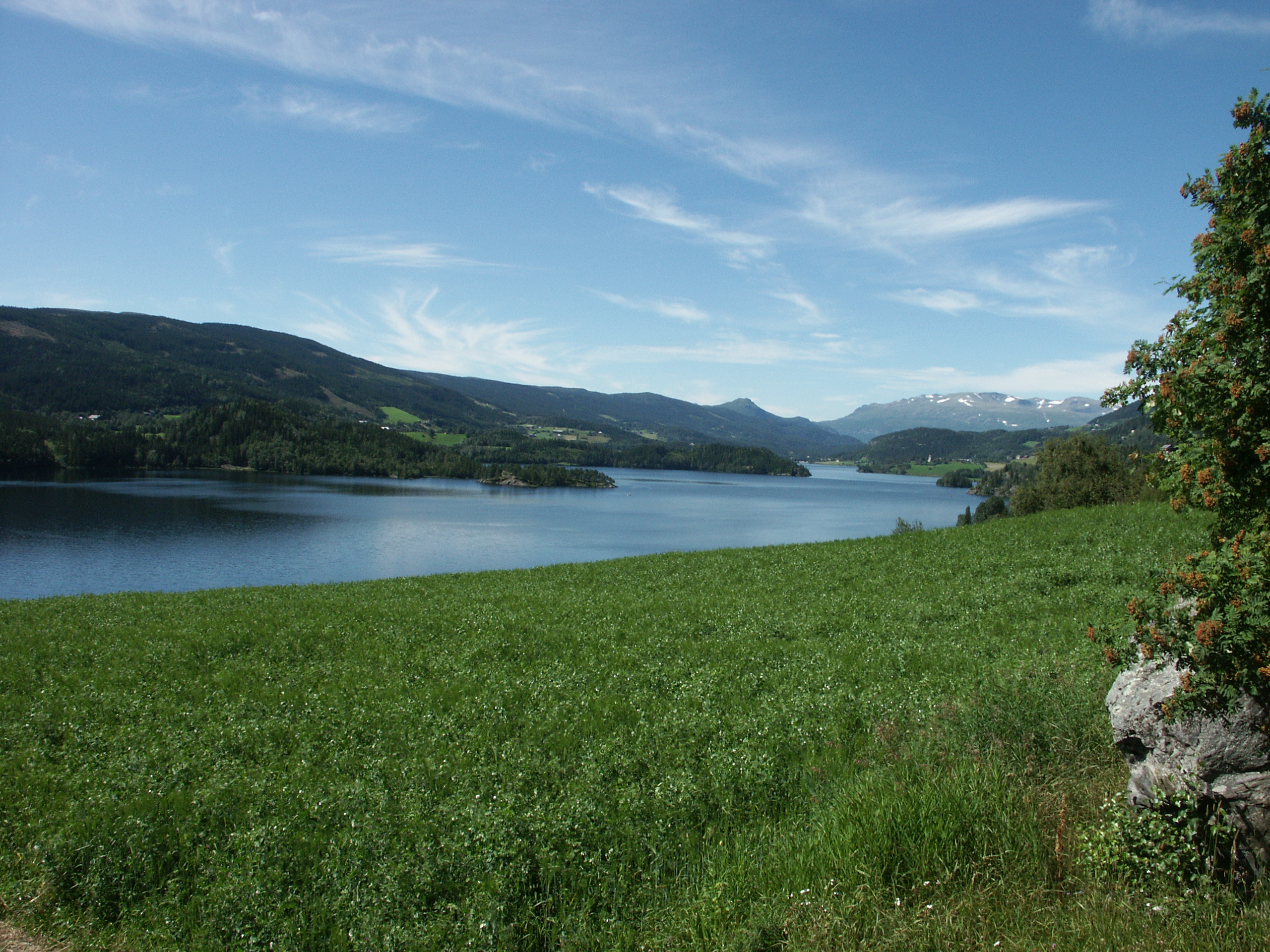
- View of the lake
- Interactive map of the lake
- Location: Innlandet, Norway
- Coordinates: 61°05′35″N 08°57′48″E
- Basin countries: Norway
- Max. length: 16.3 kilometres (10.1 mi)
- Max. width: 1.4 kilometres (0.87 mi)
- Surface area: 11.4 km^{2} (4.4 sq mi)
- Max. depth: 76 metres (249 ft)
- Shore length^{1}: 46.34 kilometres (28.79 mi)
- Surface elevation: 366 metres (1,201 ft)
- References: NVE
- ^{1} Shore length is not a well-defined measure.

Slidrefjorden (English: Slidre Fjord) is a lake that lies in Vestre Slidre Municipality (and the far northwestern end of the lake lies in Vang Municipality) in Innlandet county, Norway. The lake is not a fjord in the conventional sense in English as it is not connected to the sea, and is part of the Begna River watershed.

Slidrefjorden has a surface area of 11.4 square kilometres (4.4 sq mi) and a shore length of 46.34 kilometres (28.79 mi). The lake sits at 366 metres (1,201 ft) above sea level. The European route E16 highway runs along the northern shore of the lake.

== See also ==
- List of lakes in Norway
