= Jotunheimen og Valdresruten Bilselskap =

Transport company with headquarters in Fagernes, Norway

A/S Jotunheimen og Valdresruten Bilselskap (JVB) is a transport company with headquarters in Fagernes in Nord-Aurdal Municipality in Innlandet county, Norway. In 2009, the company had a turnover of 96,981,000 kr and is currently the largest road transport company in Oppland based in the county. JVB has 120 employees and has daily routes in Valdres, Land and from Fagernes to Gol, Lærdalsøyri, Gjendesheim, Gjøvik, and Oslo. The company mainly deals with personal transport by bus.

== History ==
JVB was founded on 21 November 1919 after Automobil A/S "Jotunheim" and A/S Valdresrutens Automobilselskap joined together on the same day as dissolving themselves. JVB's bus operations can therefore be traced back to 1909. By summer 1910, the two companies had a total of 11 buses in operation from Fagernes. No other place in Norway had this number of vehicles in operation.

- In 1944, MB Bitihorn was taken over by JVB.
- In 1947, JVB took over the route to Ola Paulsrud in Øystre Slidre Municipality.
- In 1952, JVB began tour buses for Winge Reisebureau and "Norwegian Fjord Lines" tours between Oslo and Bergen.
- In 1953, (15 August) JVB and Ola Westheim bought the bus "Vesle-Venus" as the first bus to travel through Valdresflye.
- In 1954, JVB took over L/L Valdres Lastebilselskap, and JVB took over all personal passengers.
- In 1956, JVB took over Anton Sørumshaugen's route between Fagernes and Aurdal.

=== Company services ===
- Local bus routes
- School routes
- MB Bitihorn to Bygdin
- Beltebilruta from Tyin to Eidsbugarden
- Express busses which cross counties to and from large towns such as Bergen, Oslo, Lillehammer, Hønefoss
  - Valdresekspressen (Oslo-Fagernes-Beitostølen / Tyin - Årdal)
  - Øst-Vest Xpressen (Lillehammer-Fagernes-Sogn-Bergen)

=== Daughter companies ===
- JVB Tur AS
- NorXpress AS
- JVB Travel AS
