= Leira, Innlandet =

Village in Nord-Aurdal Municipality, Norway

Leira Leira i Valdres
- Village
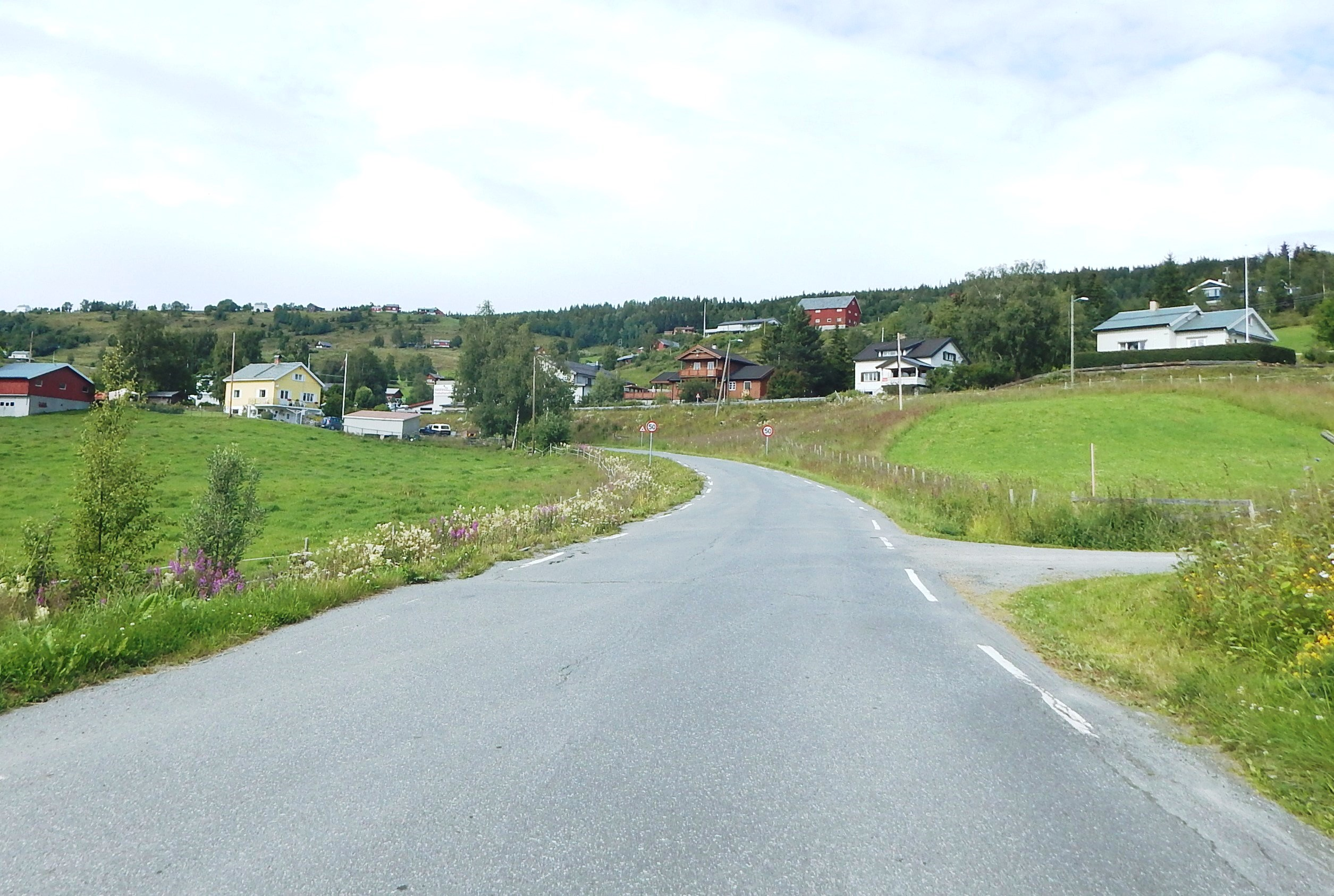
- View of the village area
- Interactive map of Leira
- Location within Innlandet Location within Norway
- Coordinates: 60.97006°N 9.29488°E
- Country: Norway
- Region: Eastern Norway
- County: Innlandet
- District: Valdres
- Municipality: Nord-Aurdal Municipality

Area
  - Total: 1.14 km^{2} (0.44 sq mi)
- Elevation: 372 m (1,220 ft)

Population (2024)
  - Total: 944
  - Density: 828/km^{2} (2,140/sq mi)
- Time zone: UTC+01:00 (CET)
  - Summer (DST): UTC+02:00 (CEST)
- Post Code: 2920 Leira i Valdres

Leira is a village in Nord-Aurdal Municipality in Innlandet county, Norway. The village is located along the river Begna, about 2 kilometres (1.2 mi) to the southeast of the town of Fagernes.

The European route E16 highway runs through the village. The village of Aurdal lies about 10 kilometres (6.2 mi) to the southeast and the village of Skrautvål lies about 8 kilometres (5.0 mi) to the northeast (on the other side of the town of Fagernes).

The 1.14-square-kilometre (280-acre) village has a population (2024) of 944 and a population density of 828 inhabitants per square kilometre (2,140/sq mi).

== Name ==
The place is named after the river Leira. The name of the river is derived from leire which means "clay". Leira is a common name of rivers many places in Norway.
