= Tisleifjorden =

Lake in Innlandet and V Buskerud, Norway

- Tisleifjord / Tesleien (historic)
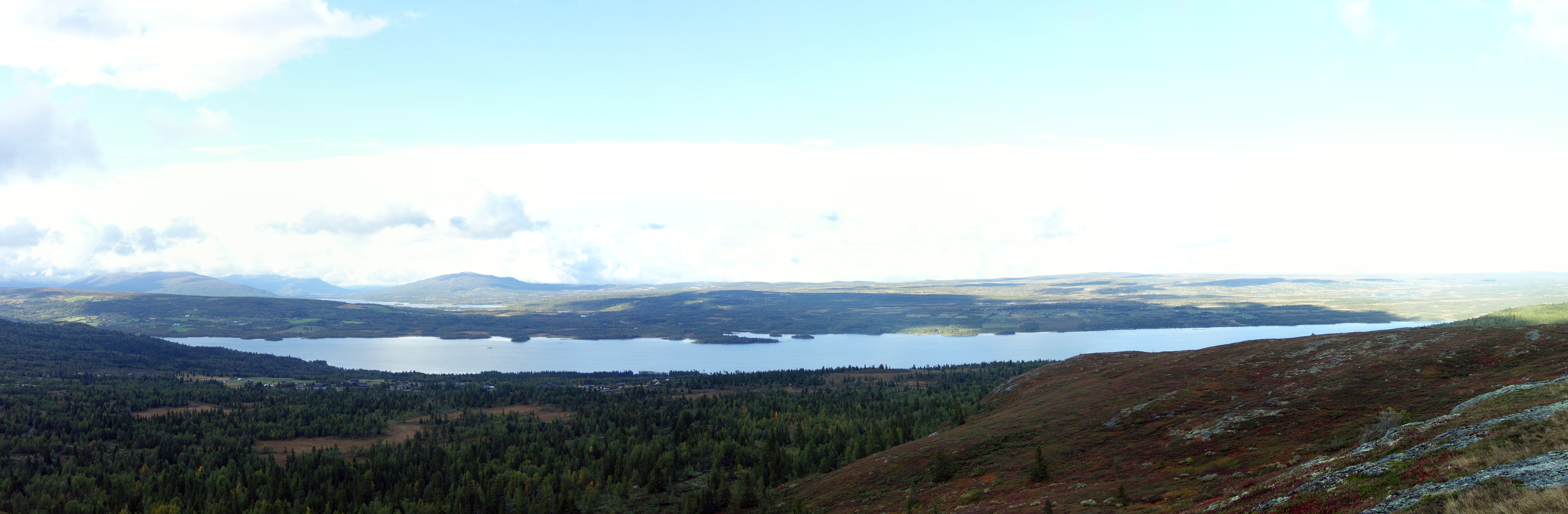
- Tisleifjorden from Auenhaugen
- Interactive map of the lake
- Location: Innlandet and Buskerud, Norway
- Coordinates: 60.86821°N 8.92377°E
- Type: Reservoir
- Basin countries: Norway
- Max. length: 11 kilometres (6.8 mi)
- Max. width: 2 kilometres (1.2 mi)
- Surface area: 13.44 km^{2} (5.19 sq mi)
- Max. depth: 37 metres (121 ft)
- Shore length^{1}: 32.5 kilometres (20.2 mi)
- Surface elevation: 819 metres (2,687 ft)
- References: NVE
- ^{1} Shore length is not a well-defined measure.

Tisleifjorden is a lake on the border of Innlandet and Buskerud counties in Norway. The lake lies in Nord-Aurdal Municipality in Innlandet county, as well in Gol Municipality and Hemsedal Municipality in Buskerud county. Tisleifjorden is dammed for hydroelectric power. The elevation of the lake lies around 819 metres (2,687 ft) above sea level, but it can vary up to 11 metres (36 ft). The 13.54-square-kilometre (5.23 sq mi) lake has a circumference of about 32.5 kilometres (20.2 mi). It is located about 25 kilometres (16 mi) to the southwest of the town of Fagernes.

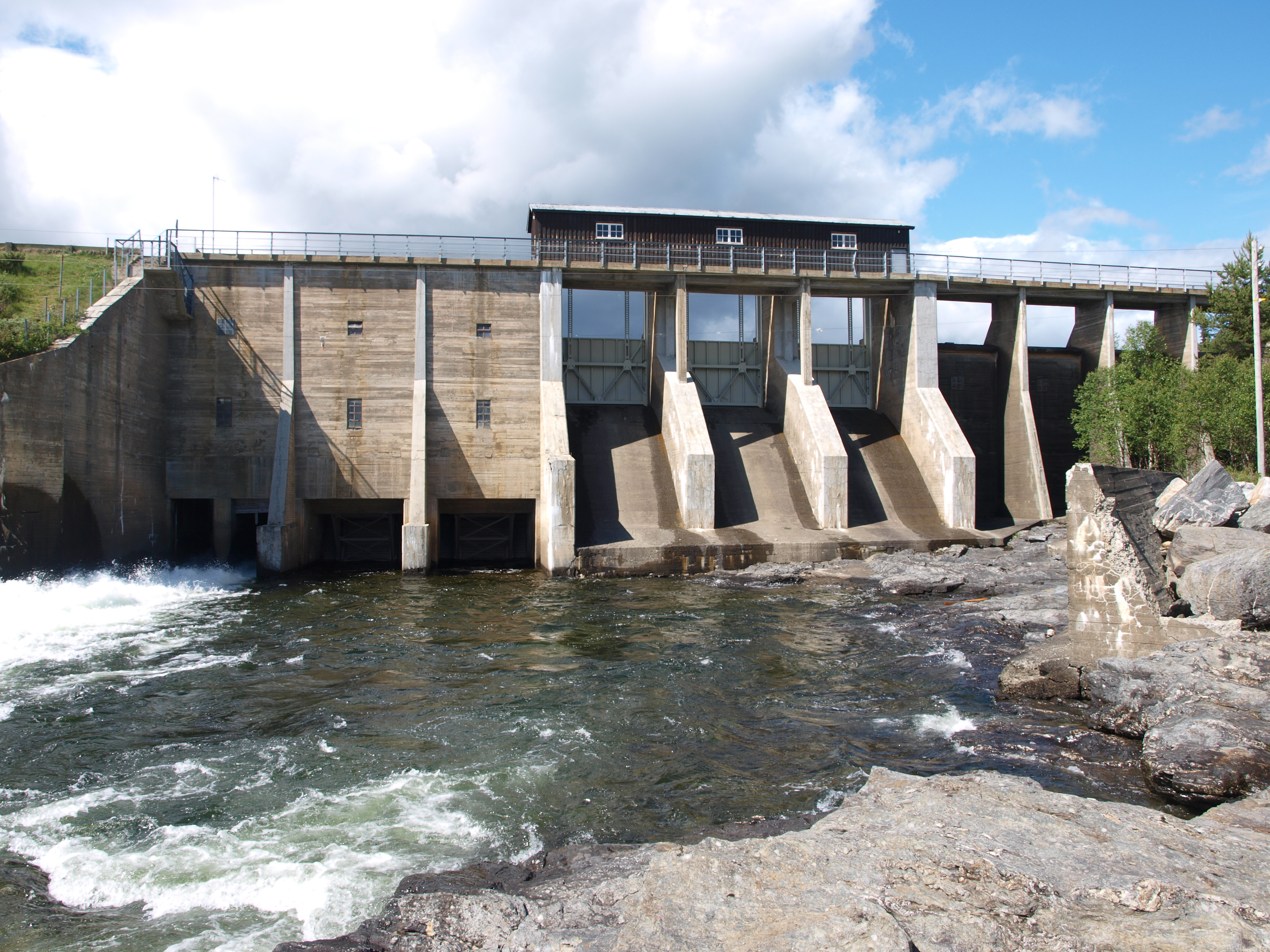
Tisleifjorden dam

== Dam ==
The Tisleifjorden Dam creates a reservoir for the Åbjøra kraftverk hydro-electric power plant along the Aurdalsfjorden near the village of Aurdal. The power plant was built from 1949 to 1951 and it was rebuilt in 2002. Åbjøra kraftverk is operated by Skagerak Energi.

== See also ==
- List of lakes in Norway
