= Tingnes Church =

Church in Innlandet, Norway

- Tingnes kirke
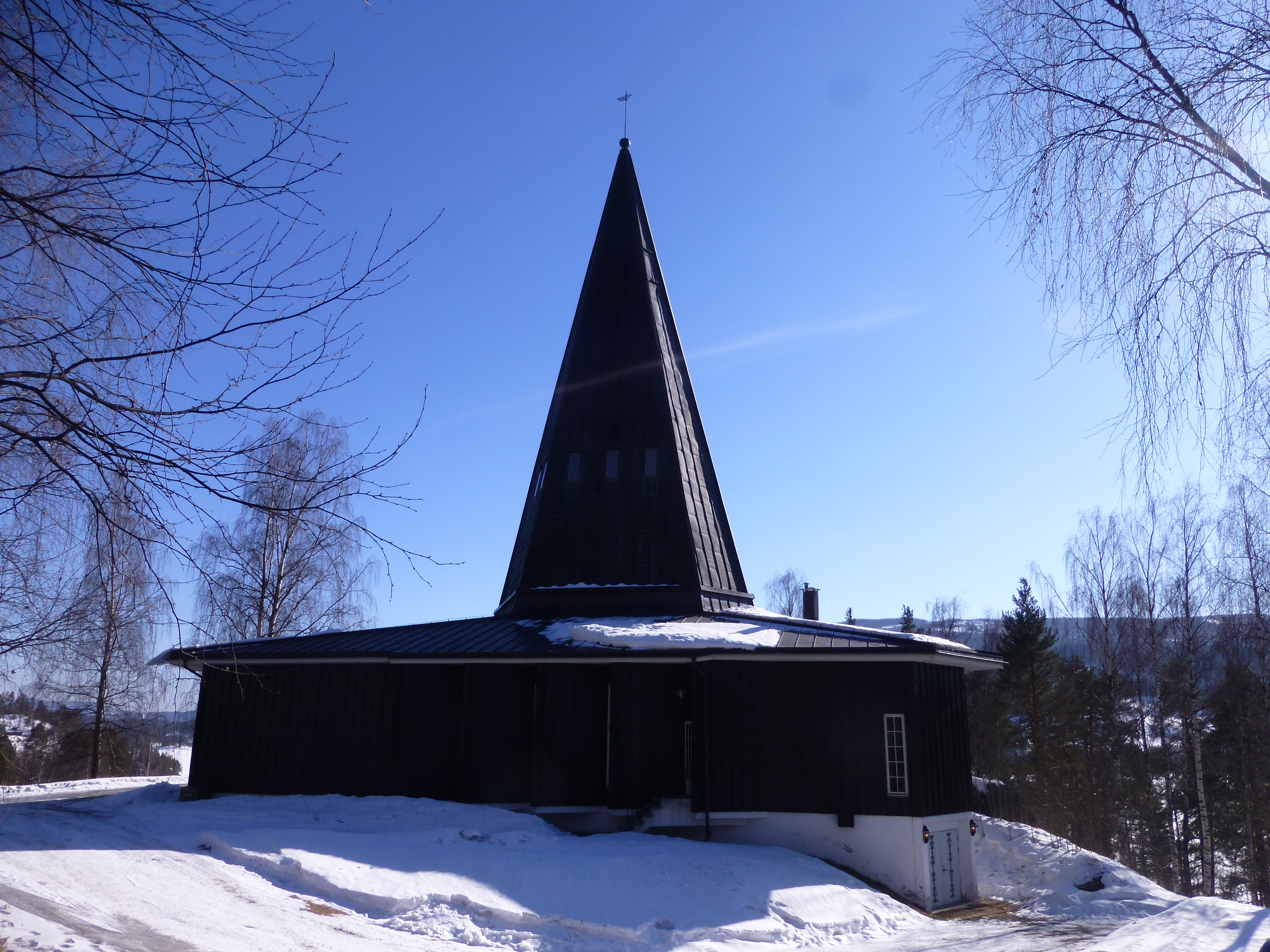
- View of the church
- Tingnes Church
- 60°59′02″N 9°15′30″E
- Location: Nord-Aurdal, Innlandet
- Country: Norway
- Denomination: Church of Norway
- Churchmanship: Evangelical Lutheran

History
- Former name(s): Fagernes Chapel; Skogajordet Church
- Status: Parish church
- Founded: 1972
- Consecrated: 10 September 1972

Architecture
- Functional status: Active
- Architect: Karl Stenersen
- Architectural type: Hexagonal
- Completed: 1972 (54 years ago)

Specifications
- Capacity: 260
- Materials: Wood

Administration
- Diocese: Hamar bispedømme
- Deanery: Valdres prosti
- Parish: Tingnes

Tingnes Church (Norwegian: Tingnes kirke) is a parish church of the Church of Norway in Nord-Aurdal Municipality in Innlandet county, Norway. It is located in the village of Fagernes. It is the church for the Tingnes parish which is part of the Valdres prosti (deanery) in the Diocese of Hamar. The brown, wooden church was built in a hexagonal design in 1972 using plans drawn up by the architect Karl Stenersen. The church seats about 260 people.

== History ==
After World War II, planning began for a new chapel and cemetery in Fagernes. A new cemetery at Skogajordet was established in 1967. The cemetery is relatively hilly and surrounded by a picket fence. The architect Karl Stenersen was commissioned to design the new chapel in 1969 and made two drafts: a traditional church building and a more modern hexagonal building. The parish chose the modern one. The basic shape of the chapel is like an equilateral triangle where the tips are cut off, making it a hexagon shape. The roof construction looks like a large church spire. The foundation stone was laid in 1971, and the chapel (as it was then titled) was built by builder Bjarne Sanne and consecrated on 10 September 1972. The chapel was built with the main nave on the main level and the lower floor was furnished for various other functions. Initially, the building was called Fagernes Chapel and it was an annex chapel under the main Skrautvål Church. There was local opposition to the name, however. Locally, the people referred to it as the "Kyrkja på Skogajordet" (Church at Skogajordet) for a number of years. The municipality proposed "Fagernes and Leira chapel", but that was not accepted by the Diocese. In 1978, the name officially became Tingnes Chapel. In 1998, the chapel was upgraded to a parish church status so it was renamed "Tingnes Church".

== See also ==
- List of churches in Hamar
