= Makalausfjellet =

Mountain in Innlandet, Norway

- Makalaus
- Interactive map of the mountain

Highest point
- Elevation: 1,099 m (3,606 ft)
- Prominence: 250 m (820 ft)
- Parent peak: Nystølvarden
- Isolation: 4.9 km (3.0 mi)
- Coordinates: 60°50′20″N 9°21′49″E

Geography
- Location: Innlandet, Norway

Makalausfjellet is a mountain on the border of Nord-Aurdal Municipality and Sør-Aurdal Municipality in Innlandet county, Norway. The 1,099-metre (3,606 ft) tall mountain lies about 18 kilometres (11 mi) southeast of the town of Fagernes.

== See also ==
- List of mountains of Norway
