= Kaare Strøm =

Kaare Strøm may refer to:

- Kaare Strøm (limnologist) (1902–1967), Norwegian limnologist
- Kaare Strøm (athlete) (1915–1982), Norwegian triple and long jumper
- Kaare Strøm (political scientist) (born 1953), Norwegian political scientist
