= Granheim =

Granheim is a Norwegian surname. Notable people with the surname include:

- Asbjørn Granheim (1906–1977), Norwegian politician
- Else Granheim (1926–1999), Norwegian librarian and civil servant
- Tormod Granheim (born 1974), Norwegian adventurer and motivational speaker
