= JVB =

JVB may refer to:

- Jain Vishva Bharati University, Ladnun, Rajasthan, India
- Jong Vlaanderen-Bauknecht or Ventilair-Steria Cycling Team, a former Continental cycling team 2005–2013 based in Belgium
- Jotunheimen og Valdresruten Bilselskap, a transport company with headquarters in Fagernes, Nord-Aurdal, Oppland, Norway
- Joey Valence & Brae, a hip-hop duo
