= Ulnes Church =

Church in Innlandet, Norway

- Ulnes kyrkje
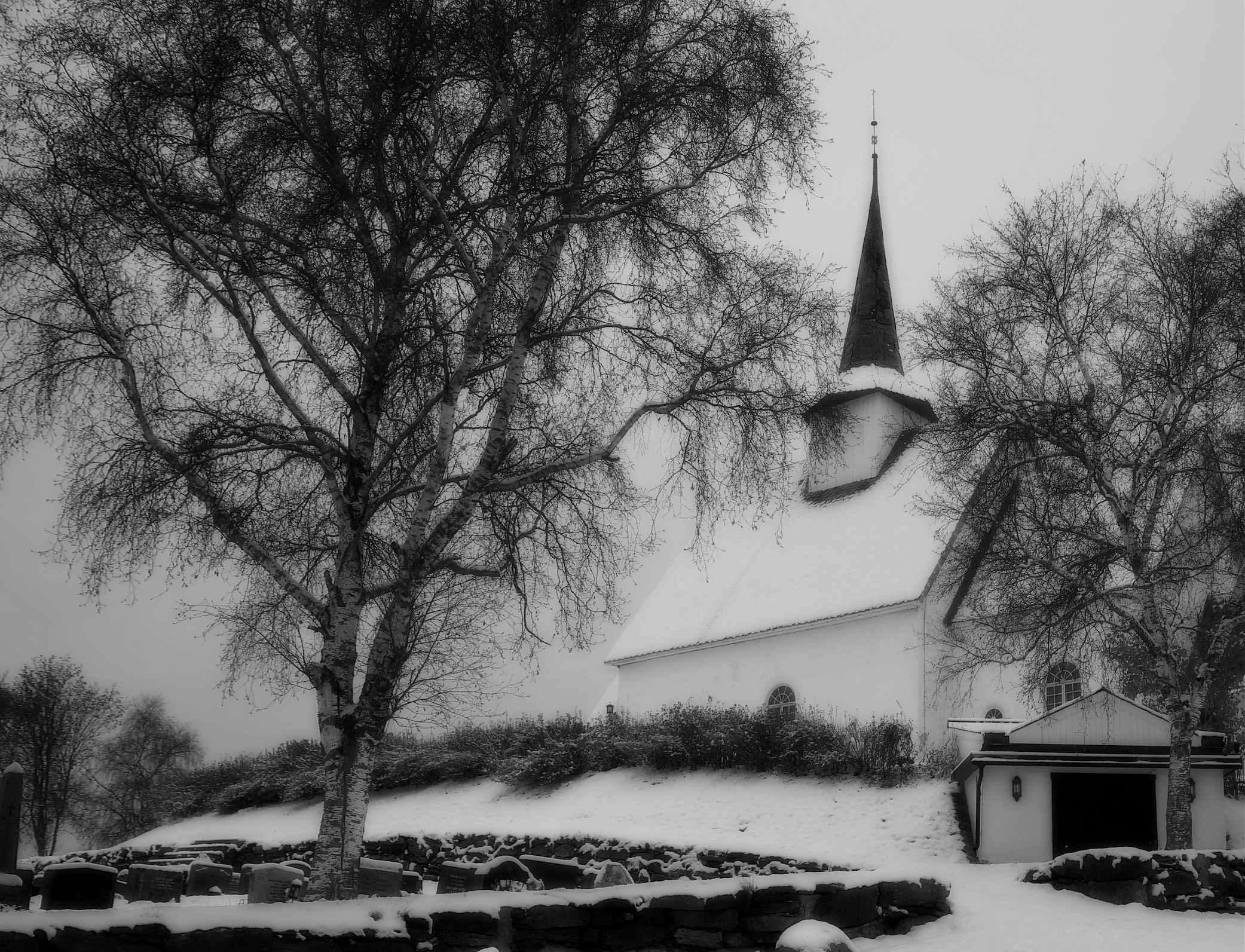
- View of the church
- Ulnes Church
- 60°59′42″N 9°06′49″E
- Location: Nord-Aurdal, Innlandet
- Country: Norway
- Denomination: Church of Norway
- Previous denomination: Catholic Church
- Churchmanship: Evangelical Lutheran

History
- Status: Parish church
- Founded: c. 1265
- Consecrated: c. 1265

Architecture
- Functional status: Active
- Architectural type: Long church
- Completed: c. 1265 (761 years ago)

Specifications
- Capacity: 170
- Materials: Stone

Administration
- Diocese: Hamar bispedømme
- Deanery: Valdres prosti
- Parish: Ulnes
- Norwegian Cultural Heritage Site
- Type: Church
- Status: Automatically protected
- ID: 85720

Ulnes Church (Norwegian: Ulnes kyrkje) is a parish church of the Church of Norway in Nord-Aurdal Municipality in Innlandet county, Norway. It is located in the village of Ulnes. It is the church for the Ulnes parish which is part of the Valdres prosti (deanery) in the Diocese of Hamar. The white, stone church was built in a long church design around the year 1265 using plans drawn up by an unknown architect. The church seats about 170 people.

== History ==
The earliest existing historical records of the church date back to the year 1307, but the church was not built that year. The long church is built of stone with masonry reflecting a transition between the Romanesque and Gothic style, both of which can be found in the church. Based on its historical style and masonry, it was probably built around the year 1265. The Norwegian Institute for Cultural Heritage Research used dendrochronology to date part of the roof construction which showed that the church was likely built in 1265 or 1266. The roofing of another medieval church in the area, Slidre Cathedral, was also dated to 1268 using the same method. Jahn Børe Jahnsen, a conservator at Valdres Folkemuseum, has observed that it was remarkable that they are dated so close to each other.

The church fell into disrepair, and in 1675 there were plans to replace it with a new wooden church, but this never happened. Shortly before 1720, the church was taken out of regular use because of its condition and parishioners had to go to other churches. In a famous description from a trip in 1733-1734, Bishop Peder Hersleb described the church "as a pile of stones", with only the choir being suitable to keep. He said the nave measured about 12 by 8.8 metres (39 ft × 29 ft) and the choir measured about 6.9 by 7.6 metres (23 ft × 25 ft). In 1734 the rector wanted to close and demolish it in favor of the nearby Svenes Church, but the local people protested. Ulnes Church was rebuilt and restored shortly afterwards in 1737. The nave was demolished and completely rebuilt, somewhat larger than before. The interior of the church was also refurbished during this project and it was decorated with paintings by Ola Hermundsson Berge (1768–1825) in the late 1700s. Additional paintings were created between 1850 and 1853 by Halvard Rye. The church was rebuilt in 1891–1894 and which included the addition of a new church porch at the west end and a sacristy on the east en. In 1953-1954, the church was renovated again by the architect Hans Magnus and the lead builder was Lars M. Wiknes. The church received a new wooden church porch and sacristy. The interior was also restored at this time. In 1977, bathroom facilities were installed in the church porch.

== Media gallery ==
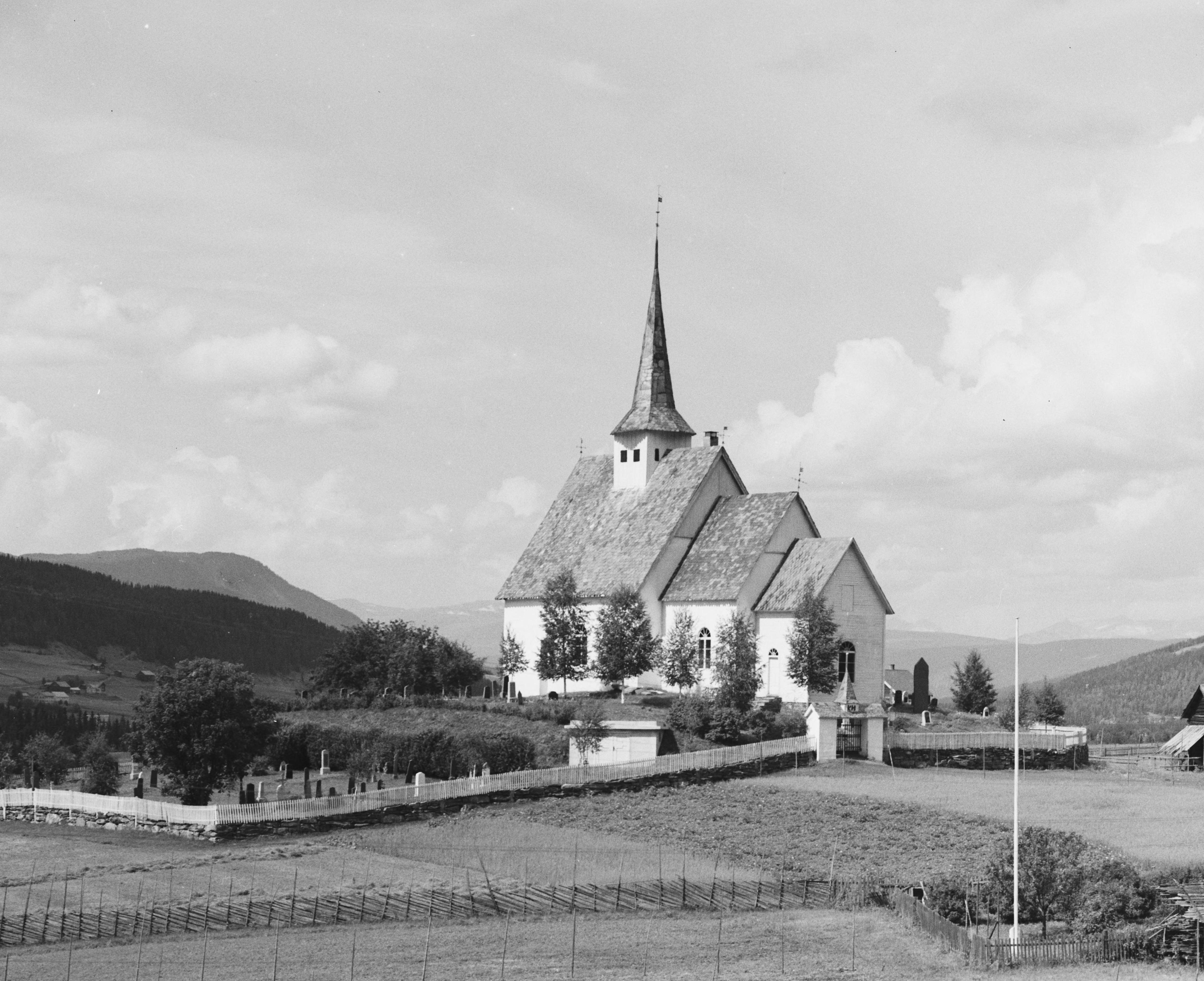

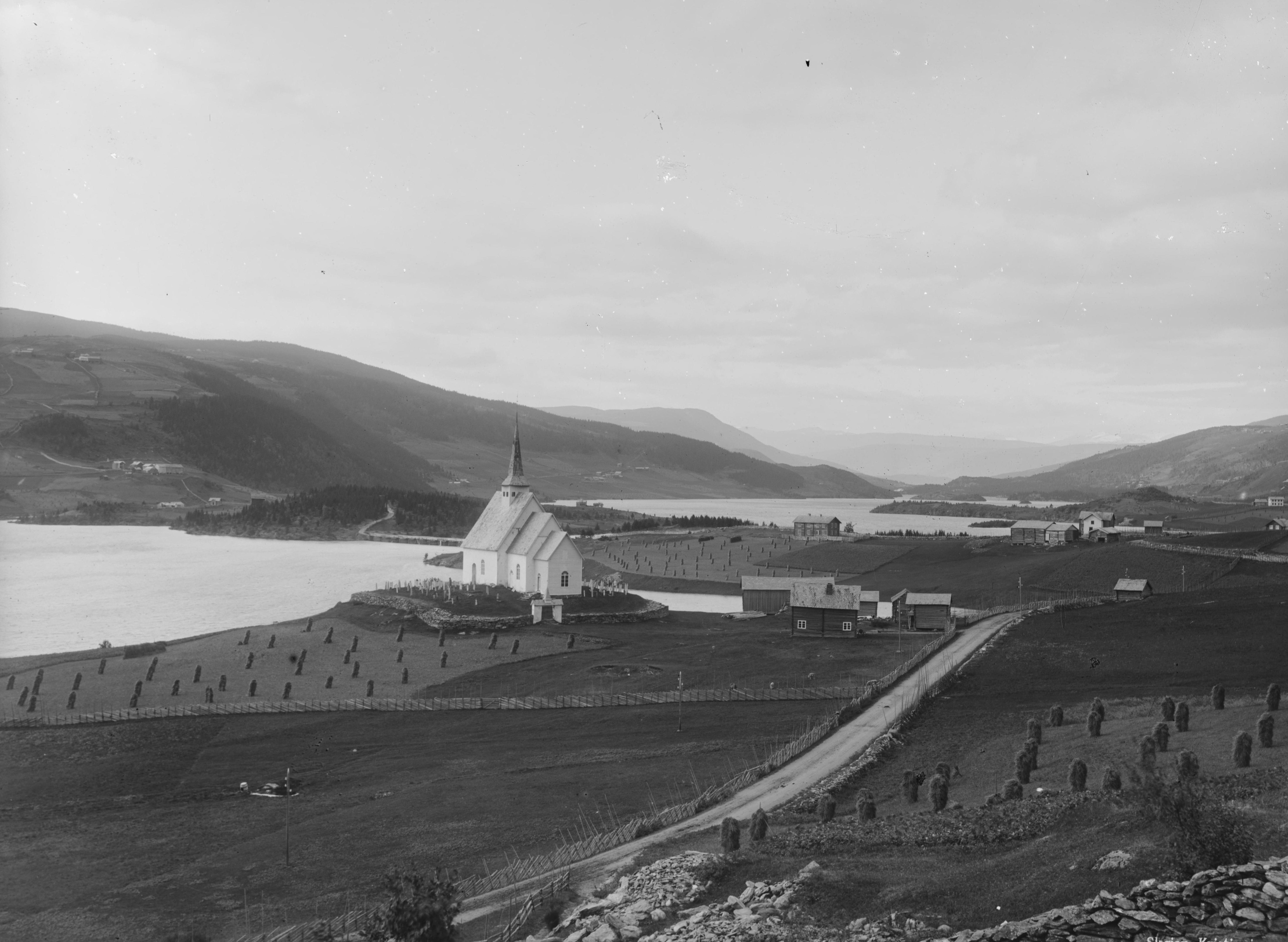

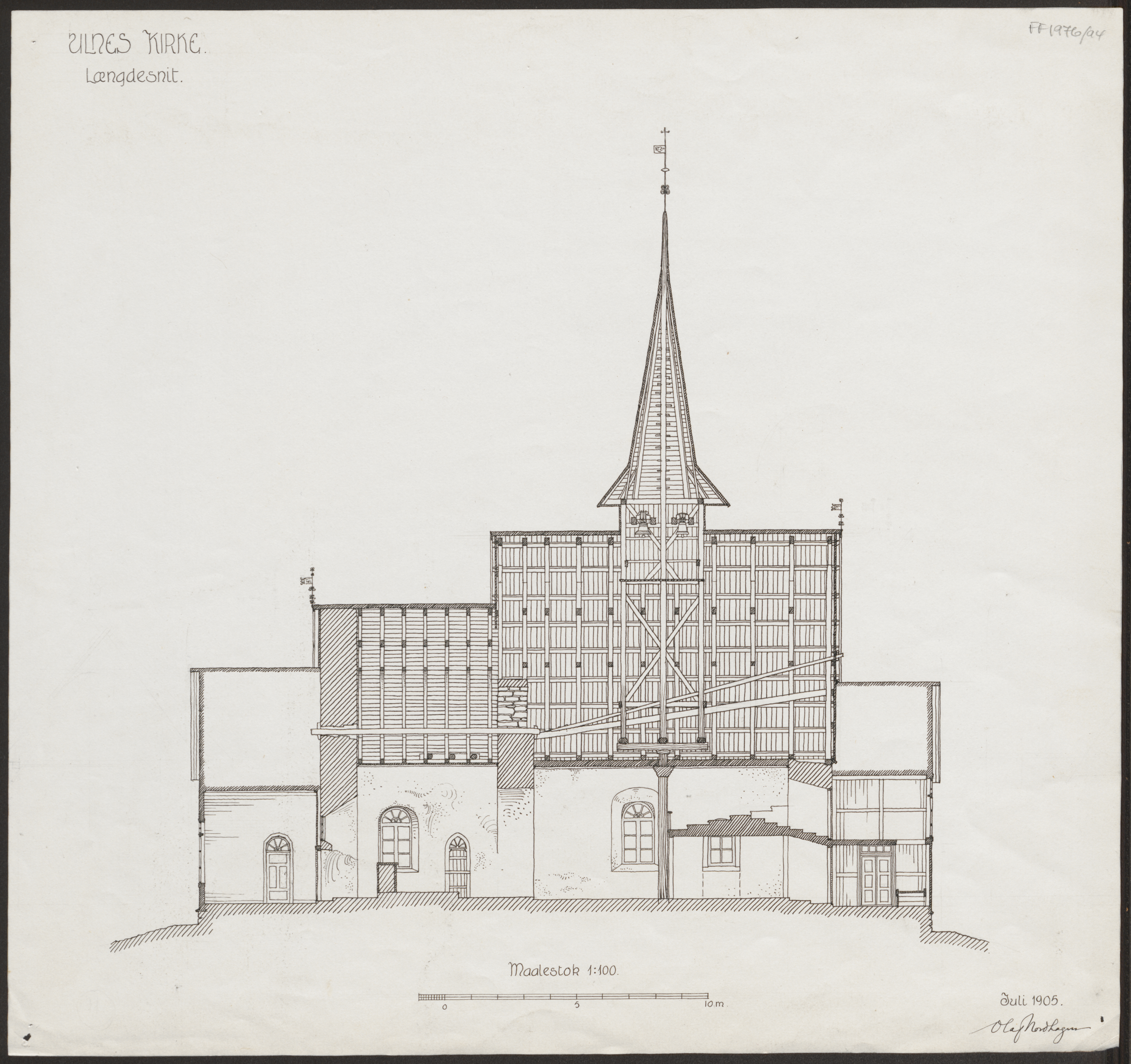

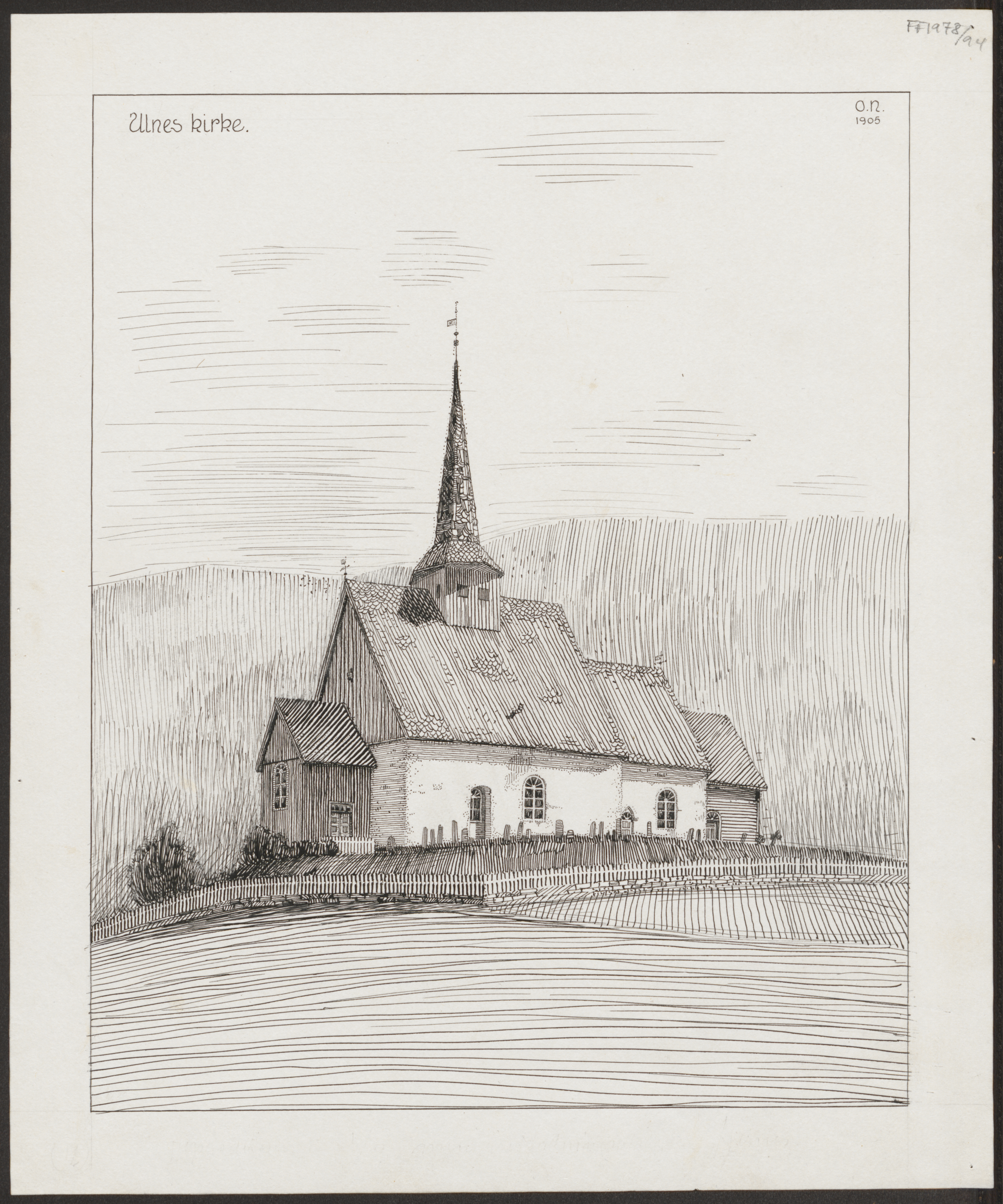

== See also ==
- List of churches in Hamar

== Other sources ==
- Jahnsen, Jahn Børe (1995). Ulnes kyrkje : 750 år 1995 – bygd midt på 1200-talet. Ulnes Sokneråd. ISBN 8299355400.
