= Tisleidalen Church =

Church in Innlandet, Norway

- Tisleidalen kirke
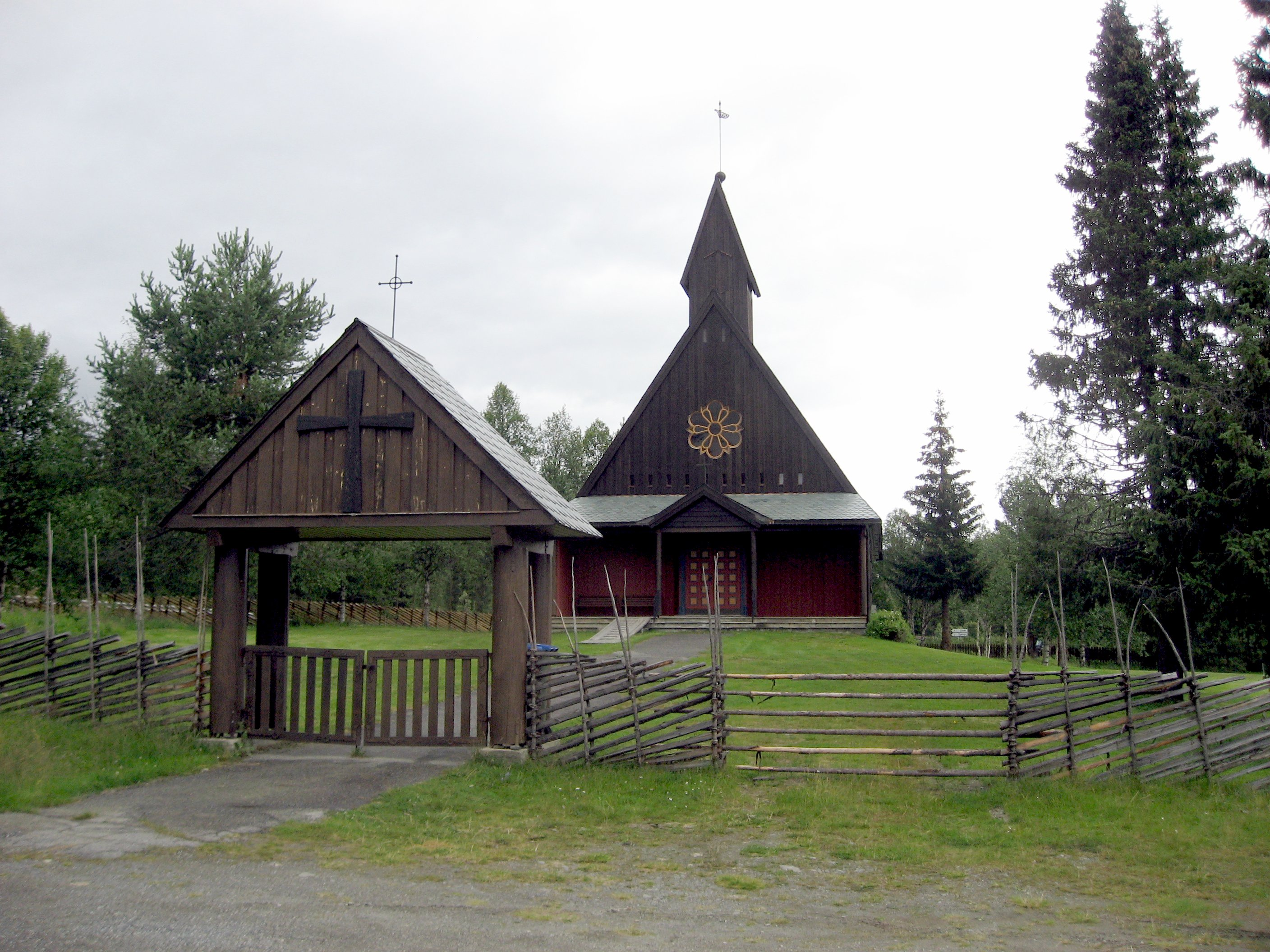
- View of the church
- Tisleidalen Church
- 60°52′09″N 9°13′03″E
- Location: Nord-Aurdal, Innlandet
- Country: Norway
- Denomination: Church of Norway
- Churchmanship: Evangelical Lutheran

History
- Status: Parish church
- Founded: 1957
- Consecrated: 1958

Architecture
- Functional status: Active
- Architect: Karl Stenersen
- Architectural type: Long church
- Completed: 1957 (69 years ago)

Specifications
- Capacity: 130
- Materials: Wood

Administration
- Diocese: Hamar bispedømme
- Deanery: Valdres prosti
- Parish: Tisleidalen
- Norwegian Cultural Heritage Site
- Type: Church
- Status: Not protected
- ID: 85626

Tisleidalen Church (Norwegian: Tisleidalen kirke) is a parish church of the Church of Norway in Nord-Aurdal Municipality in Innlandet county, Norway. It is located in the village of Hovda. It is the church for the Tisleidalen parish which is part of the Valdres prosti (deanery) in the Diocese of Hamar. The brown, wooden church was built in a long church design in 1958 using plans drawn up by the architect Karl Stenersen. The church seats about 130 people.

== History ==
Starting in 1929, there was a local initiative to build a chapel in the Tisleidalen area. This initiative was put on hold for many years due to World War II. In 1943, a plot of land in Hovda was donated for the purposes of building a cemetery. The cemetery was consecrated and put into use in 1949. On 29 August 1952, permission was given to build an annex chapel at the cemetery. The chapel was designed by Karl Stenersen. The new "Tisleidalen Chapel" was built in 1957 and consecrated in 1958. It was an annex chapel under the main Aurdal Church. In 1996, the chapel was upgraded to parish church status and it was titled "Tisleidalen Church".

== See also ==
- List of churches in Hamar
