= Nord-Aurdal Municipality =

Municipality in Innlandet, Norway

Nord-Aurdal Municipality Nord-Aurdal kommune
- Municipality
- Nordre Aurdal herred (historic name)
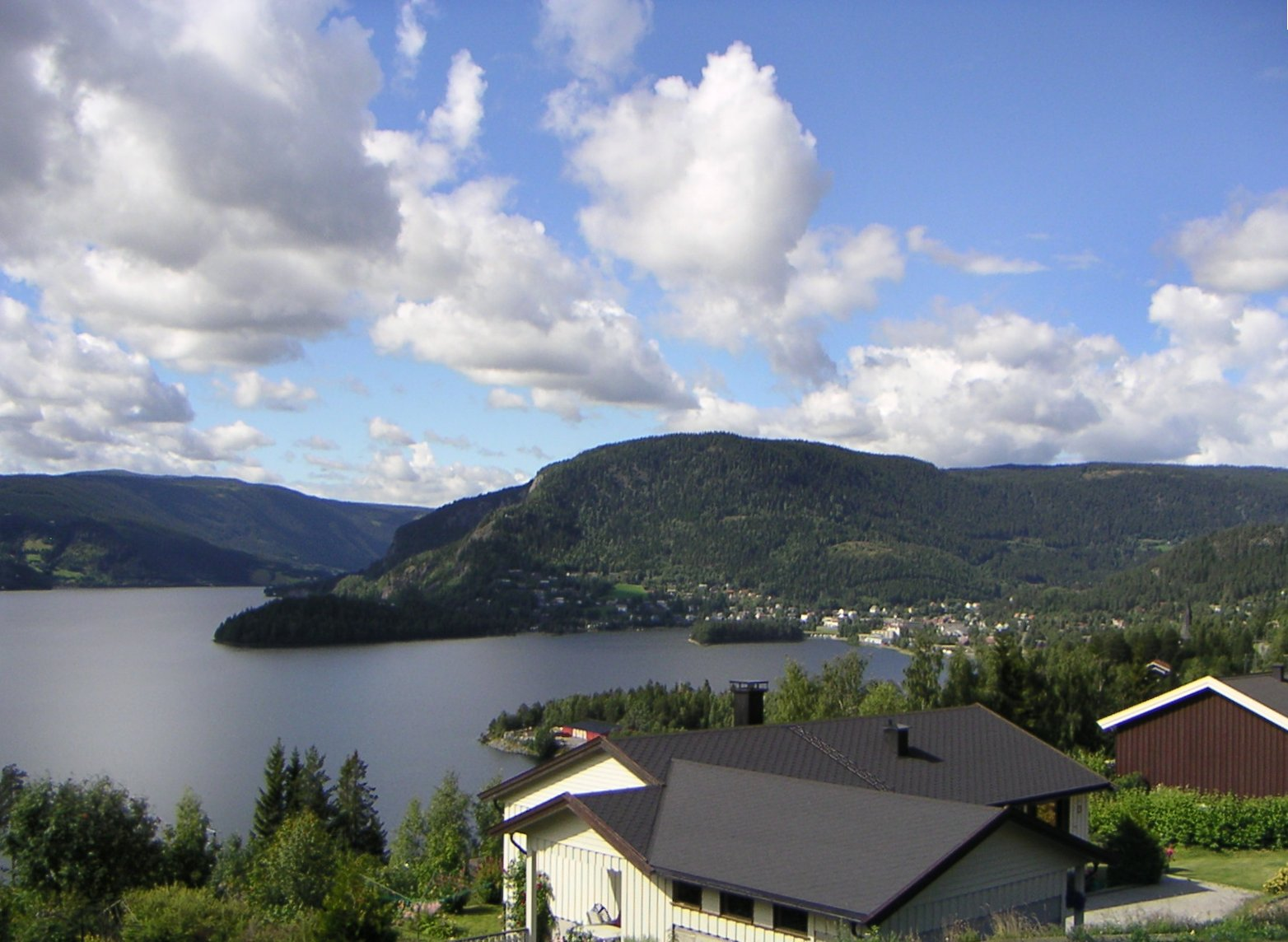
- View over Strandefjorden, with Fagernes to the right

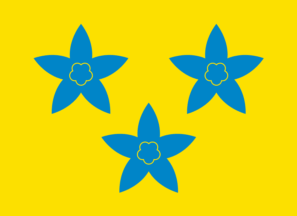
- Flag Coat of arms

- Innlandet within Norway

- Nord-Aurdal within Innlandet
- Coordinates: 60°57′35″N 9°15′51″E
- Country: Norway
- County: Innlandet
- District: Valdres
- Established: 1 Jan 1838
  - Created as: Formannskapsdistrikt
- Administrative centre: Fagernes

Government
  - Mayor (2019): Knut Arne Fjelltun (Sp)

Area
  - Total: 906.47 km^{2} (349.99 sq mi)
  - Land: 849.13 km^{2} (327.85 sq mi)
  - Water: 57.34 km^{2} (22.14 sq mi) 6.3%
  - Rank: #128 in Norway
- Highest elevation: 1,325.13 m (4,347.5 ft)

Population (2025)
  - Total: 6,455
  - Rank: #154 in Norway
  - Density: 7.1/km^{2} (18/sq mi)
  - Change (10 years): ▲ +2.3%
- Demonym: Nordaurdøl

Official language
  - Norwegian form: Neutral
- Time zone: UTC+01:00 (CET)
  - Summer (DST): UTC+02:00 (CEST)
- ISO 3166 code: NO-3451
- Website: Official website

Nord-Aurdal is a municipality in Innlandet county, Norway. It is located in the traditional district of Valdres. The administrative centre of the municipality is the town of Fagernes. Other urban centres in Nord-Aurdal include the villages of Aurdal, Leira, and Skrautvål. The municipality is served by Fagernes Airport, Leirin. In Nord-Aurdal, there is an alpine skiing center called Valdres Alpinsenter.

The 906.47-square-kilometre (349.99 sq mi) municipality is the 128th largest by area out of the 357 municipalities in Norway. Nord-Aurdal Municipality is the 154th most populous municipality in Norway with a population of 6,455. The municipality's population density is 7.1 inhabitants per square kilometre (18/sq mi) and its population has increased by 2.3% over the previous 10-year period.

== Name ==
The municipality (originally the parish) is named after the Aurdalen valley (Old Norse: Aurardalr) since it was a central geographic feature of the area. The first word in the name is nord which is essentially a prefix that means "north". The second word comes from the local valley name. The first element of that word is the genitive case of the old river name, Aur, now named Bøaelva. The river name comes from the word aurr which means "gravel". The last element of the second word is dalr which means "valley" or "dale". Historically, the name of the municipality was spelled Nordre Aurdal. On 3 November 1917, a royal resolution changed the spelling of the name of the municipality to Nord-Aurdal. Both nordre and nord mean "north" (more specifically, "nordre" means "northern"), so the name Nord-Aurdal means "(the) northern (part of) Aurdal". (The Church of Norway parish of Aurdal that had existed for centuries was divided into two in 1805, just over 30 years before the parish borders were used to defin the new municipality that was established in 1838.)

== Coat of arms ==
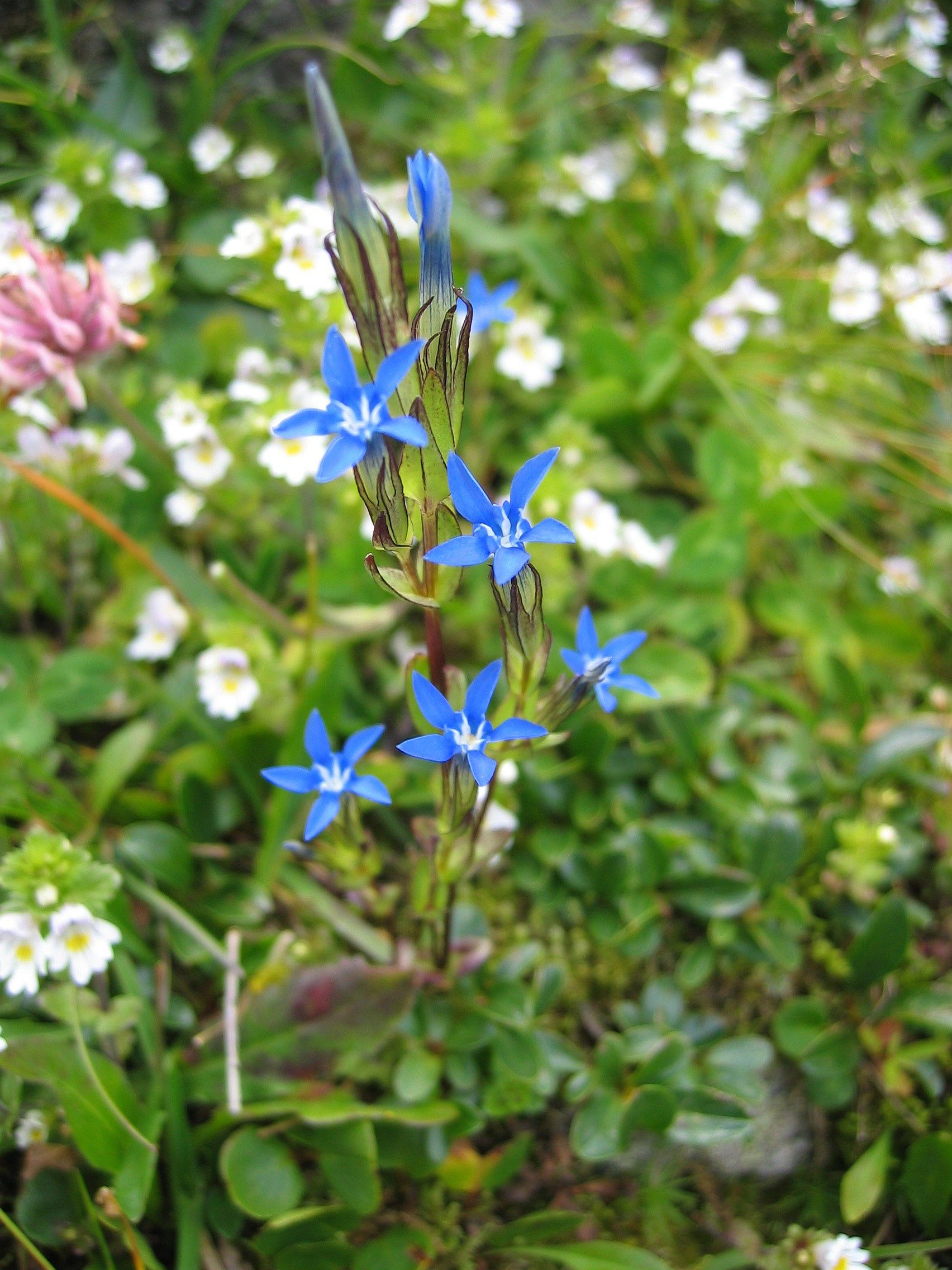
Gentiana nivalis which is the flower depicted on the arms for Nord-Aurdal

The coat of arms was granted by royal decree on 13 December 1985. The official blazon is "Or, three cinquefoils azure" (Norwegian: På gull grunn tre blå fembladingar, 2-1). This means the arms have a field (background) has a tincture of Or which means it is commonly colored yellow, but if it is made out of metal, then gold is used. The charge is three five-petaled flowers. The arms show three blue flowers of the species Gentiana nivalis which are commonly called "Snow Gentian". The flowers, which are locally known as "the blue eyes of Christ", grow all over Norway, but they grow abundantly in this area. Three flowers were chosen to represent the three main settlements of the municipality: Aurdal, Fagernes, and Leira. This type of flower only opens in sunlight and heat, so it was chosen to symbolize being open and positive. The arms were designed by Bjørn Arnesen who based it off an idea by Ivar Aars. The municipal flag has the same design as the coat of arms.

== History ==
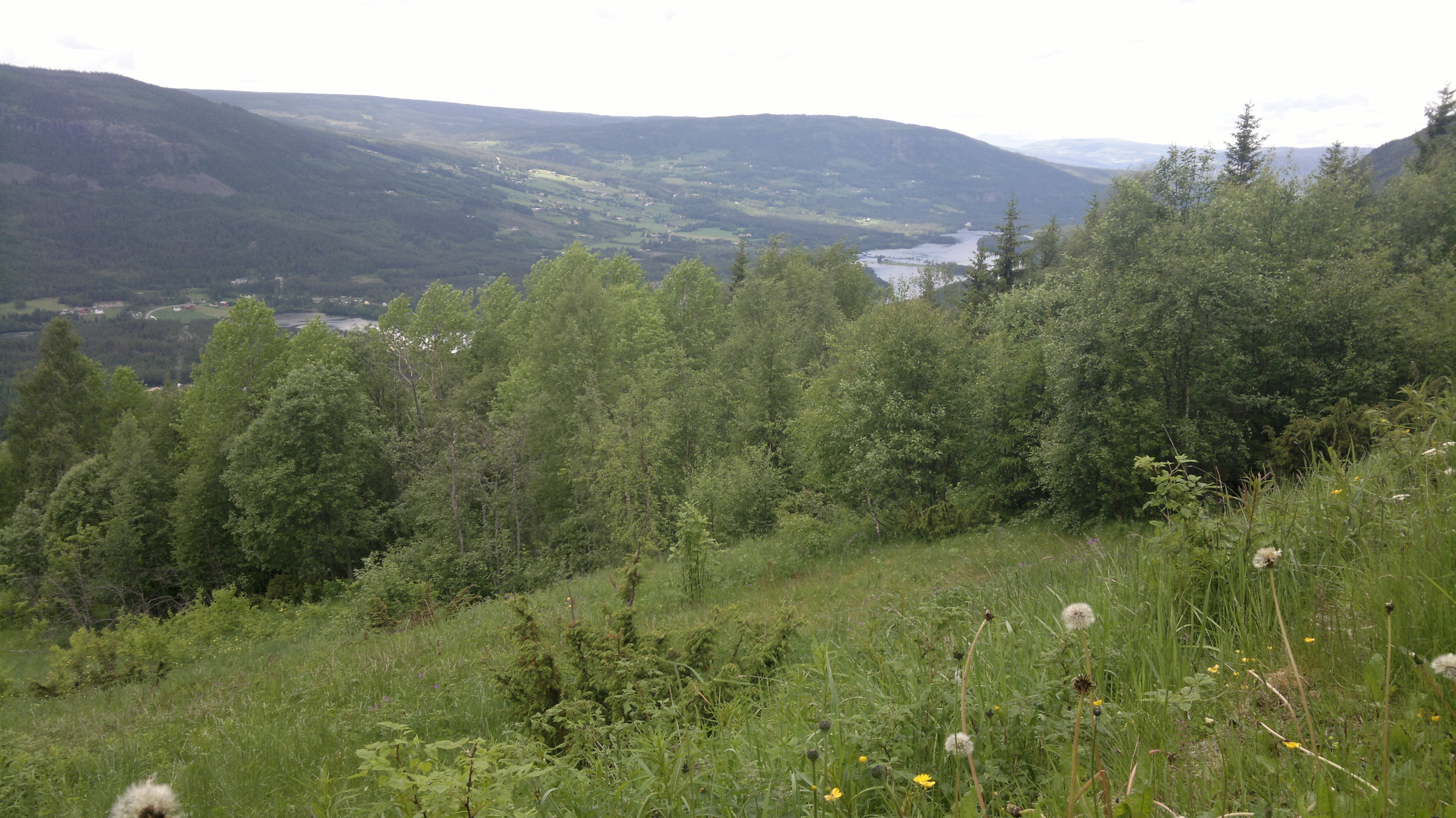
View of the Dokkafjorden area

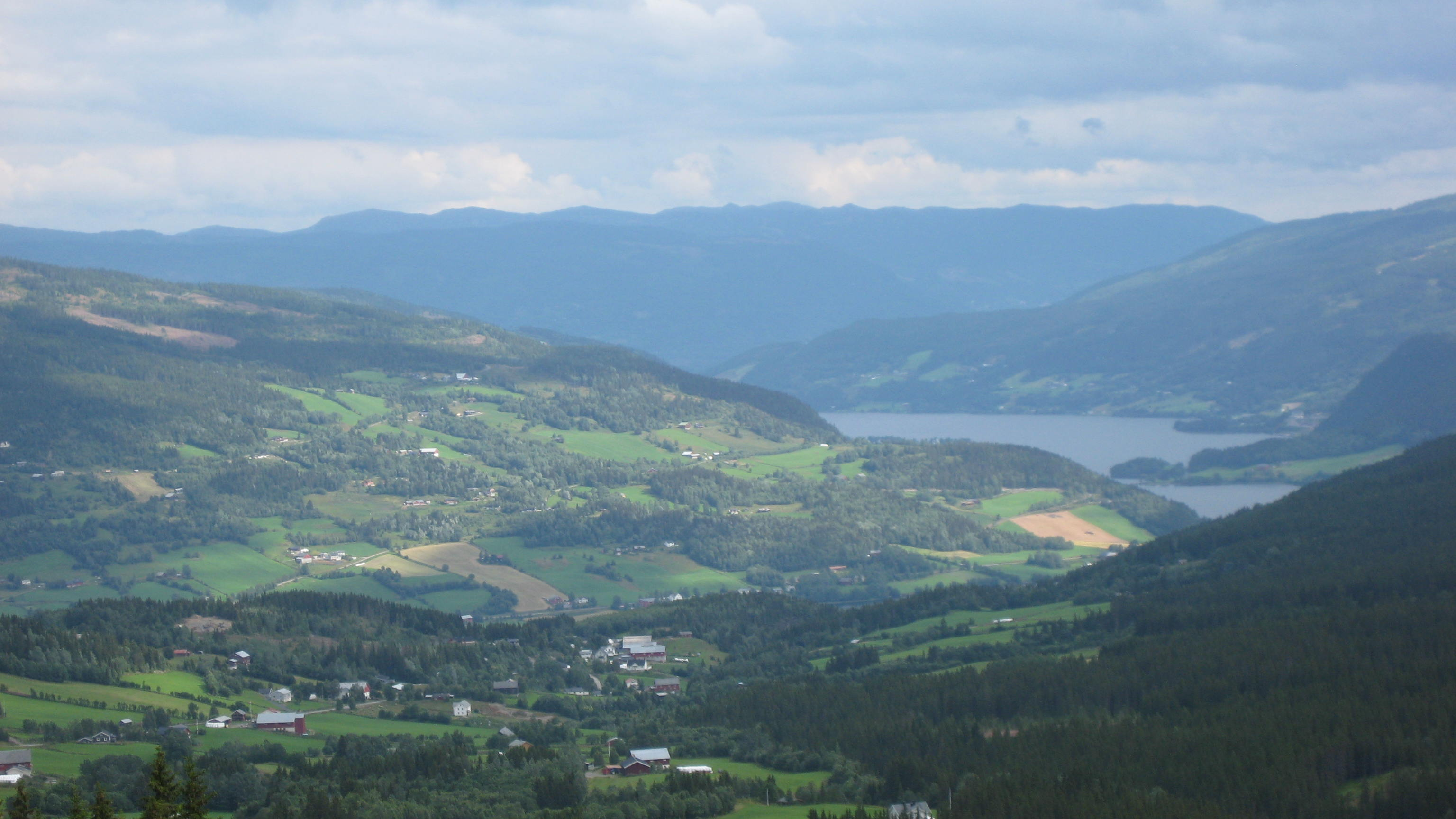
Nord.Aurdal seen from Hippesbygde

The parish of Nordre Aurdal (later spelled Nord-Aurdal) was established as a municipality on 1 January 1838 (see formannskapsdistrikt law).

On 1 January 1894, the new Etnedal Municipality was created by merging the eastern valley area of Nordre Etnedal (population: 362) from Nordre Aurdal Municipality plus the Søndre Etnedal area (population: 1,331) from the neighboring Søndre Aurdal Municipality.

On 1 January 1979, there was a border adjustment in an unpopulated area where part of Etnedal Municipality was transferred to Nord-Aurdal Municipality and another part of Nord-Aurdal Municipality that was transferred to Etnedal Municipality. Then on 1 January 1984, the unpopulated northern side of the Makalausfjellet mountain was transferred from Sør-Aurdal Municipality to Nord-Aurdal Municipality.

Historically, this municipality was part of the old Oppland county. On 1 January 2020, the municipality became a part of the newly-formed Innlandet county (after Hedmark and Oppland counties were merged).

== Geography ==
Number of minorities (1st and 2nd generation) in Nord-Aurdal by country of origin in 2017
Ancestry	Number
Lithuania	81
Poland	73
Romania	62
Netherlands	38
Syria	36
Eritrea	34
Denmark	33

Nord-Aurdal Municipality is located to the north of Sør-Aurdal Municipality, east of Etnedal Municipality and Gausdal Municipality, and south of Øystre Slidre Municipality and Vestre Slidre Municipality. To the west, it is bordered by Hemsedal Municipality and Gol Municipality in Buskerud county. Nord-Aurdal Municipality measures about 52.4 kilometres (32.6 mi) on the north–south axis and 43.3 kilometres (26.9 mi) on the east–west axis.

The municipality lies in the western side of Innlandet county. Although Fagernes is the administrative center of Nord-Aurdal Municipality, the village of Aurdal was the historic centre of the centuries-old Church of Norway parish of Aurdal. Nord-Aurdal Municipality is part of the traditional district of Valdres in the central part of southern Norway, situated between the Gudbrandsdal and Hallingdal valleys.

The highest point in the municipality is the 1,325.13-metre (4,347.5 ft) tall mountain Duptjernkampen, a tri-point on the borders of Nord-Aurdal Municipality, Nordre Land Municipality, and Gausdal Municipality. About 50% of the land is above 900 metres (3,000 ft). The Tisleifjorden and Aurdalsfjorden are large inland lakes that are located in the municipality. The river Begna flows through the municipality as well, with the Strondafjorden being a large lake that the river flows through.

== Climate ==
Climate data for Fagernes in Nord-Aurdal, Valdres 1991-2020 (358 m, extremes 1982-2020)
Month	Jan	Feb	Mar	Apr	May	Jun	Jul	Aug	Sep	Oct	Nov	Dec	Year
Record high °C (°F)	11.6 (52.9)	12.2 (54.0)	15.2 (59.4)	21.5 (70.7)	27.5 (81.5)	31.3 (88.3)	32.3 (90.1)	32.3 (90.1)	26.3 (79.3)	21.7 (71.1)	14.9 (58.8)	11.3 (52.3)	32.3 (90.1)
Mean daily maximum °C (°F)	−3.9 (25.0)	−1.9 (28.6)	3.3 (37.9)	8.8 (47.8)	14.3 (57.7)	18.6 (65.5)	21.2 (70.2)	19.4 (66.9)	14.4 (57.9)	7 (45)	0.9 (33.6)	−3.3 (26.1)	8.2 (46.9)
Daily mean °C (°F)	−7.6 (18.3)	−6.7 (19.9)	−2.4 (27.7)	2.8 (37.0)	8.1 (46.6)	12.8 (55.0)	15.4 (59.7)	13.8 (56.8)	9.4 (48.9)	3.4 (38.1)	−1.8 (28.8)	−6.6 (20.1)	3.4 (38.1)
Mean daily minimum °C (°F)	−11.1 (12.0)	−10.4 (13.3)	−6.4 (20.5)	−1.3 (29.7)	3 (37)	7.8 (46.0)	10.7 (51.3)	9.7 (49.5)	6 (43)	1 (34)	−4.1 (24.6)	−9.6 (14.7)	−0.4 (31.3)
Record low °C (°F)	−36.4 (−33.5)	−34.4 (−29.9)	−29.5 (−21.1)	−18.2 (−0.8)	−4.9 (23.2)	−1.3 (29.7)	1.5 (34.7)	0 (32)	−4.4 (24.1)	−13.4 (7.9)	−23 (−9)	−27.7 (−17.9)	−36.4 (−33.5)
Average precipitation mm (inches)	44.6 (1.76)	26.9 (1.06)	25.1 (0.99)	27.2 (1.07)	55.7 (2.19)	67.2 (2.65)	87.1 (3.43)	88.6 (3.49)	54.6 (2.15)	52.1 (2.05)	53.8 (2.12)	39.9 (1.57)	622.8 (24.53)
Source 1: Norwegian Meteorological Institute
Source 2: NOAA-WMO averages 91-2020 Norway

== Government ==
Nord-Aurdal Municipality is responsible for primary education (through 10th grade), outpatient health services, senior citizen services, welfare and other social services, zoning, economic development, and municipal roads and utilities. The municipality is governed by a municipal council of directly elected representatives. The mayor is indirectly elected by a vote of the municipal council. The municipality is under the jurisdiction of the Vestoppland og Valdres District Court and the Eidsivating Court of Appeal.

=== Municipal council ===
The municipal council (Kommunestyre) of Nord-Aurdal Municipality is made up of 21 representatives that are elected to four year terms. The tables below show the current and historical composition of the council by political party.

Nord-Aurdal kommunestyre 2023–2027
Party name (in Norwegian)	Number of representatives
Labour Party (Arbeiderpartiet)	5
Progress Party (Fremskrittspartiet)	3
Green Party (Miljøpartiet De Grønne)	1
Conservative Party (Høyre)	2
Centre Party (Senterpartiet)	9
Socialist Left Party (Sosialistisk Venstreparti)	1
Total number of members:	21

Nord-Aurdal kommunestyre 2019–2023
Party name (in Norwegian)	Number of representatives
Labour Party (Arbeiderpartiet)	6
Progress Party (Fremskrittspartiet)	2
Conservative Party (Høyre)	2
Centre Party (Senterpartiet)	8
Socialist Left Party (Sosialistisk Venstreparti)	1
Liberal Party (Venstre)	2
Total number of members:	21

Nord-Aurdal kommunestyre 2015–2019
Party name (in Norwegian)	Number of representatives
Labour Party (Arbeiderpartiet)	11
Progress Party (Fremskrittspartiet)	3
Conservative Party (Høyre)	3
Christian Democratic Party (Kristelig Folkeparti)	1
Centre Party (Senterpartiet)	4
Socialist Left Party (Sosialistisk Venstreparti)	1
Liberal Party (Venstre)	2
Total number of members:	25

Nord-Aurdal kommunestyre 2011–2015
Party name (in Norwegian)	Number of representatives
Labour Party (Arbeiderpartiet)	9
Progress Party (Fremskrittspartiet)	4
Conservative Party (Høyre)	4
Centre Party (Senterpartiet)	4
Socialist Left Party (Sosialistisk Venstreparti)	1
Liberal Party (Venstre)	3
Total number of members:	25

Nord-Aurdal kommunestyre 2007–2011
Party name (in Norwegian)	Number of representatives
Labour Party (Arbeiderpartiet)	8
Progress Party (Fremskrittspartiet)	6
Conservative Party (Høyre)	3
Christian Democratic Party (Kristelig Folkeparti)	1
Centre Party (Senterpartiet)	5
Socialist Left Party (Sosialistisk Venstreparti)	1
Liberal Party (Venstre)	1
Total number of members:	25

Nord-Aurdal kommunestyre 2003–2007
Party name (in Norwegian)	Number of representatives
Labour Party (Arbeiderpartiet)	8
Progress Party (Fremskrittspartiet)	4
Conservative Party (Høyre)	3
Christian Democratic Party (Kristelig Folkeparti)	1
Centre Party (Senterpartiet)	6
Socialist Left Party (Sosialistisk Venstreparti)	2
Liberal Party (Venstre)	1
Total number of members:	25

Nord-Aurdal kommunestyre 1999–2003
Party name (in Norwegian)	Number of representatives
Labour Party (Arbeiderpartiet)	9
Progress Party (Fremskrittspartiet)	2
Conservative Party (Høyre)	4
Christian Democratic Party (Kristelig Folkeparti)	1
Centre Party (Senterpartiet)	7
Socialist Left Party (Sosialistisk Venstreparti)	1
Liberal Party (Venstre)	1
Total number of members:	25

Nord-Aurdal kommunestyre 1995–1999
Party name (in Norwegian)	Number of representatives
Labour Party (Arbeiderpartiet)	10
Conservative Party (Høyre)	4
Christian Democratic Party (Kristelig Folkeparti)	1
Centre Party (Senterpartiet)	8
Socialist Left Party (Sosialistisk Venstreparti)	1
Liberal Party (Venstre)	1
Total number of members:	25

Nord-Aurdal kommunestyre 1991–1995
Party name (in Norwegian)	Number of representatives
Labour Party (Arbeiderpartiet)	9
Progress Party (Fremskrittspartiet)	1
Conservative Party (Høyre)	3
Christian Democratic Party (Kristelig Folkeparti)	1
Centre Party (Senterpartiet)	8
Socialist Left Party (Sosialistisk Venstreparti)	2
Liberal Party (Venstre)	1
Total number of members:	25

Nord-Aurdal kommunestyre 1987–1991
Party name (in Norwegian)	Number of representatives
Labour Party (Arbeiderpartiet)	12
Conservative Party (Høyre)	5
Christian Democratic Party (Kristelig Folkeparti)	1
Centre Party (Senterpartiet)	6
Liberal Party (Venstre)	1
Total number of members:	25

Nord-Aurdal kommunestyre 1983–1987
Party name (in Norwegian)	Number of representatives
Labour Party (Arbeiderpartiet)	11
Progress Party (Fremskrittspartiet)	1
Conservative Party (Høyre)	5
Christian Democratic Party (Kristelig Folkeparti)	2
Centre Party (Senterpartiet)	5
Liberal Party (Venstre)	1
Total number of members:	25

Nord-Aurdal kommunestyre 1979–1983
Party name (in Norwegian)	Number of representatives
Labour Party (Arbeiderpartiet)	10
Conservative Party (Høyre)	5
Christian Democratic Party (Kristelig Folkeparti)	3
Centre Party (Senterpartiet)	7
Total number of members:	25

Nord-Aurdal kommunestyre 1975–1979
Party name (in Norwegian)	Number of representatives
Labour Party (Arbeiderpartiet)	11
Conservative Party (Høyre)	3
Christian Democratic Party (Kristelig Folkeparti)	3
Centre Party (Senterpartiet)	8
Total number of members:	25

Nord-Aurdal kommunestyre 1971–1975
Party name (in Norwegian)	Number of representatives
Labour Party (Arbeiderpartiet)	12
Conservative Party (Høyre)	2
Christian Democratic Party (Kristelig Folkeparti)	2
Centre Party (Senterpartiet)	8
Liberal Party (Venstre)	1
Total number of members:	25

Nord-Aurdal kommunestyre 1967–1971
Party name (in Norwegian)	Number of representatives
Labour Party (Arbeiderpartiet)	12
Conservative Party (Høyre)	2
Christian Democratic Party (Kristelig Folkeparti)	1
Centre Party (Senterpartiet)	9
Liberal Party (Venstre)	1
Total number of members:	25

Nord-Aurdal kommunestyre 1963–1967
Party name (in Norwegian)	Number of representatives
Labour Party (Arbeiderpartiet)	12
Conservative Party (Høyre)	2
Christian Democratic Party (Kristelig Folkeparti)	2
Centre Party (Senterpartiet)	8
Joint List(s) of Non-Socialist Parties (Borgerlige Felleslister)	1
Total number of members:	25

Nord-Aurdal herredsstyre 1959–1963
Party name (in Norwegian)	Number of representatives
Labour Party (Arbeiderpartiet)	11
Conservative Party (Høyre)	3
Christian Democratic Party (Kristelig Folkeparti)	2
Joint List(s) of Non-Socialist Parties (Borgerlige Felleslister)	9
Total number of members:	25

Nord-Aurdal herredsstyre 1955–1959
Party name (in Norwegian)	Number of representatives
Labour Party (Arbeiderpartiet)	11
Conservative Party (Høyre)	2
Christian Democratic Party (Kristelig Folkeparti)	3
Joint List(s) of Non-Socialist Parties (Borgerlige Felleslister)	9
Total number of members:	25

Nord-Aurdal herredsstyre 1951–1955
Party name (in Norwegian)	Number of representatives
Labour Party (Arbeiderpartiet)	10
Christian Democratic Party (Kristelig Folkeparti)	3
Joint List(s) of Non-Socialist Parties (Borgerlige Felleslister)	12
Total number of members:	25

Nord-Aurdal herredsstyre 1947–1951
Party name (in Norwegian)	Number of representatives
Labour Party (Arbeiderpartiet)	8
Joint List(s) of Non-Socialist Parties (Borgerlige Felleslister)	17
Total number of members:	24

Nord-Aurdal herredsstyre 1945–1947
Party name (in Norwegian)	Number of representatives
Labour Party (Arbeiderpartiet)	10
Joint List(s) of Non-Socialist Parties (Borgerlige Felleslister)	15
Total number of members:	25

Nord-Aurdal herredsstyre 1937–1940*
Party name (in Norwegian)	Number of representatives
Labour Party (Arbeiderpartiet)	8
Joint list of the Liberal Party (Venstre) and the Radical People's Party (Radikale Folkepartiet)	1
Joint List(s) of Non-Socialist Parties (Borgerlige Felleslister)	16
Total number of members:	25
Note: Due to the German occupation of Norway during World War II, no elections were held for new municipal councils until after the war ended in 1945.

=== Mayors ===
The mayor (Norwegian: ordfører) of Nord-Aurdal Municipality is the political leader of the municipality and the chairperson of the municipal council. Here is a list of people who have held this position:

- 1838–1839: Amund Wessel Kolderup
- 1840–1841: Thore S. Belgum
- 1842–1845: Torger Melbye
- 1846–1849: Amund Wessel Kolderup
- 1850–1853: Thore S. Belgum
- 1854–1859: Jean Marie L'Abee
- 1860–1865: Nils Frydenlund
- 1866–1881: Erik Kjørstad
- 1882–1901: Ole Skrutvold
- 1902–1907: O.T. Svennæs
- 1908–1913: Th. Aaberg
- 1914–1919: O.T. Svennæs
- 1920–1926: Erik Strand
- 1926–1945: Ivar Simensen
- 1946–1971: Asbjørn Granheim (Sp)
- 1972–1981: Nils T. Døvre (KrF)
- 1982–1987: Lage Westerbø (Sp)
- 1988–2003: Ola N. Døvre (Sp)
- 2003–2007: Svein Erik Hilmen (Sp)
- 2007–2011: Helge Halvorsen (Ap)
- 2011–2019: Inger Torun Klosbøle (Ap)
- 2019–present: Knut Arne Fjelltun (Sp)

== Culture ==
=== Churches ===
The Church of Norway has six parishes (sokn) within Nord-Aurdal Municipality. It is part of the Valdres prosti (deanery) in the Diocese of Hamar.

Churches in Nord-Aurdal Municipality
Parish (sokn)	Church name	Location of the church	Year built
Aurdal	Aurdal Church	Aurdal	1737
Skrautvål	Skrautvål Church	Skrautvål	1785
Svenes	Strand Church	Synnstrond	1735
Tingnes	Tingnes Church	Fagernes	1972
Tisleidalen	Tisleidalen Church	Hovda	1957
Ulnes	Ulnes Church	Ulnes	1250

== Attractions ==
The Valdres Folkemuseum is located just outside Fagernes and has large collections of old houses, textiles, and music instruments.

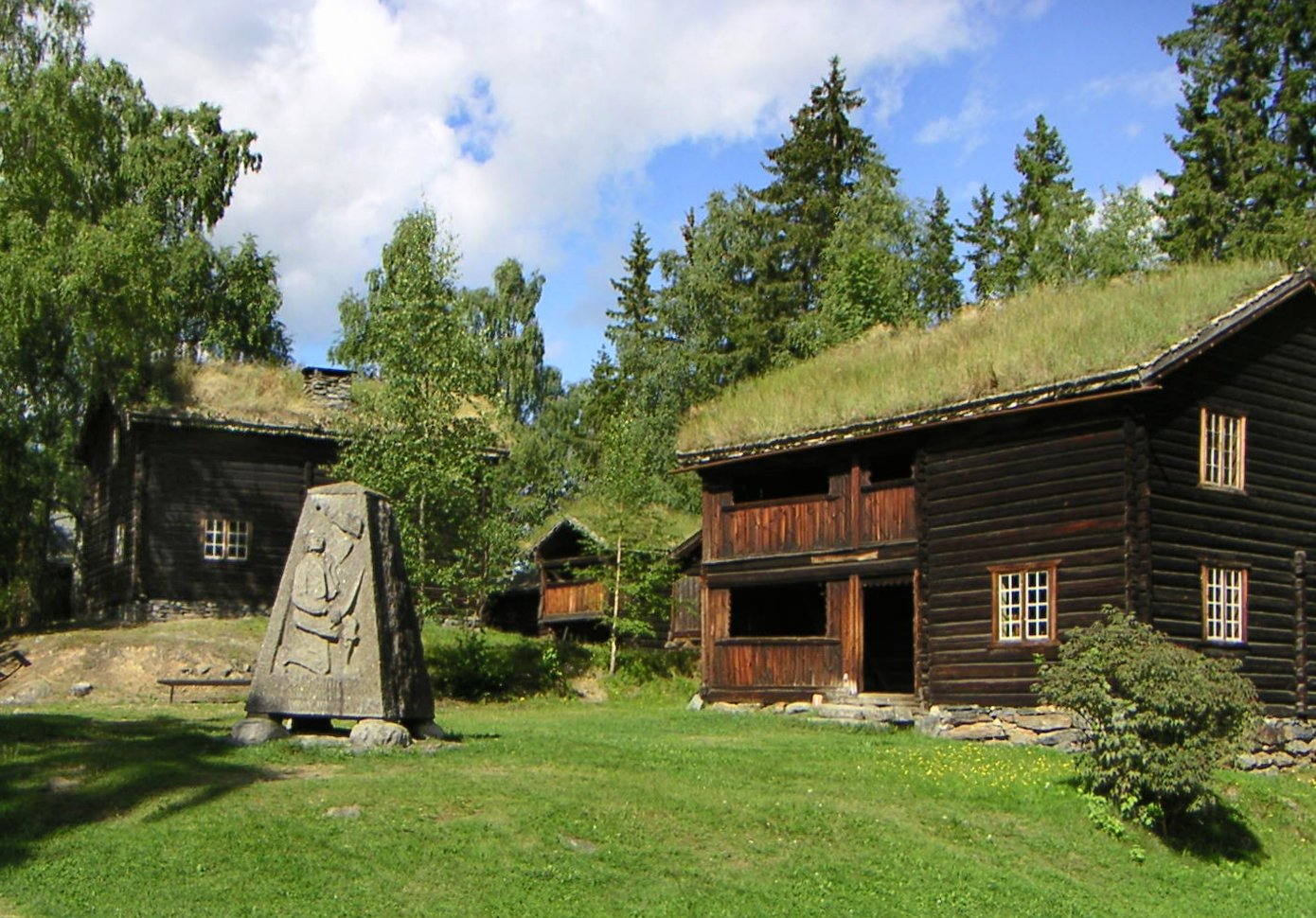
Valdres Folkemuseum

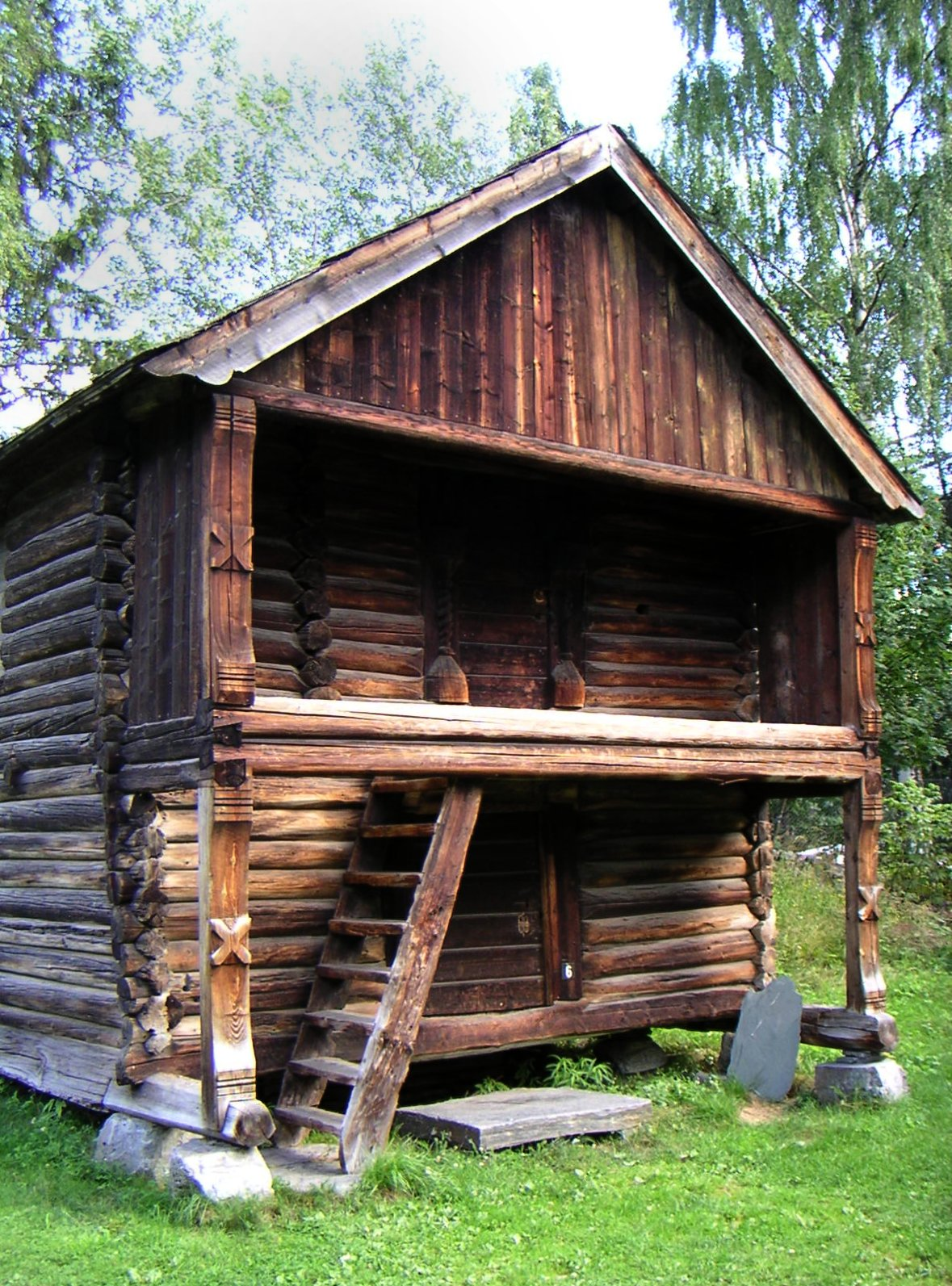
Valdres Museum

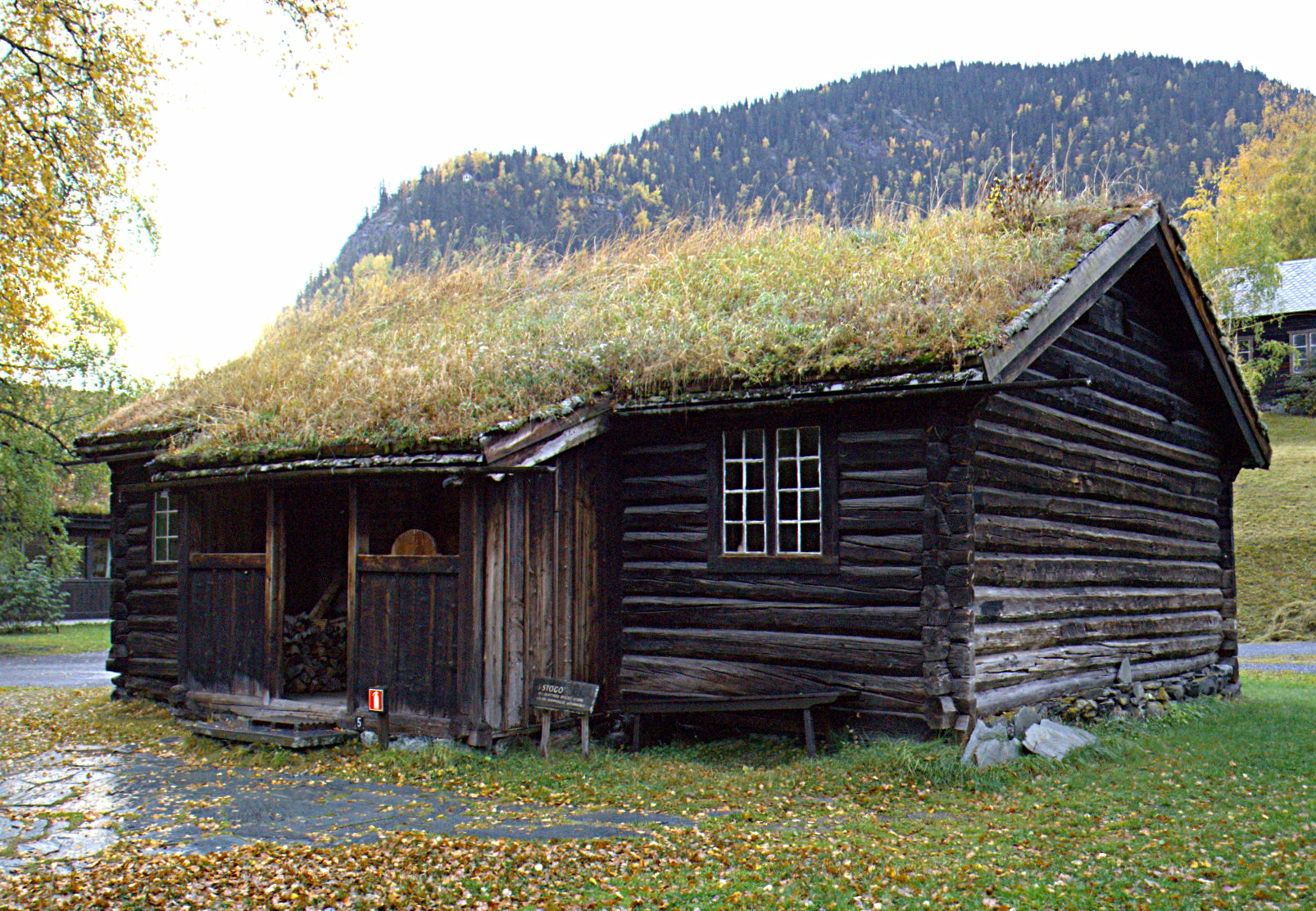
Skattebustugu

== Notable people ==
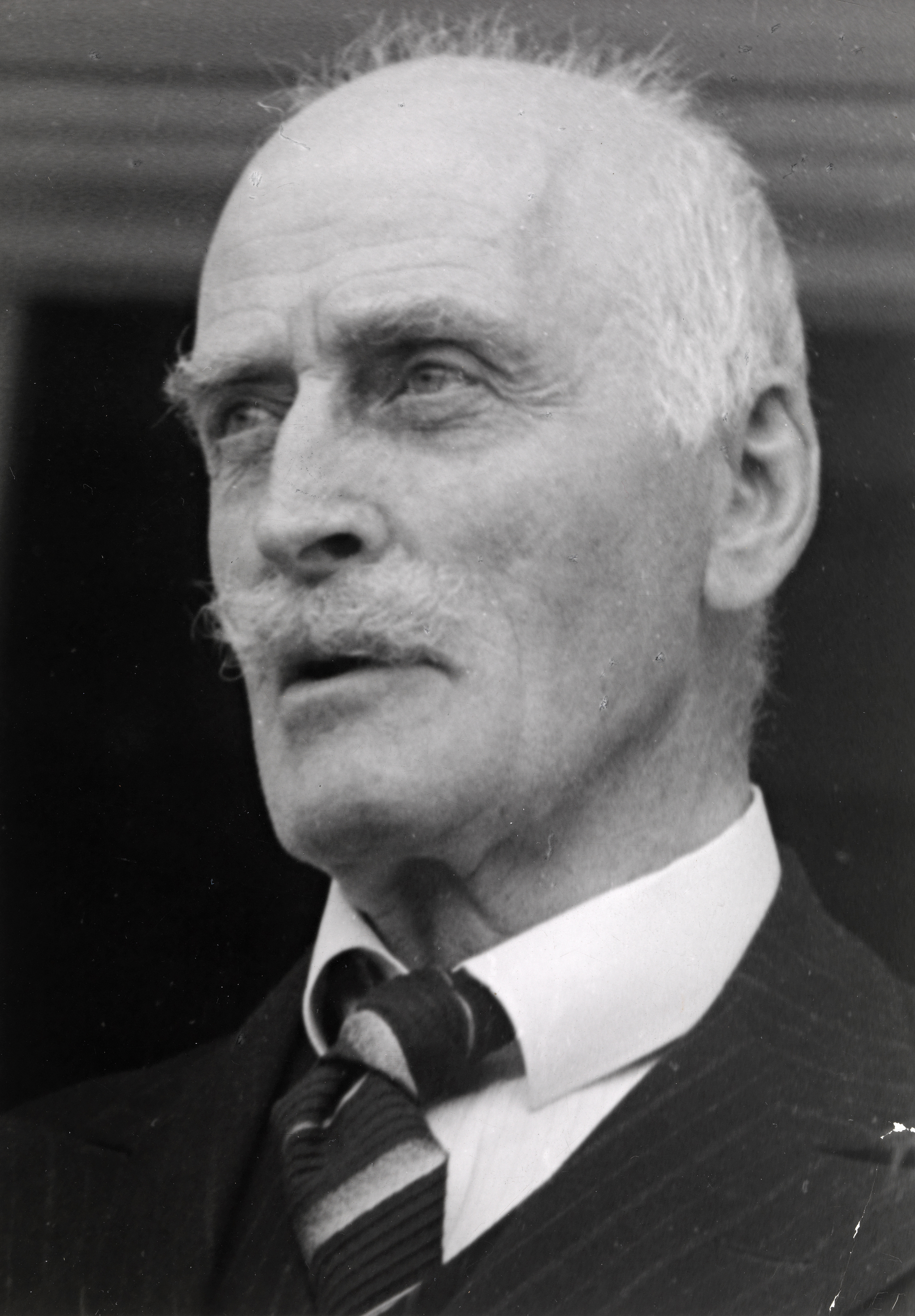
Knut Hamsun, 1939

- J. C. M. Hanson (1864–1943), an American librarian and author
- Kaare Strøm (1902–1967), a limnologist
- Olav Meisdalshagen (1903–1959), a Norwegian politician who was Minister of Finance from 1947-1951 and Minister of Agriculture from 1955-1956
- Asbjørn Granheim (1906–1977), a Norwegian politician who was mayor of Nord-Aurdal from 1945-1971
- Inger Helene Nybråten (born 1960), a former cross-country skier, gold medalist at the 1984 Winter Olympics, and twice silver medallist at the 1992 and 1994 Winter Olympics
- Eldbjørg Hemsing (born 1990), a classical violinist
- Guro Kleven Hagen (born 1994), a violinist, the 1st concertmaster at the Norwegian National Opera and Ballet
- Sylfest Glimsdal (born 1966), a former biathlete who competed at three Summer Olympics

== International relations ==
=== Twin towns — Sister cities ===
Nord-Aurdal has sister city agreements with the following places:

- - Kouvola, Etelä-Suomi, Finland
- - Lidköping, Västra Götaland County, Sweden
- - Skanderborg, Region Midtjylland, Denmark
