= Skrautvål =

Village in Nord-Aurdal Municipality, Norway

- Village
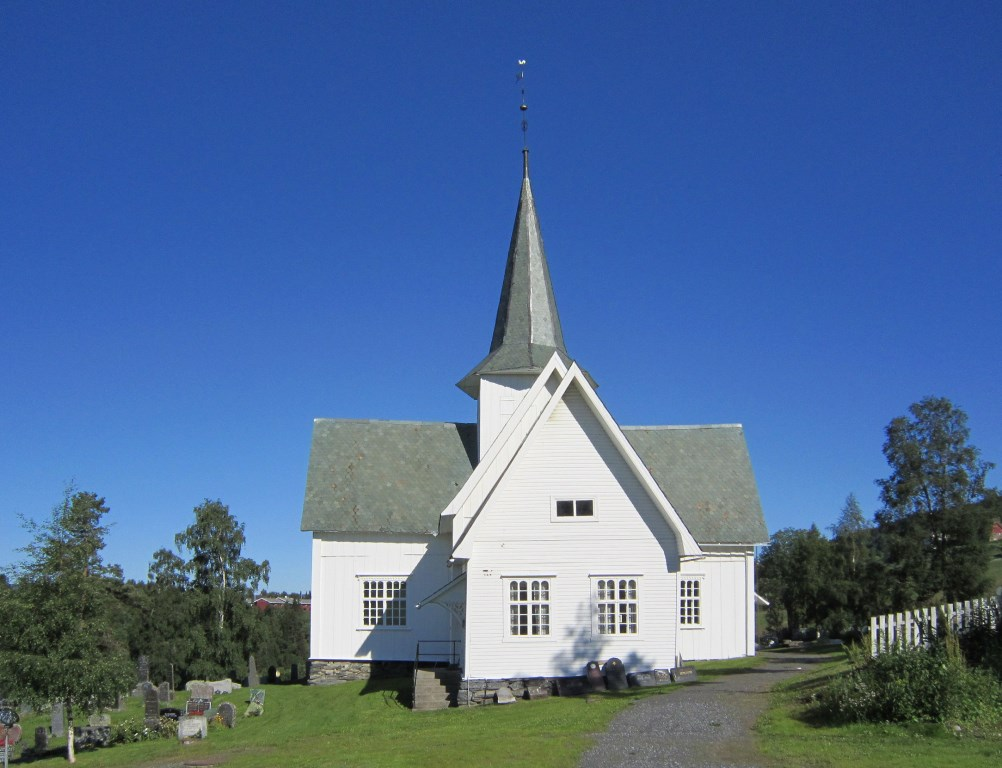
- View of the village church, Skrautvål Church
- Interactive map of Skrautvål
- Location within Innlandet Location within Norway
- Coordinates: 61.0331°N 9.20881°E
- Country: Norway
- Region: Eastern Norway
- County: Innlandet
- District: Valdres
- Municipality: Nord-Aurdal Municipality
- Elevation: 607 m (1,991 ft)
- Time zone: UTC+01:00 (CET)
  - Summer (DST): UTC+02:00 (CEST)
- Post Code: 2917 Skrautvål

Skrautvål is a village in Nord-Aurdal Municipality in Innlandet county, Norway. The village is located about 5 kilometres (3.1 mi) north of the town of Fagernes and just northeast of the lake Sæbufjorden. Skrautvål Church is located in the village.

== Notable people ==
- Inger Helene Nybråten, a prominent member of the local sports team is Skrautvål IL
- Olav Meisdalshagen, a Norwegian politician who grew up just north of Skrautvål.
