= Erika Lundmoen =

Russian singer (born 1997)

Erika Lundmoen Эрика Хансовна Лундмоен
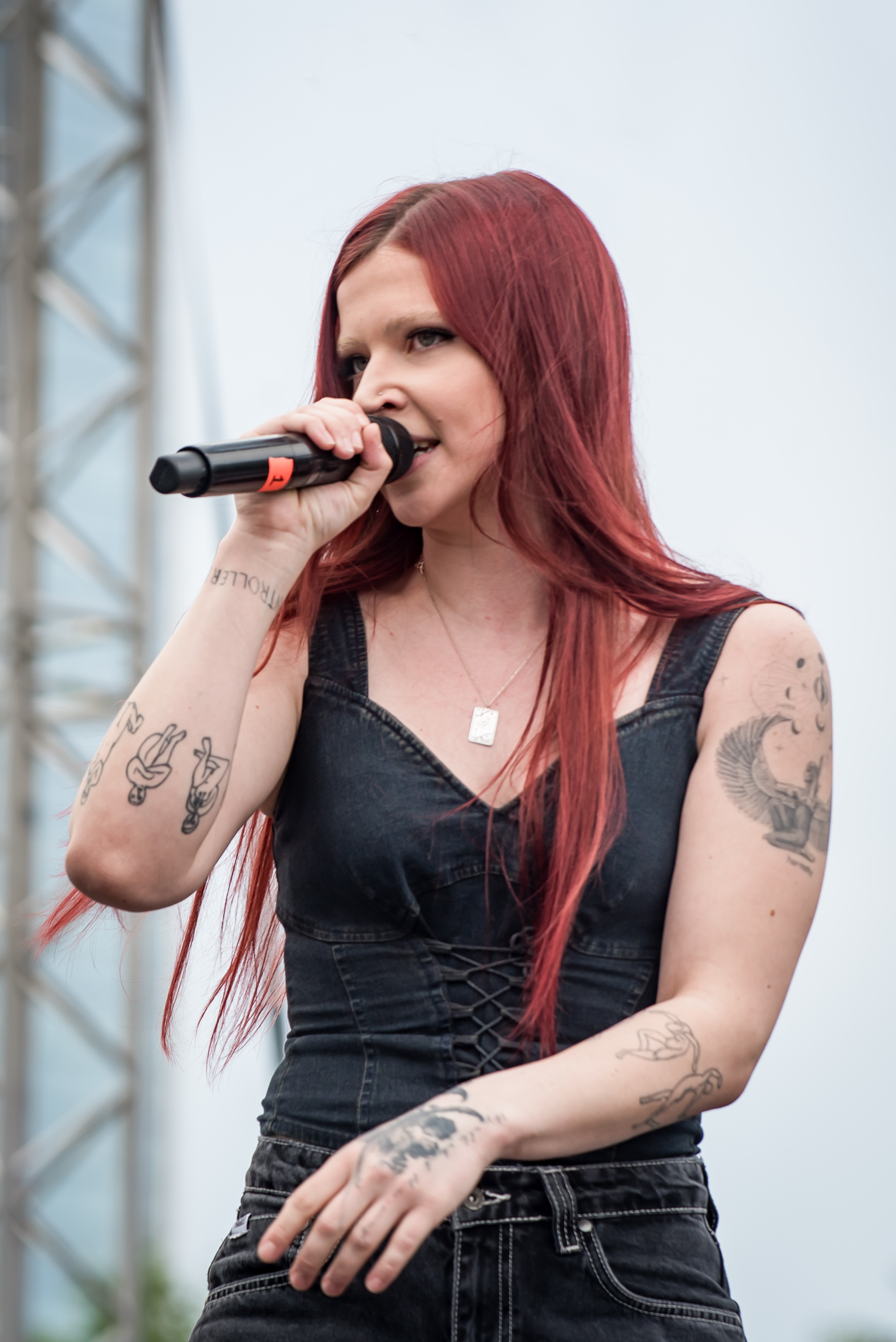
- Erika Lundmoen at VK Fest 2023 in St. Petersburg

Background information
- Born: Erika Hansovna Lundmoen; 21 September 1997 (age 28); Fagernes, Norway
- Origin: Russia
- Genres: Hip-hop; pop
- Occupations: Singer; songwriter
- Years active: 2016–present
- Labels: RDS Records; MLBC; Sounds Good Lab; Universal Music
- Website: erikalundmoen.com

Erika Hansovna Lundmoen (Russian: Эрика Хансовна Лундмоен; born 21 September 1997) is a Norwegian-born Russian singer. From an early age, she moved to Russia and learned music.

She has published 3 albums, 22 singles, 5 features, and 5 music videos.

== Early life ==
Lundmoen was born in Fagernes, Norway on 21 September 1997. Her father owned a farm and petrol station. As a result of conflict between her parents—at the age of six—she moved with her mother to Russia whilst her brother remained with her father in Norway. As an 11-year-old, her and her mother moved to the region of Chelyabinsk; three years later relocating to the city of Chelyabinsk.

== Discography ==
Lundmoen's discography is as follows:

=== Albums ===
Original title	Title in English	Release	Label	Format
Источник	Historian	26 April 2019	MLBS	Digital distribution
22	22	28 August 2020	Sounds Good Lab	Digital distribution
МИРРА	MIRRA	19 May 2023	Erika Lundmoen	Digital distribution

=== Singles ===
Original title	Title in English	Release
In My Galaxy		8 April 2016
Оторваться от земли	Get off the ground	28 October 2016
Без тебя спать	Sleep without you	13 October 2017
Глубина	Depth	18 November 2017
Много фальши	Lots of falsehood	1 December 2017
Мир нас накажет	The world will punish us	15 December 2017
С нас довольно	We've had enough	17 April 2018
Медовым закатом	Honey sunset	17 April 2018
Яд	Poison	31 April 2018
кривые зеркала	Distorting mirrors	7 February 2019
Melancholy		11 October 2019
Меланхолия»	Melancholy	11 October 2019
Кратко	Short	28 November 2019
Милая	Darling	20 March 2020
В Темноте	In the darkness	17 July 2020
Сестра	Sister	15 September 2020
Луна	Moon	7 May 2021
Токсик	Toxic	27 August 2021
Двойной со льдом	Double with ice	3 December 2021
ФЕРРА	FERRA	21 April 2023
ПРИДЁТСЯ МОЛЧАТЬ	Will have to be silent	5 May 2023
глаза цвета зари	Eyes the colour of dawn	12 May 2023

Features

Original title	Title in English	Release
За домами	Behind the houses	5 April 2019
Отпусти меня	Let me go	1 November 2019
Krylyami		20 March 2020
Sleep Without You		3 May 2020
+100500		20 November 2020
Яд (with Alekisok)	Poison	18 June 2024

== Videography ==
Year	Original title	Title in English	Director
2018	Глубина	Depth	n/a
2018	Яд	Poison	Roman Varnin
2019	За домами (совместно с Мальбэком × Сюзанной)	Behind the houses	Roman Varnin
2020	Милая	Darling	Maria Makovskaya
2020	Следы от самолётов	Airplane tracks	Maria Makovskaya
