= Aurdal =

Village in Nord-Aurdal Municipality, Norway

- Village
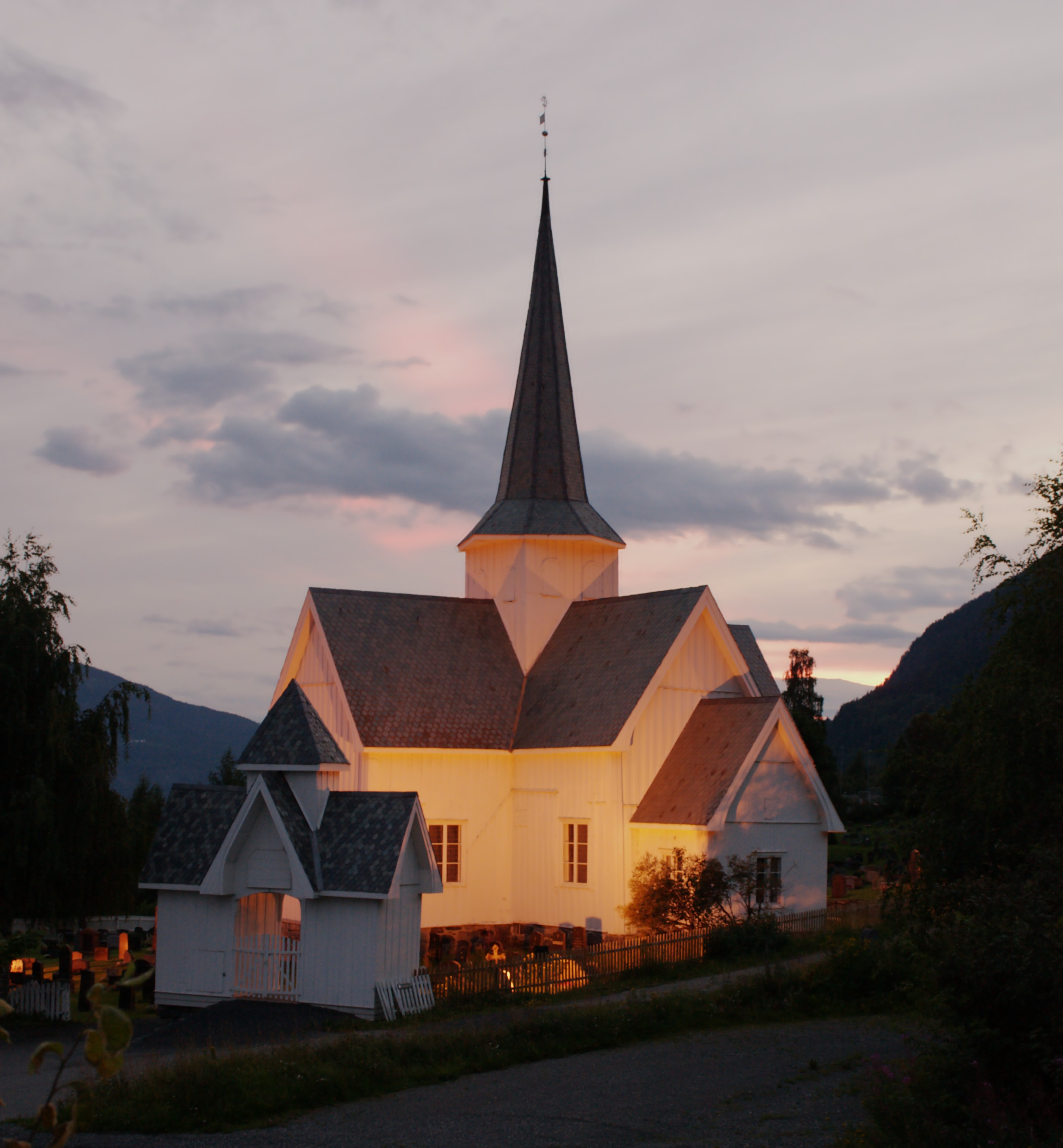
- View of the village church
- Interactive map of Aurdal
- Location within Innlandet Location within Norway
- Coordinates: 60.92443°N 9.41488°E
- Country: Norway
- Region: Eastern Norway
- County: Innlandet
- District: Valdres
- Municipality: Nord-Aurdal Municipality

Area
  - Total: 0.83 km^{2} (0.32 sq mi)
- Elevation: 457 m (1,499 ft)

Population (2024)
  - Total: 674
  - Density: 812/km^{2} (2,100/sq mi)
- Time zone: UTC+01:00 (CET)
  - Summer (DST): UTC+02:00 (CEST)
- Post Code: 2910 Aurdal

Aurdal is a village in Nord-Aurdal Municipality in Innlandet county, Norway. The village is located along the European route E16 highway about 12 kilometres (7.5 mi) to the northwest of the village of Bagn (in Sør-Aurdal Municipality) and about 10 kilometres (6.2 mi) to the southeast of the town of Fagernes and the village of Leira. The river Begna flows past Aurdal, just south of the village. Aurdal Church is located in the village.

The 0.83-square-kilometre (210-acre) village has a population (2024) of 674 and a population density of 812 inhabitants per square kilometre (2,100/sq mi).
