= Strand Church (Nord-Aurdal) =

Church in Innlandet, Norway

- Strand kirke
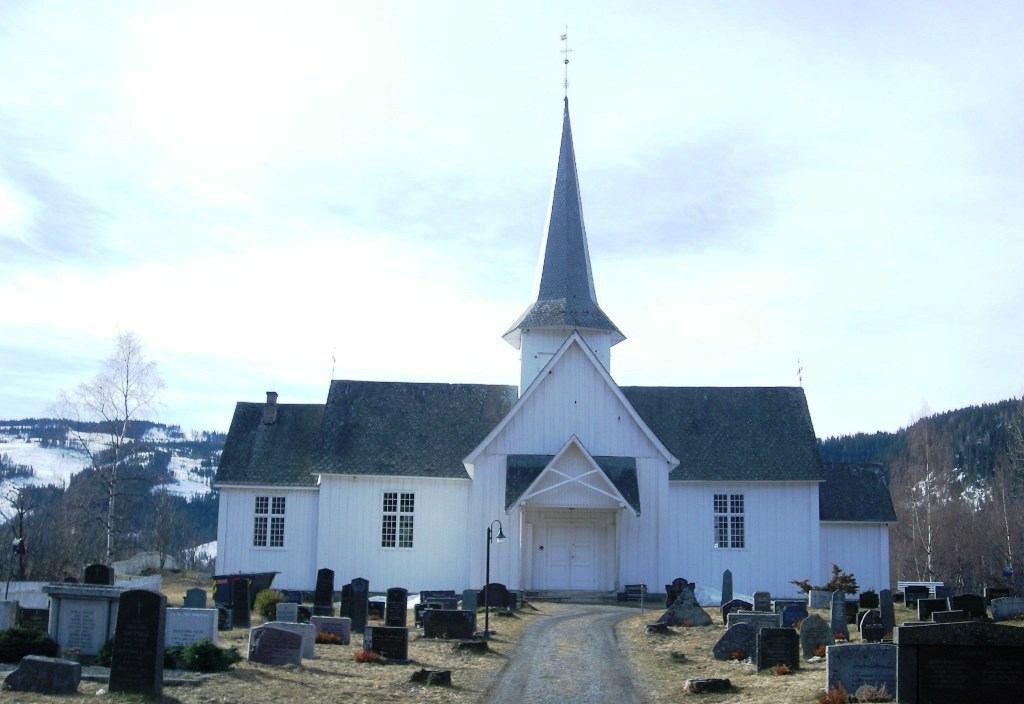
- View of the church
- Strand Church
- 60°58′32″N 9°10′56″E
- Location: Nord-Aurdal, Innlandet
- Country: Norway
- Denomination: Church of Norway
- Previous denomination: Catholic Church
- Churchmanship: Evangelical Lutheran

History
- Former name: Svenes kirke
- Status: Parish church
- Founded: 13th century
- Consecrated: 17 October 1860
- Events: 1860: Moved church

Architecture
- Functional status: Active
- Architectural type: Cruciform
- Completed: 1735 (291 years ago)

Specifications
- Capacity: 230
- Materials: Wood

Administration
- Diocese: Hamar bispedømme
- Deanery: Valdres prosti
- Parish: Svenes
- Norwegian Cultural Heritage Site
- Type: Church
- Status: Automatically protected
- ID: 85015

Strand Church (Norwegian: Strand kirke) is a parish church of the Church of Norway in Nord-Aurdal Municipality in Innlandet county, Norway. It is located in the village of Synnstrond. It is the church for the Svenes parish which is part of the Valdres prosti (deanery) in the Diocese of Hamar. The white, wooden church was built in a cruciform design in 1735 using plans drawn up by an unknown architect and then it was disassembled, moved, and rebuilt in 1860. The church seats about 230 people.

== History ==
The earliest existing historical records of the church date back to the year 1307, but the church was not built that year. The first church was a wooden stave church that was likely built during the 13th century. This church was built on the Svenes farm, about 3.5 kilometres (2.2 mi) northwest of the present church site. This church was known as Svenes Church. Not much is known about that building. During the 1500s, the old stave church had a fire and burned, but it was rebuilt soon afterwards.

In 1702, the church was so rotten that the parish asked for permission to build a new church. While they waited for permission, timber was cut and delivered to the church site. The timber laid at the site for a long time, and the fear was that by the time permission was granted that the wood would no longer be good. The old church was torn down around 1733. Work on the new church took place in 1734 and it was consecrated by the bishop in 1735. The new church was a cruciform log building with small windows. The church had a tower at the west entrance and there was no sacristy.

The old church site was on the outskirts of the parish, and in the middle of the 19th century the idea of moving the church was brought up on several occasions. The decision was finally made in 1858. In 1860, the old church was disassembled and moved about 3.5 kilometres (2.2 mi) to the southeast to Synnstrond so it would be more centrally located within the parish. At the new site, the church was rebuilt, roughly following the same design, although it was necessary to replace part of the timber. This time, the tower was built over the centre of the nave rather than on the west end. The church has a choir in the eastern cross arm and a new sacristy was built on the east end of the choir. A new church porch was built on the west end of the nave. The interior and exterior were all paneled to cover up the log building. The newly rebuilt church was consecrated on 17 October 1860 at since that time, it has been known as Strand Church, but the parish kept the historical name Svenes.

== Media gallery ==
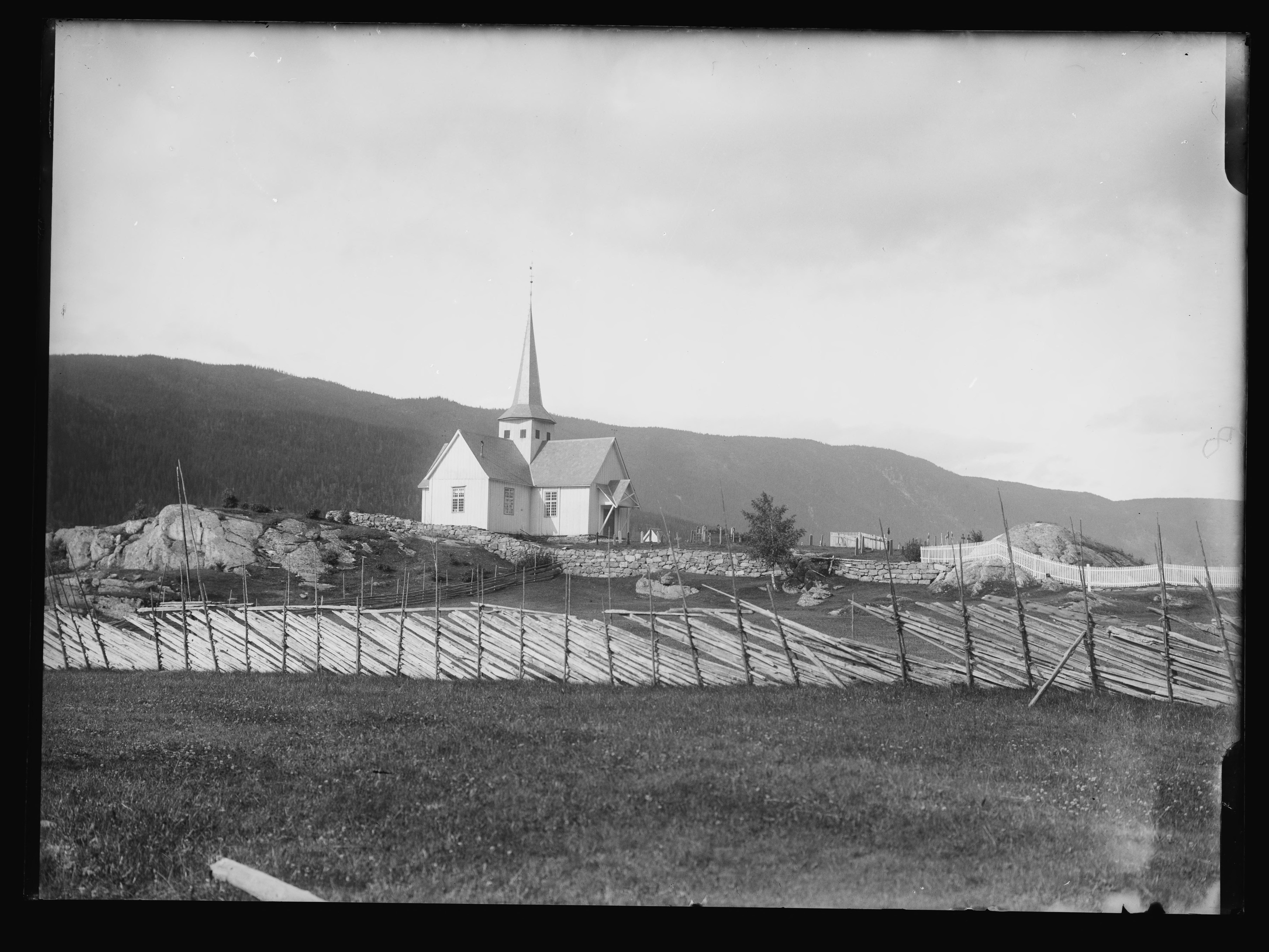

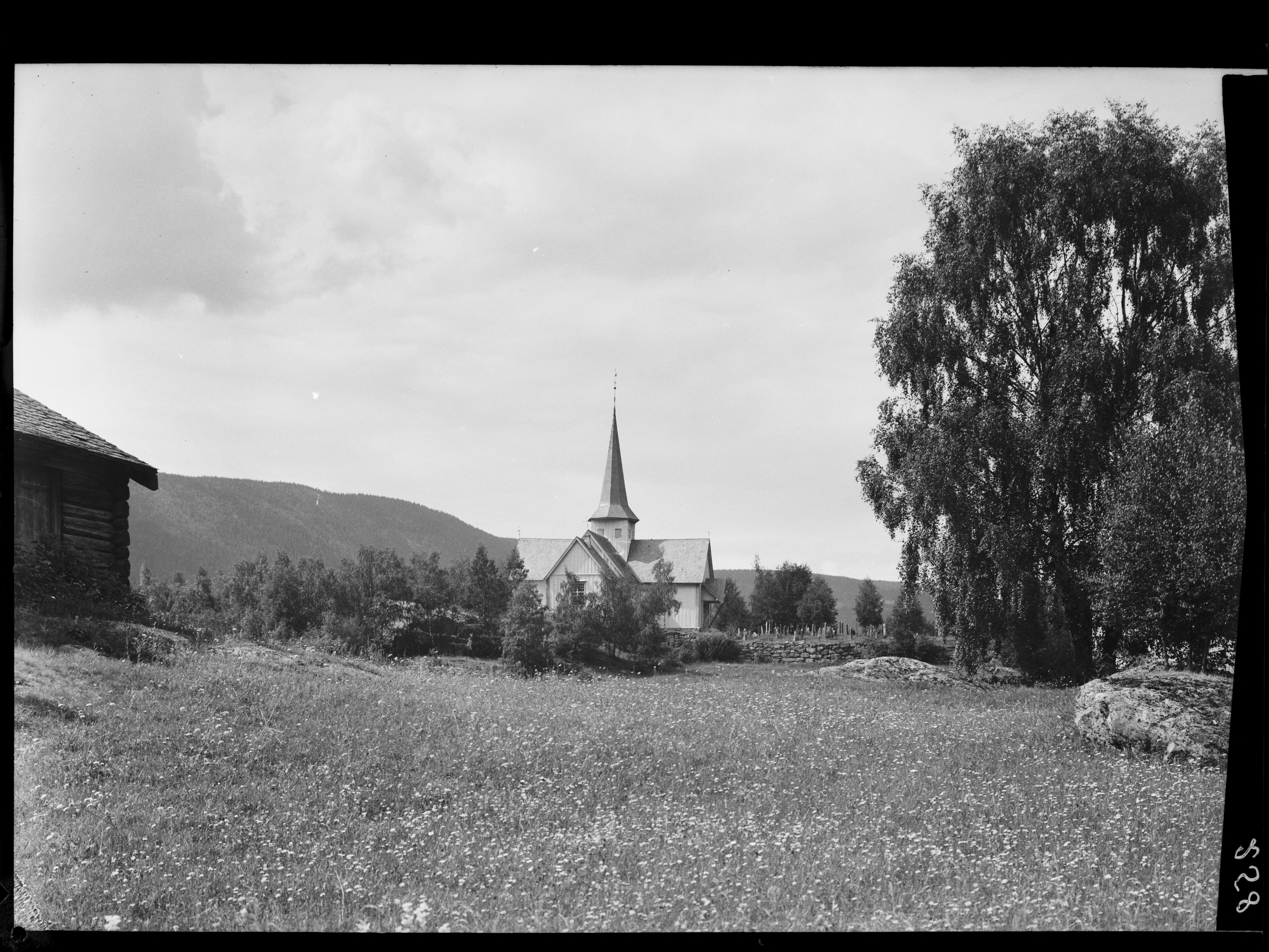

== See also ==
- List of churches in Hamar
