= Skrautvål Church =

Church in Innlandet, Norway

- Skrautvål kyrkje
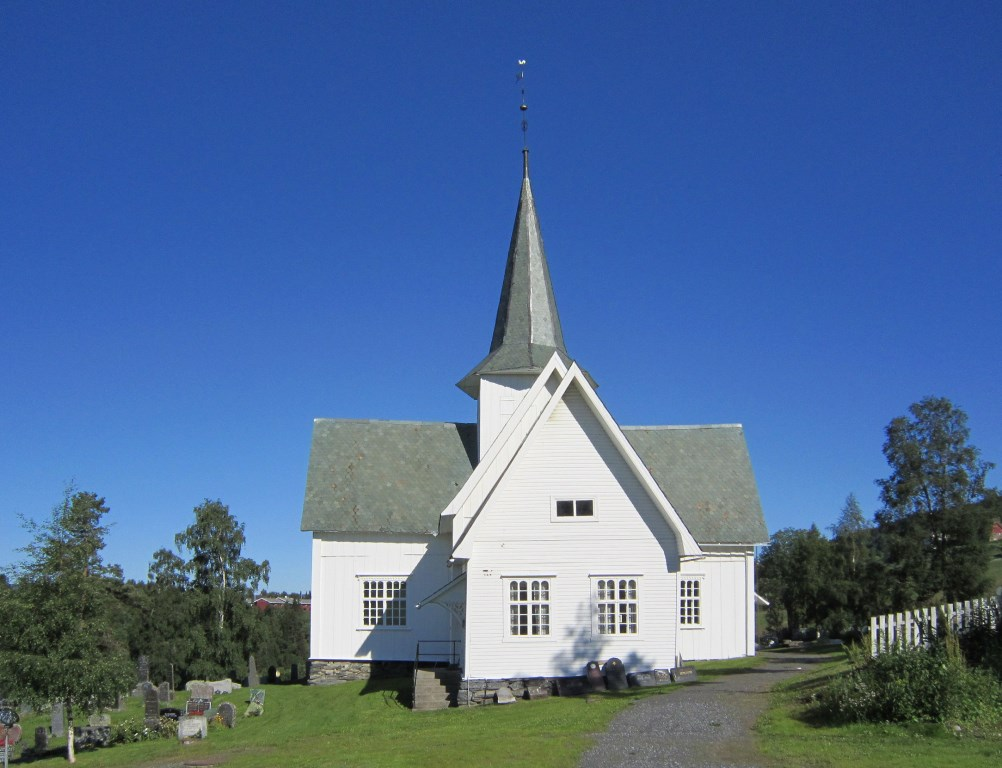
- View of the church
- Skrautvål Church
- 61°01′48″N 9°12′45″E
- Location: Nord-Aurdal, Innlandet
- Country: Norway
- Denomination: Church of Norway
- Previous denomination: Catholic Church
- Churchmanship: Evangelical Lutheran

History
- Status: Parish church
- Founded: 13th century
- Consecrated: 1785

Architecture
- Functional status: Active
- Architect: Svend Tråseth
- Architectural type: Cruciform
- Completed: 1785 (241 years ago)

Specifications
- Capacity: 230
- Materials: Wood

Administration
- Diocese: Hamar bispedømme
- Deanery: Valdres prosti
- Parish: Skrautvål
- Norwegian Cultural Heritage Site
- Type: Church
- Status: Automatically protected
- ID: 85478

Skrautvål Church (Norwegian: Skrautvål kyrkje) is a parish church of the Church of Norway in Nord-Aurdal Municipality in Innlandet county, Norway. It is located in the village of Skrautvål. It is the church for the Skrautvål parish which is part of the Valdres prosti (deanery) in the Diocese of Hamar. The white, wooden church was built in a cruciform design in 1785 using plans drawn up by the architect Svend Tråseth. The church seats about 230 people.

== History ==
The earliest existing historical records of the church date back to the year 1311, but the church was not built that year. The first church in Skrautvål was a wooden stave church that was likely built during the late 13th century (probably around the year 1280). This church stood about 250 metres (820 ft) to the southwest of the present church site.

Plans for a new church were made during the 1780s. Svend Tråseth was hired to design and build a new church on a new site, about 250 metres (820 ft) to the northeast, just up the hill from the old church. The church was built and consecrated in 1785. The old church was torn down after the new church was completed. The new church was a wooden cruciform building. In 1861, a church porch was built on the west end of the church. In 1890, a new sacristy was built on the east end of the building. In 1907, the windows and a door were replaced.

== See also ==
- List of churches in Hamar
