= Kaare Strøm (limnologist) =

Norwegian limnologist

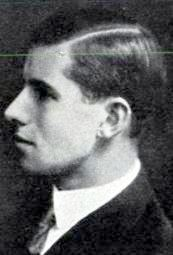
Kaare Strøm

Kaare Knutsson Münster Strøm (from 1949 only Kaare Strøm; 23 July 1902 – 28 February 1967) was a Norwegian limnologist.

He was born in Nord-Aurdal Municipality as a son of pharmacist Knut Thorstensen Strøm (1863–1938) and his wife Marianne Münster (1870–1943). He was a grandson of Christian Münster. He grew up in Kristiania, finished his secondary education at Frogner already in 1918, and began as a private student of Nordal Wille. He took the dr.philos. degree at the Royal Frederick University in 1927 on the thesis Norwegian Mountain Algae. He spent some time studying under August Thienemann, and was a research fellow at the university from 1931 to 1936. He was promoted to docent in 1939 and professor in 1948. At first he was a professor in physical geography and limnology, but from 1962 only in limnology. Strøm chaired the Norwegian Biological Society from 1934 to 1935, the Norwegian Geographical Association from 1944 to 1945 and the Norwegian Geographical Society from 1948 to 1949. He became a member of the Norwegian Academy of Science and Letters in 1943.

Strøm was married to banker's daughter Agathe Hvistendahl from 1929 to 1949, and then to Kari Thorsen from December 1949. He died in February 1967 in Århus, where he had a tenure as guest scholar.
