= Asbjørn Granheim =

Norwegian politician

Asbjørn Granheim (born 1 January 1906 in Nord-Aurdal Municipality, died 27 January 1977) was a Norwegian politician for the Centre Party.

He was elected to the Norwegian Parliament from Oppland in 1969, but and was not re-elected in 1973. He had previously served as a deputy representative during the terms 1954–1957, 1958–1961 and 1965–1969.

On the local level he was a member of the municipal council for Nord-Aurdal Municipality from 1931 to 1971, serving as deputy mayor in 1937–1941 and 1945 and mayor from 1945 to 1971. From 1945 to 1963 he was also a member of Oppland county council. He chaired the county party chapter from 1962 to 1970.

Outside politics he worked as a farmer.
