= Hovda =

Hovda is a surname. Notable people with the surname include:

- Eleanor Hovda (1940–2009), American composer and dancer
- Kåre Hovda (1944–1999), Norwegian biathlete
- Kjell Hovda (born 1945), Norwegian biathlete
- Per Hovda (1908–1997), Norwegian philologist
- Tor Øyvind Hovda (born 1989), Norwegian footballer
