= Valdres =

Coordinates: 60°55′N 9°10′E

- District
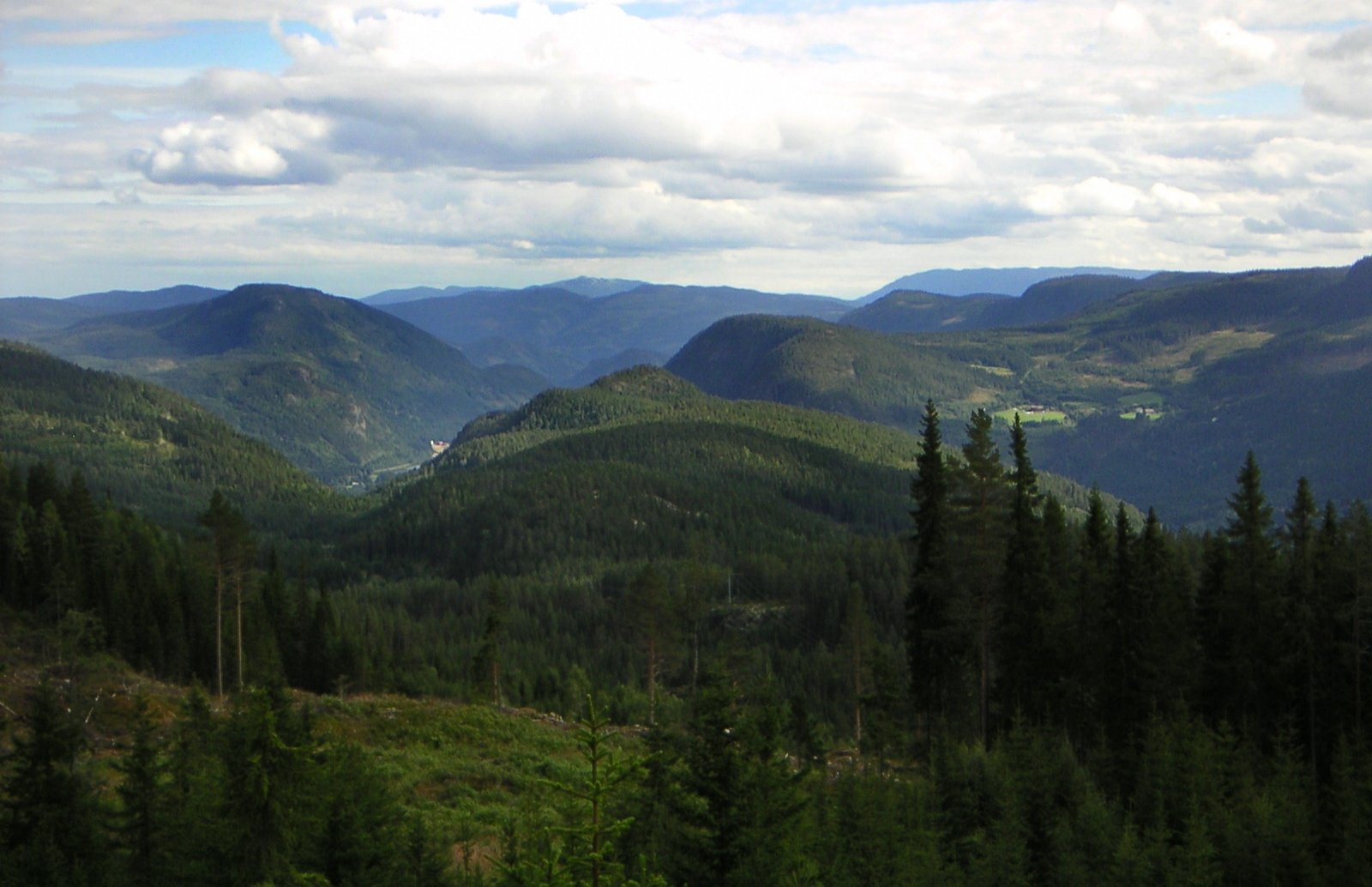
- View over Begnadalen from Lærskogen, with the large woodland ranging all over to Randsfjorden on the left and Hedalsfjella in the right background.

- Administrative map of municipalities in Valdres.
- Country: Norway
- County: Innlandet
- Region: Austlandet
- Urban Center: Fagernes

Area
  - Total: 5,406 km^{2} (2,087 sq mi)

Population (2010)
  - Total: 18,012
  - Density: 3.332/km^{2} (8.629/sq mi)
- Demonym: Valdris

Valdres (pronounced [ˈʋɑ̀ɫdrɛs]) is a traditional district in central, southern Norway, situated between the districts of Gudbrandsdalen and Hallingdal. The region of Valdres consists of the six municipalities of Nord-Aurdal, Sør-Aurdal, Øystre Slidre, Vestre Slidre, Vang, and Etnedal. Valdres has about 18,000 inhabitants and is known for its excellent trout fishing and the local dialect. Its main road is E16 and Fylkesveg 51.

Valdres is located approximately midway between Oslo and Bergen . The valley is protected to the west and north by the Jotunheimen mountains and the Valdresflye plateau and to the south by the Golsfjellet mountains in Gol Municipality. The main rivers are Begna and Etna. Historically, Valdres has had an agricultural economy, but tourism has grown in prominence in later years. Beitostølen, a highly developed tourist area for winter tourists and who have hosted FIS Cross-Country World Cup multiple times is located in Valdres.

== Etymology ==
The name of the district comes from the Old Norse stem words völlr (a mountainous plain) and dres (a cleaved road to be ridden on by a horse). Another explanation to the etymology is that Valdres stems from "Valdles", which is from the stem words vald (forest) and les (pasture), i.e. "the valley of pastures in the forest".

== Administration ==
Valdres is located in Innlandet county. It consists of the six municipalities of Nord-Aurdal, Sør-Aurdal, Øystre Slidre, Vestre Slidre, Vang, and Etnedal. The main town in the region is Fagernes, where there also is an airport. European route E16 is the main highway. Valdresbanen, the railroad connection from Oslo, was shut down in 1988 and the tracks are now removed.

== Valdres March ==
Valdresmarsjen
Played by the United States Marine Band

Valdres March (Norwegian: Valdresmarsjen) is the title of a Norwegian march composed by Johannes Hanssen in the years 1901-1904 and published by Boosey & Hawkes. The main theme is based on the signature fanfare for the Valdres Battalion, which is based on an old cow call. The following second variation includes a halling from Helgelandsmoen, a small village in Hole Municipality in Ringerike. The melody of the trio section was Hanssen's self composed Hardanger fiddle "slått", which is a pentatonic folk tune, above a drone bass line. When the piece was first performed in 1904, the composer played the baritone horn part together with the band of the 2nd Regiment of Norway.

== See also ==
- Hallingmål-Valdris
