= Fagernes =

Town in Innlandet, Norway

- Town/City
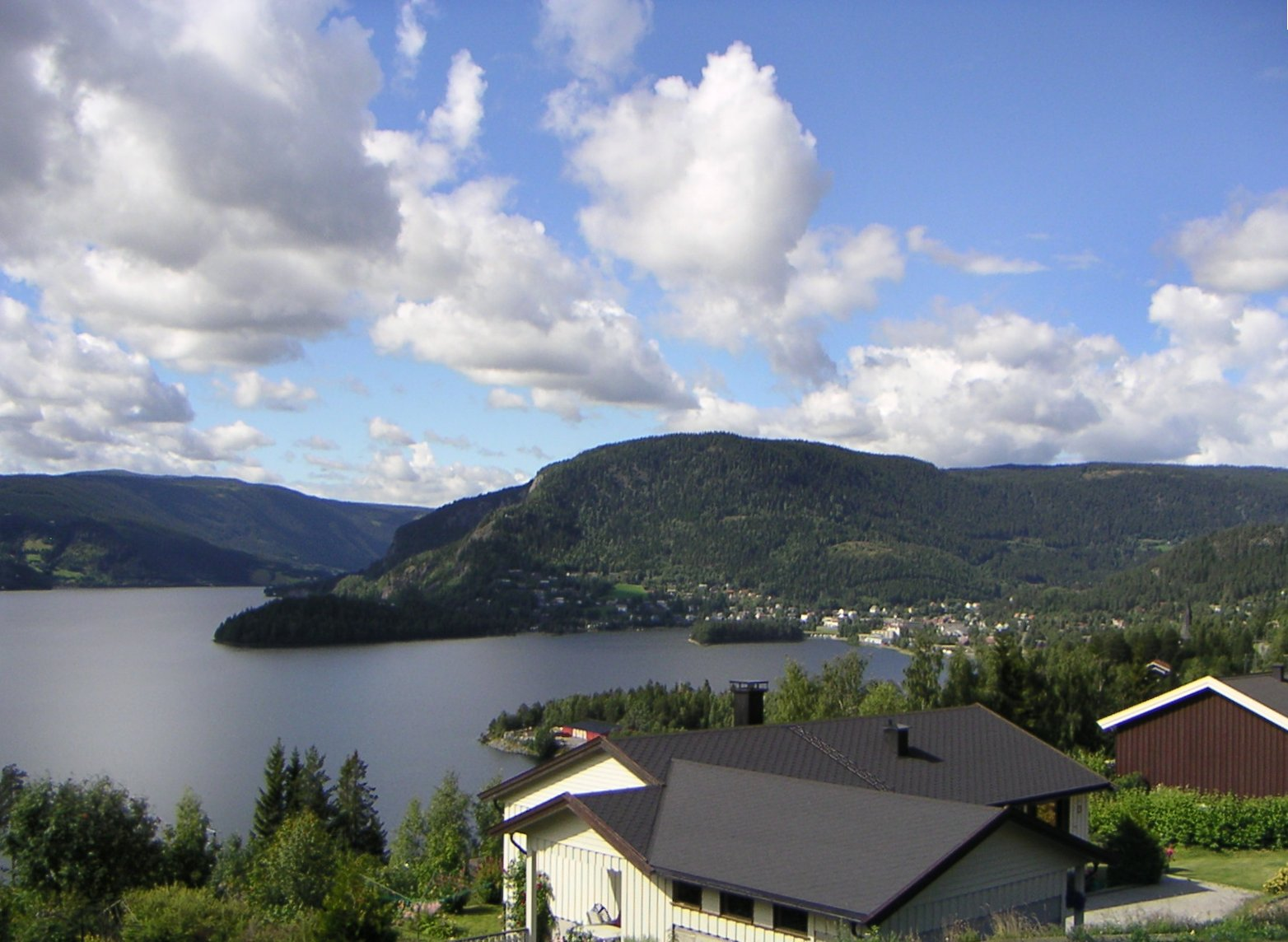
- View of the town
- Interactive map of Fagernes
- Location within Innlandet Location within Norway
- Coordinates: 60.98586°N 9.23227°E
- Country: Norway
- Region: Eastern Norway
- County: Innlandet
- District: Valdres
- Municipality: Nord-Aurdal Municipality
- Established as
- Town (By): 8 Sept 2007

Area
  - Total: 2 km^{2} (0.77 sq mi)
- Elevation: 360 m (1,180 ft)

Population (2024)
  - Total: 1,983
  - Density: 992/km^{2} (2,570/sq mi)
- Time zone: UTC+01:00 (CET)
  - Summer (DST): UTC+02:00 (CEST)
- Post Code: 2900 Fagernes

Fagernes is a town in Nord-Aurdal Municipality in Innlandet county, Norway. The town is the administrative centre of the municipality as well as the largest urban/commercial centre for the Valdres region. It is located just northwest of the village of Leira and about 5 kilometres (3.1 mi) south of the village of Skrautvål. The 2-square-kilometre (490-acre) town has a population (2024) of 1,983 and a population density of 992 inhabitants per square kilometre (2,570/sq mi).

Fagernes lies approximately 3 hours northwest of the capital city of Oslo, and is an important destination for tourism in Norway, due to good transportation connections and the nature in the surrounding Valdres valley, including the mountain areas such as Jotunheimen and Spåtind. The European route E16 highway runs through the town. The Strondafjorden lake lies on the south side of the town. Tingnes Church is located in the town. About 51 metres south of the Fagernes coastline facing the Strondafjorden, lays the Vesleøya, a small uninhabitated island connected by a small white wooden bridge.

== History ==
On 14 June 2007 the municipal council of Nord-Aurdal Municipality decided to bestow town status on the large village of Fagernes. The decision came into force on 8 September 2007, when Fagernes celebrated the 150th anniversary of its establishment as a village.

=== Name ===
Fagernes is a compound word made up of fager which means 'fair, beautiful' and nes which means 'headland'.

== Climate ==
Fagernes has a boreal climate (subarctic), close to a humid continental climate. February–April is the driest season, while summer is the wettest. The all-time low −36.4 °C (−33.5 °F) was recorded January 1987, and the all-time high 32.3 °C (90.1 °F) was recorded in both July 2014 and August 1982. The average date for first overnight freeze (below 0 °C (32 °F)) in autumn is 25 September (1981-2010 average).

Climate data for Fagernes in Nord-Aurdal, Valdres 1991-2020 (358 m, extremes 1982-2020)
Month	Jan	Feb	Mar	Apr	May	Jun	Jul	Aug	Sep	Oct	Nov	Dec	Year
Record high °C (°F)	11.6 (52.9)	12.2 (54.0)	15.2 (59.4)	21.5 (70.7)	27.5 (81.5)	31.3 (88.3)	32.3 (90.1)	32.3 (90.1)	26.3 (79.3)	21.7 (71.1)	14.9 (58.8)	11.3 (52.3)	32.3 (90.1)
Mean daily maximum °C (°F)	−3.9 (25.0)	−1.9 (28.6)	3.3 (37.9)	8.8 (47.8)	14.3 (57.7)	18.6 (65.5)	21.2 (70.2)	19.4 (66.9)	14.4 (57.9)	7 (45)	0.9 (33.6)	−3.3 (26.1)	8.2 (46.9)
Daily mean °C (°F)	−7.6 (18.3)	−6.7 (19.9)	−2.4 (27.7)	2.8 (37.0)	8.1 (46.6)	12.8 (55.0)	15.4 (59.7)	13.8 (56.8)	9.4 (48.9)	3.4 (38.1)	−1.8 (28.8)	−6.6 (20.1)	3.4 (38.1)
Mean daily minimum °C (°F)	−11.1 (12.0)	−10.4 (13.3)	−6.4 (20.5)	−1.3 (29.7)	3 (37)	7.8 (46.0)	10.7 (51.3)	9.7 (49.5)	6 (43)	1 (34)	−4.1 (24.6)	−9.6 (14.7)	−0.4 (31.3)
Record low °C (°F)	−36.4 (−33.5)	−34.4 (−29.9)	−29.5 (−21.1)	−18.2 (−0.8)	−4.9 (23.2)	−1.3 (29.7)	1.5 (34.7)	0 (32)	−4.4 (24.1)	−13.4 (7.9)	−23 (−9)	−27.7 (−17.9)	−36.4 (−33.5)
Average precipitation mm (inches)	44.6 (1.76)	26.9 (1.06)	25.1 (0.99)	27.2 (1.07)	55.7 (2.19)	67.2 (2.65)	87.1 (3.43)	88.6 (3.49)	54.6 (2.15)	52.1 (2.05)	53.8 (2.12)	39.9 (1.57)	622.8 (24.53)
Source 1: Norwegian Meteorological Institute
Source 2: NOAA-WMO averages 91-2020 Norway

== Notable people ==
- Erika Lundmoen, Norwegian-born Russian singer

== See also ==
- List of towns and cities in Norway
