= List of members of the Storting, 1862–1864 =

List of all the members of the Storting in the period 1862 to 1864. The list includes all those initially elected to the Storting as well as deputy representatives where available.

== Rural constituencies ==
=== Smaalenenes County ===
Name	Comments/Deputy
Carl Sibbern	
Haagen Ludvig Bergh	Deputy Tollef Olsen Lund stepped in after his death on 10 Mar 1863
Olai Pedersen Wiig	
Aimar August Sørenssen	

=== Akershus county ===
Name	Comments/Deputy
Ole Christensen Walstad	
Johan Sverdrup	
Jacob Hansen Hoelstad	
Harald Wedel-Jarlsberg	

=== Hedemarkens county ===
Name	Comments/Deputy
Torsten Pederesen Trøften	
Sivert Christensen Strøm	
Harald Heyerdahl	
Ole Bredesen	
Nils Jacobsen Hoel	

=== Christians county ===
Name	Comments/Deputy
Arne Hansen Baggerud	
Ole Brandt	
Michael Andreas Hammer Breien	
Christian Gundersen Fougner	
John Johnsen Harildstad	

=== Buskeruds county ===
Name	Comments/Deputy
Nils Nilsen Hilsen	
Morten Ludvig Sundt	
Hans Jacob Hofgaard	
Olaus Olsen Færden	

=== Jarlsberg and Laurvigs county ===
Name	Comments/Deputy
Nils Nilsen Enge	Deputy Christian Torber Hegge Geelmuyden stepped in after 16 March 1864.
Hans Jacob Olsen Aschjem	
Georg Prahl Harbitz	
Jakob Olsen Schjerven	Was ill in 1862 but returned in 1864. Deputy Jens Hovland Otterbech met during this time.

=== Bratsberg county ===
Name	Comments/Deputy
Hans Jørgen Christian Aall	
Frederik Charlow Sophus Borchsenius	
Aasmund Larsen Grave	
sSvenning Bjørnsen	

=== Nedenæs and Robygdelagets county ===
Name	Comments/Deputy
Halvor Torjussen Skjerkholt	
Ole Torjesen Lindstøl	
Jacob Svendsen	
Peter Rasmus Krag	

=== Lister and Mandals county ===
Name	Comments/Deputy
Hans Jacob Rolfsen	
Søren Pedersen Jaabæk	
Aanen Olsen Bergsager	
Sigbjørn Stenersen Helle	

=== Stavanger county ===
Name	Comments/Deputy
Ole Gabriel Gabrielsen Ueland	
Haakon Johannesen Storsteen	
Hans Andreas Ormsen Øverland	
Gabriel Olsen Ueland	
Ole Thorsen	

=== Søndre Bergenhuus County ===
Name	Comments/Deputy
Johannes Olsen Veseth	
Erik Arnesen Riisnæs	
Johannes Johannesen Aga	
Hans Jensen Krand	
Gotskalk Mathiassen Seim	

=== Nordre Bergenhuus County ===
Name	Comments/Deputy
Harald Ulrik Sverdrup	
Erik Martinussen Løken	
Hans Jensen Blom	
Thorsten Guttormsen Fretheim	
Sølfest Hansen Urdahl	

=== Romsdals County ===
Name	Comments/Deputy
Mauritz Andreas Rasmussen Aarflot	
Ludvig Daae	
Jørgen Olafsen	Deputy Rasmus Rasmussen Aarflot stepped in after Olafsen was discharged 14 Oct 1864 for illness.
Elias Arnesen Grønningsæther	
John Larsen Haaven	

=== Søndre Throndhjems County ===
Name	Comments/Deputy
Johan Richard Krandness	
Carl Edvard Aas	
Bernhard Ludvig Essendrop	
Diderik Iversen Tønseth	

=== Nordre Throndhjems County ===
Name	Comments/Deputy
Peder Strand Rygh	
Ole Jørgensen Richter	
Ole Sivert Mortensen Welde	
kPeter Andreas Sæther	

=== Nordlands County ===
Name	Comments/Deputy
Johan Augustinussen	
Eiler Hagerup Krand Prytz	
Marcus Morten Normann	
Frederik Nicolai Jensen	

=== Finmarkens County ===
Name	Comments/Deputy
Jens Holmboe	
Anders Vincent Stoltenberg	
Frederik Wilhelm Weidemann Norgreen	
Karl Gylche	

== Urban constituencies ==
=== Frederikshald ===
Name	Comments/Deputy
Even Saxlund	

=== Sarpsborg ===
Name	Comments/Deputy
Johan Lauritz Eitzen	

=== Frederiksstad ===
Name	Comments/Deputy
Ole Peter Larsen	

=== Moss and Drøbak ===
Name	Comments/Deputy
Frederik Julius Holst	

=== Christiania, Hønefoss and Kongsvinger ===
Name	Comments/Deputy
Ulrik Anton Motzfeldt	Never met due to illness. Deputy Peter Daniel Baade Wind Kildal stepped in.
Anton Martin Schweigaard	
Ole Jacob Broch	
Christian Birch-Reichenwald	

=== Gjøvik, Hamar and Lillehammer ===
Name	Comments/Deputy
Christian Jensen	

=== Drammen ===
Name	Comments/Deputy
Johan Jørgen Schwartz	
Frederik Messel Olsen	Christian Gjessing met after Olsen was discharged 18 Apr 1863 due to illness.

=== Kongsberg ===
Name	Comments/Deputy
Jens Landmark	

=== Holmestrand ===
Name	Comments/Deputy
Wilhelm Nielsen	

=== Tønsberg ===
Name	Comments/Deputy
Laurentius Føyn	

=== Laurvig and Sandefjord ===
Name	Comments/Deputy
Christian Christiansen	

=== Brevik ===
Name	Comments/Deputy
Henrik Carsten Albretsen	

=== Porsgrund ===
Name	Comments/Deputy
Niels Mathiesen	

=== Skien ===
Name	Comments/Deputy
Herman Bagger	

=== Kragerø ===
Name	Comments/Deputy
Thomes Thomesen	

=== Østerriisøer ===
Name	Comments/Deputy
Rolf Olsen	

=== Arendal and Grimstad ===
Name	Comments/Deputy
Henrik Laurentius Helliesen	Appointed Minister of State 22 Jun 1863, deputy Wilhelm Foss met in his stead.

=== Christianssand ===
Name	Comments/Deputy
Claus Christian Olrand	
Nils Vandt	

=== Flekkefjord ===
Name	Comments/Deputy
Nils Elias Børresen	Deputy Johan Andreas Kraft stepped in after he died 11 Apr 1863.

=== Stavanger ===
Name	Comments/Deputy
Halvor Olaus Christensen	
Henrik Andreas Zetlitz Lassen	

=== Bergen ===
Name	Comments/Deputy
Daniel Cornelius Danielssen	
Adolph Jørgen Prante	
Morten Andreas Rosendahl	
Hans Holmboe	

=== Aalesund and Molde ===
Name	Comments/Deputy
Hilmar Martinus Strøm	

=== Christianssund ===
Name	Comments/Deputy
Nicolai Henrik Knudtzon	

=== Throndhjem and Levanger ===
Name	Comments/Deputy
Einar Gram	
Johan Peter Bye	Deputy Hans Jenssen stepped in after his death 25 Sept 1863.
Hans Peter Jenssen	Deputy Emil Aubert met in his stead after he was discharged due to illness in 1864.
Ove Høegh	Deputy Fritz Lorck stepped in after his death 7 Feb 1863.

=== Hammerfest, Tromsø, Vadsø and Vardø ===
Name	Comments/Deputy
Johannes Wilhelm Christian Steen	

== Sources ==
- Lindstøl, Tallak (1914). Parliament and Council: 1814-1914. The individual parliament and councils 1814-1885 (in Norwegian). Kristiania: Steen'ske bandtrykkeri.
- Norwegian Social Science Data Service
