= Johan Richard Krogness =

Norwegian businessman and politician

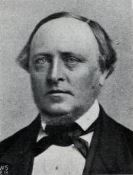
portrait of Johan Richard Krogness

Johan Richard Krogness (11 March 1814 – 3 February 1872) was a Norwegian businessperson and politician.

He was born in Trondhjem as a son of merchant Erik Rolfsen Krogness and Ingeborg Jensdatter. His half-sister Ingeborg Krogness was the mother of Erik Vullum.

Krogness took the examen artium in 1835 and went on to study law, but quit higher education before graduating. He returned to Trondhjem as a merchant from 1841 before settling at the manor Karlslyst in Hommelvigen, where he was a ship-owner and ran a brickworks.

Krogness served as mayor of Strinden Municipality. He was a deputy representative to the Parliament of Norway in 1851 and was elected in 1853, and was re-elected in 1856, 1859, 1862, 1865, 1868 and 1870, representing the rural constituency of Søndre Trondhjems Amt.

Krogness befriended Henrik Wergeland while he was a student, later Bjørnstjerne Bjørnson and was a close follower of Johan Sverdrup in parliamentary politics. As such, Krogness was one of the forerunners of the Liberal Party. He missed the 1871 session due to illness, and died in February the year after from "weakness of the chest". He was married to Danish woman Elisabeth Lucie Marie Biering.
