= Fritz Lorck =

Norwegian politician

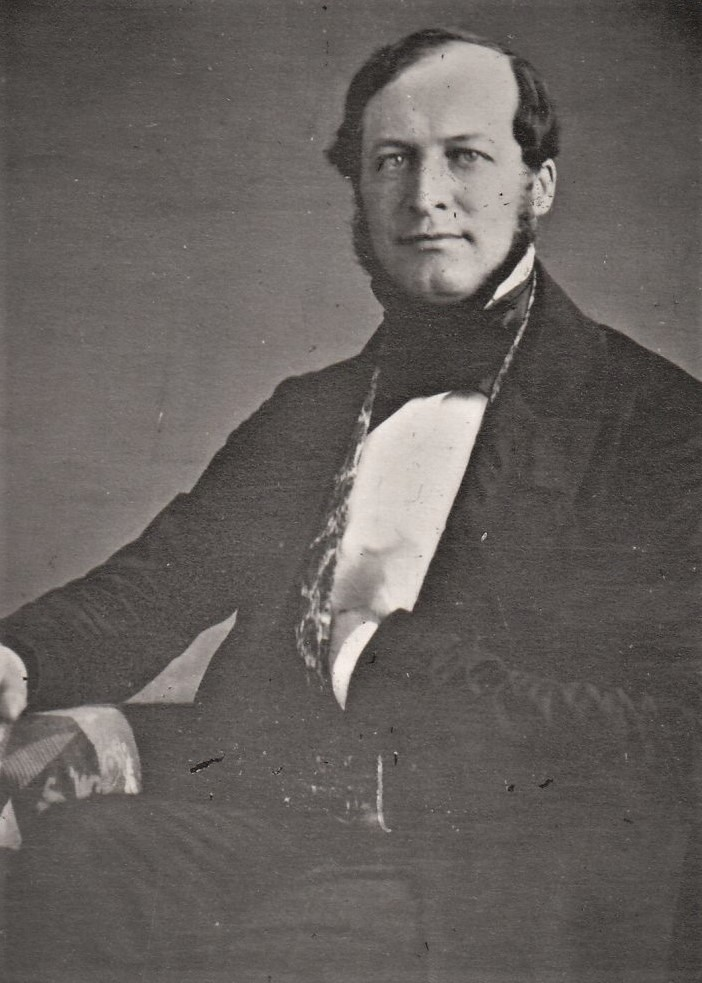
Image of Frederik Christian (Fritz) Lorck

Frederik Christian "Fritz" Lorck (2 July 1815 – 9 May 1901) was a Norwegian merchant and politician.

He was born in Trondhjem a son of wholesaler Lorentz Lorck and Nicoline Kathrine Fernandine, née Frølich. He finished his secondary education in Frederikshald in 1834.

He married Elisabeth Sofie Wiel, a member of the timber merchant family Wiel from Frederikshald. Their son Karl Fredrik Sophus Lorck became a member of Parliament, as did Fritz' father-in-law Mads Truelsen Wiel and brother-in-law Andreas Melchior Glückstad Wiel.

After working for Barloch & Wahl in Hamburg, Lorck moved back to Trondhjem where he was a merchant. He also became consul for Belgium, was the managing director of a savings bank and sat on the supervisory council and board of the Bank of Norway in Trondhjem from 1854 to 1884.

He was elected a deputy representative to the Parliament of Norway from Trondhjem og Levanger in 1856, 1859 and 1862. In February 1863, the full representative Ove Guldberg Høegh died and Lorck moved up in his place. Lorck was subsequently re-elected in 1865, 1868, 1870 (but rescinded the seat), 1873, 1876 and 1882. He left politics in 1885.

With 29 years in Trondhjem city council, Lorck served as mayor of Trondhjem in 1863, 1864, 1867, 1868 and 1870.

He was decorated as a Knight of the Swedish Order of the Polar Star.

Political offices
Preceded by Ove Guldberg Høegh	Mayor of Trondheim; 1863–1864	Succeeded by Aage Schavland
Preceded by Ove Christian Roll	Mayor of Trondheim; 1867–1868	Succeeded by Michael Getz
Preceded by Michael Getz	Mayor of Trondheim; 1870	Succeeded by Carl Arnoldus Müller
