= Nils Hilsen =

Norwegian politician

Nils Nilsen Hilsen (20 May 1794 – 25 July 1872) was a Norwegian teacher and politician.

He hailed from Snarum in Modum, but worked as a sexton and teacher in Lier. Among others he served as mayor and director of the loval savings bank. He was a brother of fellow politician Hans Nilsen Gubberud.

He was elected to the Parliament of Norway in 1847. He then had a one-term hiatus before being steadily re-elected in 1853, 1856, 1859, and 1862. He represented the constituency of Buskeruds Amt.
