= Færden =

Færden is a Norwegian surname. Notable people with the surname include:

- Michael Færden (1836–1912), Norwegian priest and author
- Olaus Færden (1826–1913), Norwegian farmer and politician
- Else Færden (born 1952), Norwegian children's writer
- Wilhelm Hansen Færden (1852–1923), Norwegian military officer and politician
