= Stabell =

Stabell is a surname. Notable people with the surname include:

- Adolf Bredo Stabell (1807–1865), Norwegian newspaper editor, banker and politician
- Adolf Bredo Stabell (diplomat) (1908–1996), Norwegian diplomat
- Alfred Stabell (1862–1942), Norwegian sport shooter
- Frederik Wilhelm Stabell (1763–1836), Norwegian military officer and politician
- Graham Stabell, Australian cyclist
- Harald Stabell (born 1947), Norwegian barrister
- Joe Stabell (died 1923), American baseball player
- Lars Bastian Ridder Stabell (1798–1860), Norwegian politician
- Peter Platou Stabell (1908–1992), Norwegian barrister
- Thea Stabell (born 1939), Norwegian actress
