= Albert Henrik Krohn Balchen =

Norwegian priest and politician (1825–1908)

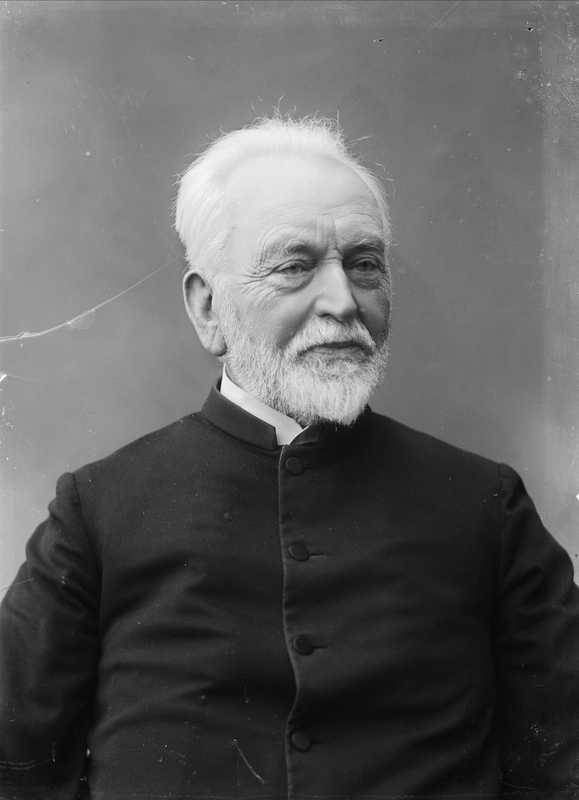
Balchen in 1905

Albert Henrik Krohn Balchen (8 October 1825 – 12 November 1908) was a Norwegian priest and politician for the Conservative Party.

He was a vicar in Sarpsborg when being elected to represent the city in the Parliament of Norway, in the elections of 1868, 1870 and 1873. Following a parliamentary hiatus, as dean of Larvik prosti, he was elected to represent the constituency of Larvik and Sandefjord in the 1885 and 1888 Norwegian parliamentary election.
