= Sibbern =

Sibbern is a Norwegian surname. Notable people with the surname include:

- Carl Sibbern (1809–1880), Norwegian politician
- Georg Sibbern (1816–1901), Norwegian politician
- Valentin Christian Wilhelm Sibbern (1779–1853), Norwegian government minister
