= Karl Gylche =

Norwegian politician

Karl Gylche (17 December 1820 – 21 December 1878) was a Norwegian bailiff and politician.

He was born in Trondhjem as a son of Johan Fredrik Gylche. Karl Gylche started his career as a clerk for the vogt of Ørlandet, then Tromsøe. Gylche then became bailiff of Trondenes in 1841 and Inderøen in 1842. From 1867 he was head controller of liquor and malt production in Central Norway, first continuing his residence in Inderøen but eventually moving to Stiklestad. He was married to Jacobine Rebekka Holst.

He was elected as a deputy representative to the Parliament of Norway from Finmarkens amt in 1850, 1853 and 1856. In the second half of 1857 and most of 1858, he was present in parliamentary session, filling in for Stephen Henry Thomas, who was on leave to manage a mining company in Chile. Karl Gylche was then elected as a member of Parliament in 1859 and 1862.

Gylche died at Stiklestad shortly after his 58th birthday. Trondhjems Adressecontoirs-Efterretninger gave the cause of death as pneumonia.
