= Ove Guldberg Høegh =

Norwegian politician

Ove Guldberg Høegh (23 April 1814 – 7 February 1863) was a Norwegian medical doctor and politician.

He was born in Grue as a son of Dines Guldberg Høegh and Pauline Lovise Juell. He was a half-brother of architect Ole Peter Riis Høegh. Høegh finished his secondary education in Skien in 1833 and graduated with the cand.med. degree in 1840. Both during and after his medical education he was a physician in Lofoten and Salten, continuing as a private physician in Lødingen Municipality from 1841 and Alta Municipality from 1843. In 1845 he became district physician on the island of Senja, residing in Trondenes Municipality.

Høegh was elected to the Parliament of Norway from Finmarkens amt in 1850 and 1853.

In 1854 he was appointed as chief physician of leprosy in Trondhjem. His area of responsibility was the entire mid- to northern part of Norway. In 1861, the institution Reitgjerdet was established in Trondhjem to combat the disease. Høegh also produced the statistics Beretninger om den spedalske Sygdom every year from 1855 through 1861. The press at the time also credited him with spreading basic hygiene to coastal Norway, making the people "reap the first rewards of civilization".

Høegh also served as mayor of Trondhjem in 1862. He desired to return to Parliament to pursue further advancements against the leprous disease. He then became a deputy representative from Trondhjem og Levanger in 1859 and lastly full representative again in 1862. Shortly after commencing his last term, he died at Rikshospitalet. Morgenbladet gave the cause of death as typhoid.

Høegh was married twice, first to Anne Sophie Schelderup and secondly to Ingeborg Anna Dons. During his second marriage, he was a son-in-law of politician Nicolai Normann Dons.

Political offices
Preceded by Einar Schavland Gram	Mayor of Trondheim; 1862	Succeeded by Fritz Lorck
