= Hans Nilsen Gubberud =

Norwegian politician

Hans Nilsen Gubberud (16 September 1782 – 21 April 1835) was a Norwegian farmer and politician.

He hailed from the farm Brekke in Modum, but changed his last name as he took over the farm Gubberud by marriage in 1811. He was a brother of Nils Hilsen.

He was elected to the Parliament of Norway in 1823, and was re-elected in 1826 to serve two terms for the constituency of Buskeruds Amt.
