= Hans Jensen =

Hans Jensen may refer to:

- Hans Jacob Arnold Jensen (1777–1853), Norwegian military officer and politician
- Hans G. Jensen (1856–1922), Norwegian trade unionist and politician
- Hans Johan Jensen (1882–?), Norwegian politician
- J. Hans D. Jensen (1907–1973), German nuclear physicist
- Hans Jensen (Norway) (1817–1888), Norwegian businessperson and politician
- Hans Arne Jensen, Danish botanist, agronomist and writer
