= Olaus Færden =

Norwegian politician

Olaus Færden (17 April 1826 – 18 March 1913) was a Norwegian farmer and politician.

He was born at Færden farm (Færden i Norderhov) at Haugsbygd in Buskerud, Norway. He was a son of farmer Ole A. Færden and Anne O. Lagesen. He was a first cousin of Michael Færden and uncle of Wilhelm Hansen Færden and Anders Færden. In October 1847 in Norderhov he married farmer's daughter Maren K. Hverven (1825–1911). They had no children.

He became a farmer himself, after graduating from Asker Teachers' Seminary in 1844. He owned Hverven farm from 1847. In 1854 he was elected as a member of Norderhov municipal council. He served as mayor 1856–1865, 1872-1875 and 1892–1893. He was elected to the Parliament of Norway in 1859. He was later re-elected in 1862, 1865, 1868 and 1873, representing the constituency of Buskeruds Amt. He was also a deputy representative in 1857, 1871–1873 and 1877–1879. He held numerous posts in public committees, was an elector and arbitrator, and local savings bank director. He was a proponent of the construction of the Randsfjord Line, but had a very conservative political outlook. He consistently voted against the introduction of annual parliamentary sessions, and the possibility of summoning government ministers to Parliament.
