= Gylche =

Gylche is a surname. Notable people with the surname include:

- Karl Gylche (1820–1878), Norwegian bailiff and politician
- Preben Gylche (1927–1945), Danish resistance member executed by the German occupying power
- Vilhelm Gylche (1888–1952), Danish track and field athlete
