= Kallum =

Coordinates: 59°25′N 10°40′E

Kallum is a residential area in the city of Moss, Østfold, Norway. Although located in the neighboring municipality to the south, Rygge, it is a part of the urban area Moss. The part of the Moss urban area that stretches into Rygge has a population of 7,257.
