= Georg Sibbern =

Norwegian politician

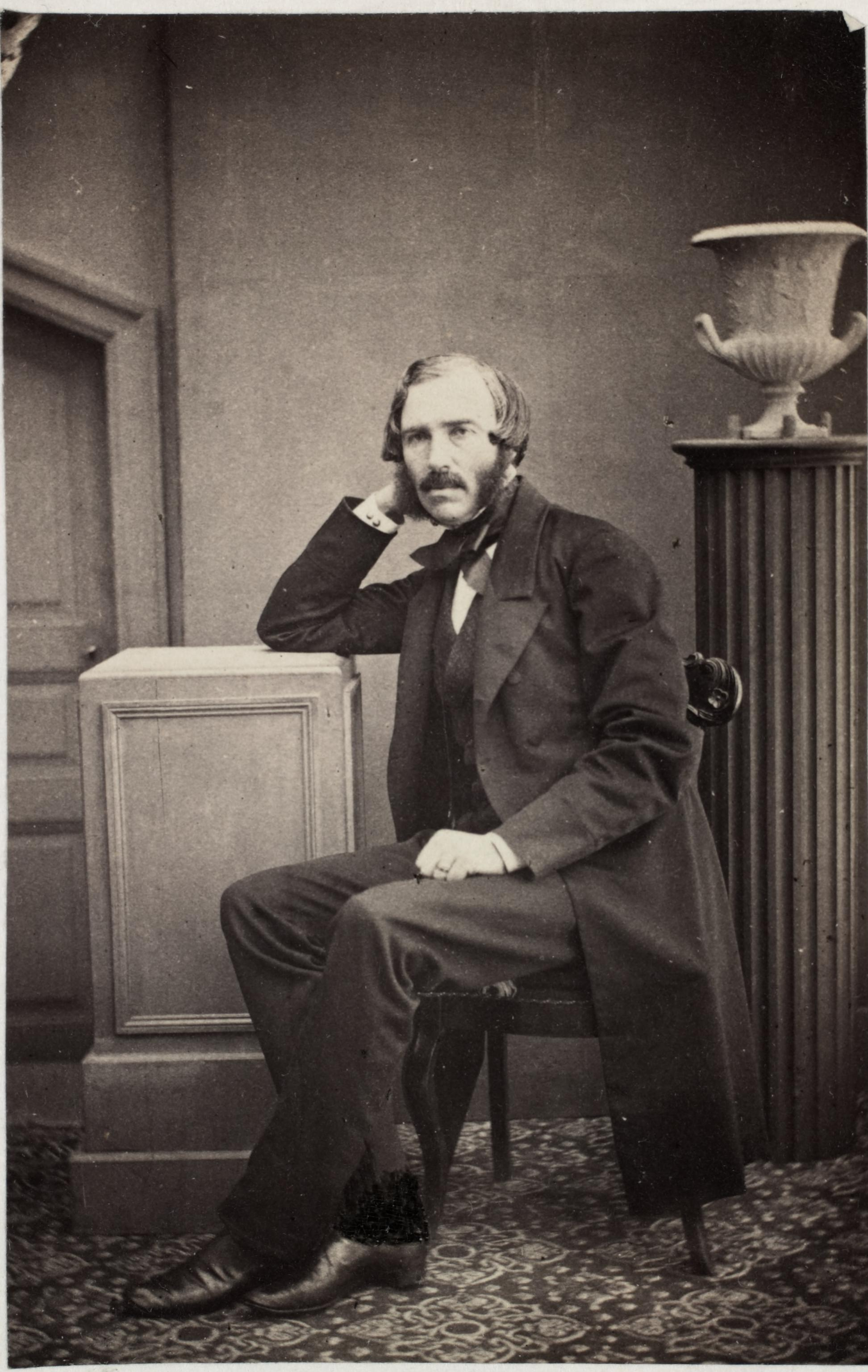
Georg Sibbern. Photo: Carl Jacob Malmberg

Georg Christian Sibbern (29 March 1816 – 4 October 1901) was a Norwegian diplomat who served as the Prime Minister of Norway.

== Background ==
He was born at Rygge in Østfold. He was the son of Valentin Sibbern (1779–1853) and Anne Cathrine de Stockfleth (1785–1865) and a brother of Alette Due and Carl Sibbern. His father was a Norwegian government minister and was a representative at the Norwegian Constitutional Assembly. He grow up at the family estate at Værne Kloster. He attended the Oslo Cathedral School. He completed his examen artium at Oslo Cathedral School in 1831, and graduated in law at the University of Christiania (now University of Oslo) in 1837.

== Career ==
From 1838 he worked as an agent by the Norwegian Minister Department in Stockholm and from 1840 was employed in the foreign service. He worked in Saint Petersburg (1842–1843), Copenhagen (1845-1847), The Hague (1847–1848), London (1848–1850) and Washington, D.C. (1850–1856). In April 1858, Sibbern was appointed Swedish-Norwegian envoy in Constantinople. He served as Norwegian Prime Minister from 16 December 1858 – 30 November 1861 and 17 December 1861 – 1 November 1871. He later was envoy in Paris (1878–1884).

== Personal life ==
On 20 November 1852, he married Maria Soane. He was the brother-in-law of Frederik Due.

Diplomatic posts
Preceded by Adam Christoffer Lövenskiöld	Chargé d'affaires of Sweden–Norway to the United States; 1850–1854	Succeeded by –
Preceded by –	Resident Minister of Sweden–Norway to the United States; 1854–1858	Succeeded by Wilhelm af Wetterstedt
Preceded by Anton Testa	Envoy of Sweden–Norway to the Ottoman Empire; 1858–1858	Succeeded by Peter Collett
Preceded by Georg Nicolaus Adelswärd	Envoy of Sweden–Norway to France; 1878–1884	Succeeded by Carl Lewenhaupt
