= Alette Due =

Norwegian singer, composer and courtier

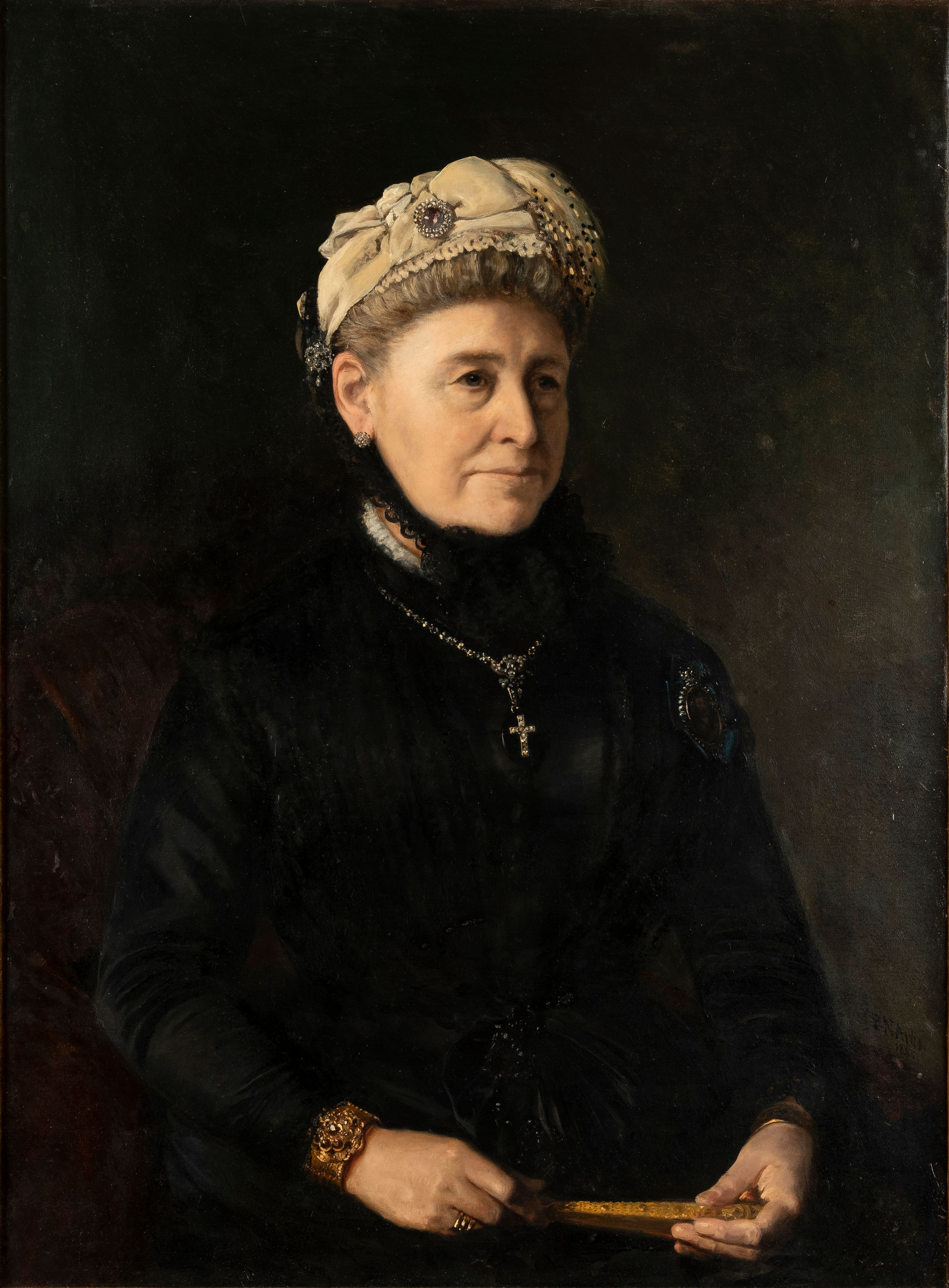
Portrait of Alette Due, 1885, by Peter Nicolai Arbo

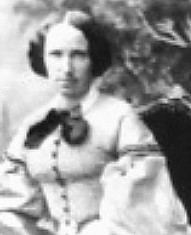
Alette Due in the 1860s.

Alethe "Alette" Wilhelmine Georgine Due, née Sibbern (28 February 1812 – 7 May 1887), was a Norwegian singer, composer and courtier. She was an honorary member of the Royal Swedish Academy of Music, and served as Overhoffmesterinne for Queen Sophia of Sweden and Norway in 1873–1887.

== Life ==
Alette Due was born in Værne Kloster, the daughter of councillor of state Valentin Christian Wilhelm Sibbern (1779–1853) and Anne Cathrine Stockfleth (1785–1865) and sister of prime minister Georg Sibbern and Carl Sibbern. In 1828 she married Frederik Due. She died in Oslo.

=== Musician ===
Her spouse was Norwegian state secretary stationed in Stockholm in 1822–1841, and Prime minister of Norway in 1841–1850. When her spouse was stationed in Stockholm, she became a central figure of the Swedish-Norwegian high society in the Swedish capital during the Union between Sweden and Norway.

Due was a non-professional musician of note: she performed as singer and composed songs as well as piano music. She was a member of the musical society Harmoniska Sällskapet ('Harmonic Society') in Stockholm, and was inducted as Honorary member to the Royal Swedish Academy of Music 30 December 1850.

=== Court career ===
In 1840, when she was living in Sweden where her spouse was posted in the Swedish capital, she was appointed statsfru (lady-in-waiting) to the Swedish royal court. In 1873, after the succession of king Oscar to the throne, she was appointed principal lady-in-waiting or Overhoffmesterinne for Queen Sophia of Sweden and Norway, an office she kept until her death. During the Union of Sweden and Norway, the royal family mainly stayed in Sweden, and the Norwegian court staff served during their visits in Norway: during the royal visit, the king and queen took leave of their Swedish entourage at the border and was met by their Norwegian Household, in whose company they remained until the passed the border back to Sweden again. The Norwegian court was however smaller: in 1874 her Swedish equivalent Elisabet Augusta Piper had three ladies-in-waiting under her while Alette Due had but one.

== Works ==
Songs for piano

- L’Exilé (X. Marmier). Romancer med piano componerede og Hendes Kongelige Höghet Prindsesse Eugenie underdanigst tilegnede. Songs for piano. Dedicated to Princess Eugénie.
- Till den frånvarande, i: Förgät mig ej! Album för sång vid piano, vol. 1, Stockholm: Svanberg, 1855., Song for Piano, printed in Stockholm 1855
- Tre sånger: 1. O, klarögda källa, 2. Dväljen er, suckar svalkande vinden!, 3. Beskows dröm (”Jag drömde du en blomma var”). Three Songs. Dedicated to Princess Eugénie.

Piano music

- La Rose et le Réséda, deux valses composées pour le pianoforte, valser.

Court offices
Preceded by Juliane Wedel Jarlsberg	Overhoffmesterinne to the Queen of Norway; 1873–1887	Succeeded by Elise Løvenskiold
