= 1826 Norwegian parliamentary election =

← 1823	June–1 December 1826	1829 →

All 79 seats in the Storting 40 seats needed for a majority
- Registered: 62,899
Prime Minister before election
Mathias Sommerhielm
Prime Minister after election
Mathias Sommerhielm

Parliamentary elections were held in Norway in 1826. As political parties were not officially established until 1884, all those elected were independents.

== Results ==
Of the 79 seats, 39 were won by civil servants, 20 by farmers, sheriffs, church singers and teachers and 20 by people with other professions.

Party	Votes	%	Seats
Independents			79
Total			79
Registered voters/turnout	62,899	–	
Source: Nohlen & Stöver, NSSDS
