= List of elections in 1823 =

The following elections occurred in the year 1823.

- 1823 Norwegian parliamentary election
- 1823 conclave

== See also ==
- Category:1823 elections
