= 1879 Norwegian parliamentary election =

- July–December 1879

All 114 seats in the Storting 58 seats needed for a majority
- Registered: 87,173
- Turnout: 48.67%
Prime Minister before election
Frederik Gottschalck Haxthausen Due
Prime Minister after election
Frederik Gottschalck Haxthausen Due

Parliamentary elections were held in Norway in 1879. The elections were not held on a specific date, as the various cities and Amts held the election at their own choice. Instead, the elections stretched from June to several months later. Voting rights were highly limited, as women were not allowed to vote and there were strong restrictions on men's ability to vote. It has been estimated that only 2.5% of the population of Christiania (Oslo), and 4.6% of the national population, was eligible to vote. The national election turnout was 48.7% (85% in Christiania), and 114 representatives were elected for the Norwegian Parliament, an increase of three seats compared to the Storting elected in 1876.

While there were no official parties, two informal groups existed, namely Venstre (meaning Left), or "the Liberals" (de liberale), and Høire. The latter list was called Aftenpostens og Morgenbladets liste in Christiania. The Venstre opposition, led by Johan Sverdrup, gained popularity particularly in the districts, while Høire remained the most popular in the cities. In Christiania, the Aftenpostens og Morgenbladets liste won about 1,800 of the votes, while Venstre won about 600.

== Results ==
Of the 114 seats, 52 were won by farmers, sheriffs, church singers and teachers, 30 by civil servants and 29 by people with other professions.

Party	Votes	%	Seats
Independents			114
Total			114
Total votes	42,430	–	
Registered voters/turnout	87,173	48.67	
Source: Nohlen & Stöver, NSSDS
