= Nicolai Normann Dons =

Norwegian politician

Nicolai Normann Dons (15 June, 1798 – 25 June, 1891) was a Norwegian merchant and politician.

He was born in Hamnvik, as a son of merchant Jens Bing Dons (1771–1823) and Ingeborg Anna née Normann.

Dons took over his father's merchant company. Among several positions in local politics and society, he managed a savings bank and served as mayor of Ibestad Municipality. He was elected a deputy representative to the Parliament of Norway from Finmarkens amt in 1841, and was elected as a representative in 1847 and 1850. He was decorated as a Knight, First Class of the Order of St. Olav.

He married Johanna Ovidia Frederikke Lund. His daughter, Ingeborg Anna Dons, married Ove Guldberg Høegh.
