= Møvik, Østfold =

Møvik
- Village
- Interactive map of Møvik
- Coordinates: 59°19′58.3″N 10°42′51.513″E
- Country: Norway
- Municipality: Rygge

Møvik is a village in Rygge municipality, Norway. Its population is 252.
