= 1876 Norwegian parliamentary election =

← 1873	June 1876–26 February 1877	1879 →

All 111 seats in the Storting 56 seats needed for a majority
- Registered: 84,253
- Turnout: 43.14%
Prime Minister before election
Frederik Gottschalck Haxthausen Due
Prime Minister after election
Frederik Gottschalck Haxthausen Due

Parliamentary elections were held in Norway in 1876. As political parties were not officially established until 1884, all those elected were independents. Voter turnout was 41%, although only 5% of the country's population was eligible to vote.

== Results ==
Of the 111 seats, 50 were won by farmers, sheriffs, church singers and teachers, 32 by civil servants and 29 by people with other professions.

Party	Votes	%	Seats
Independents			111
Total			111
Total votes	36,344	–	
Registered voters/turnout	84,253	43.14	
Source: Nohlen & Stöver, NSSDS
