= Erik Vullum =

Norwegian journalist, writer and politician

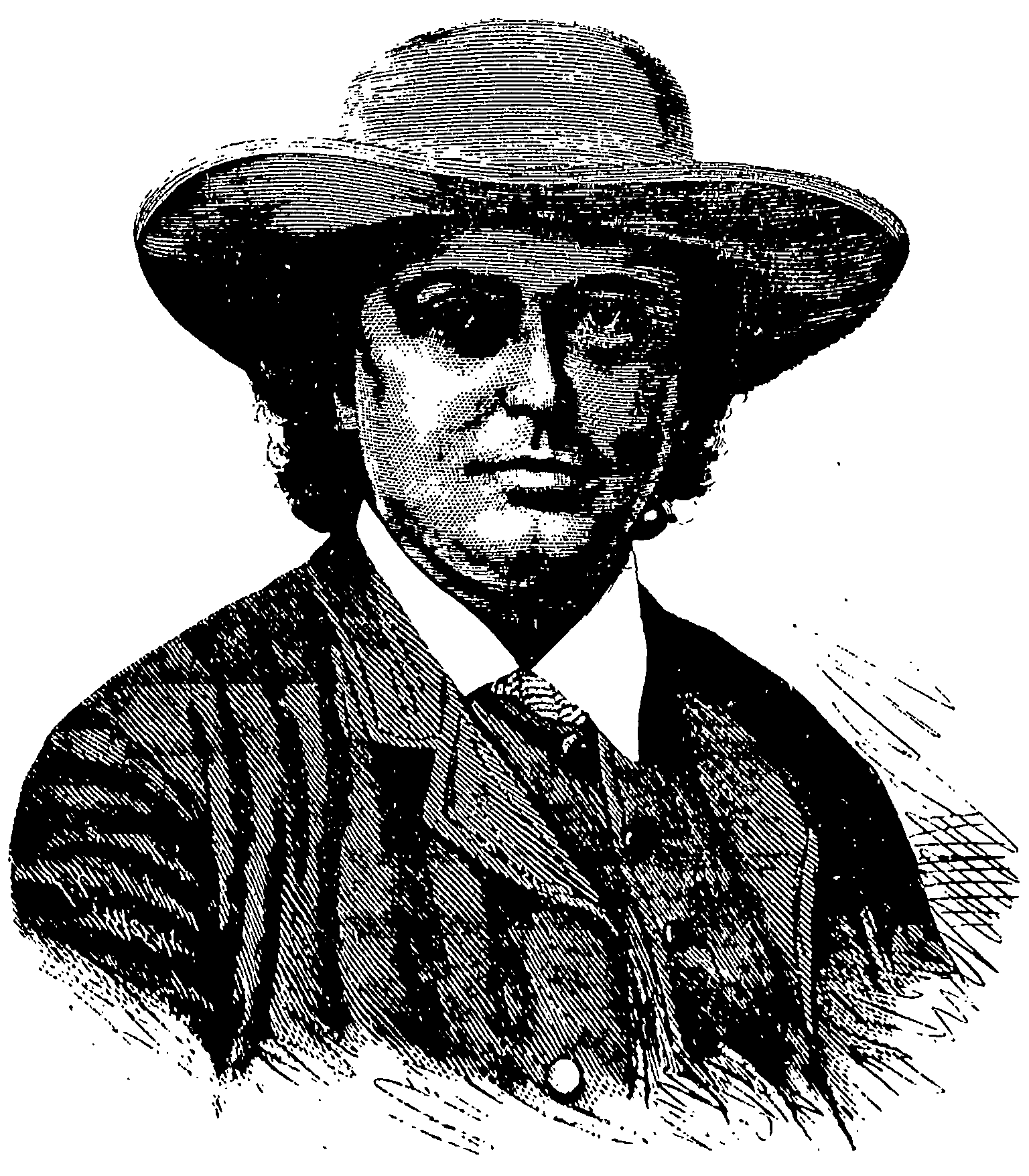
Erik Vullum.

Erik Vullum (29 December 1850 – 14 March 1916) was a Norwegian journalist, writer and politician for the Liberal Party.

== Personal life ==
He was born in Lund Municipality as a son of vicar Olaus Vullum (1812–1852) and his wife Ingeborg Krogness (1825–1926). He was a nephew of Johan Richard Krogness. In September 1879 at Aulestad he married Margrethe Rode, née Lehmann.

== Career ==
He was a prominent public speaker for the Liberal Party in the 1880s, and wrote several newspaper articles and books in the spirit of the liberal movement. He biographed Christian Magnus Falsen and Henrik Wergeland in 1881. Vullum portrayed Wergeland as a liberal political figure, not following the politically conservative tradition that branded Wergelenad as an apolitical wordsmith. Vullum also wrote several historical books tied to Norway's gradual independence: Følgerne af 9. Juni (1883), Unionen og dens Fremtid (1894) and Hvorledes Norge blev frit (1913).

Vullum died in March 1916 in Lillehammer.

== Bibliography ==
- Kristrian Magnus Falsen, Grundlovens Fader (1881)
- Henrik Wergeland i Digt og Liv (1881)
- Leon Gambetta (1881)
- Fölgerne af 9 Juni (1883)
- Unionen og dens Fremtid (1894)
- Hvorledes Norge bleu Frit (1913)
- Norge og Begivenhederne i 1814 (1914)
