= Wilhelm Hansen Færden =

Norwegian military officer and politician (1852–1923)

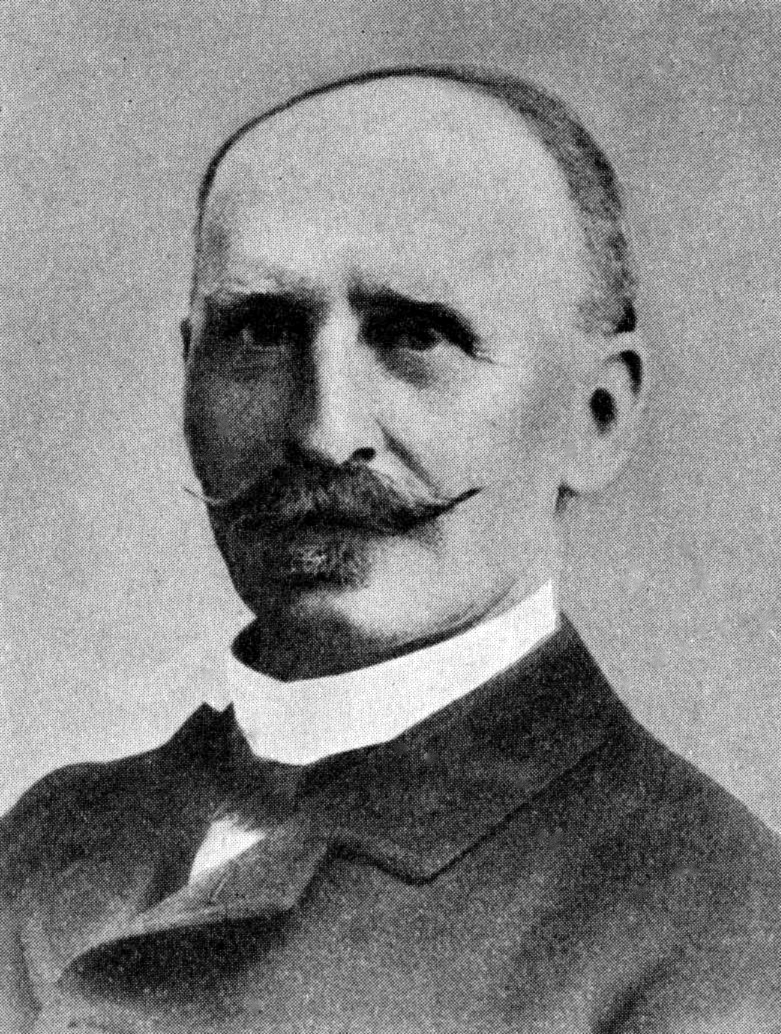
Wilhelm Hansen Færden

Wilhelm Hansen Færden (2 December 1852 – 14 October 1923) was a Norwegian military officer and politician.

He was born in Christiania as a son of captain Anders Olsen Færden and Sofie Marthine Hansen. He was a nephew of Olaus Færden, brother of Anders Færden and first cousin once removed of Michael Færden. In October 1877 in Berg, Østfold he married Ragna D. Sørensen (1854–1916).

He attended school in Ringerike, then Nissen's School in Christiania. He attended the Norwegian Military Academy from 1868 to 1872, and also graduated from the Norwegian Military College in 1875. He studied chemistry at the Royal Frederick University from 1880 to 1883. He reached the ranks of captain in January 1889, lieutenant colonel in April 1900 and colonel in January 1911. He was the director of Statens Krudtverk at Skar from 1889 to 1897, leader of the 1st Line Battery from 1897 to 1911, leader of the 1st Field Artillery Regiment from 1911 to December 1917; and also manager of the field artillery shooting school from 1913 to 1917.

Skar is in Maridalen, which was located in Aker at the time (now in Oslo). Færden was a member of Aker school board from 1893 to 1901, arbitrator (Norwegian: forlikskommissær) from 1901 to 1903, and municipal council member from 1895. He served as mayor from 1897 to 1901. He was a deputy member of the Parliament of Norway from 1895 to 1897 and a board member in Statens metalcentral from 1918 to 1920. When he died in Kristiania in October 1923, he was the Grand Master of the Norwegian Order of Freemasons.

Political offices
Preceded by Herman Wedel Jarlsberg	Mayor of Aker; 1897–1901	Succeeded by Peter Andreas Morell
