= Værne Kloster =

Old manor in Rygge, Moss, Norway

Coordinates: 59.3931°N 10.6725°E

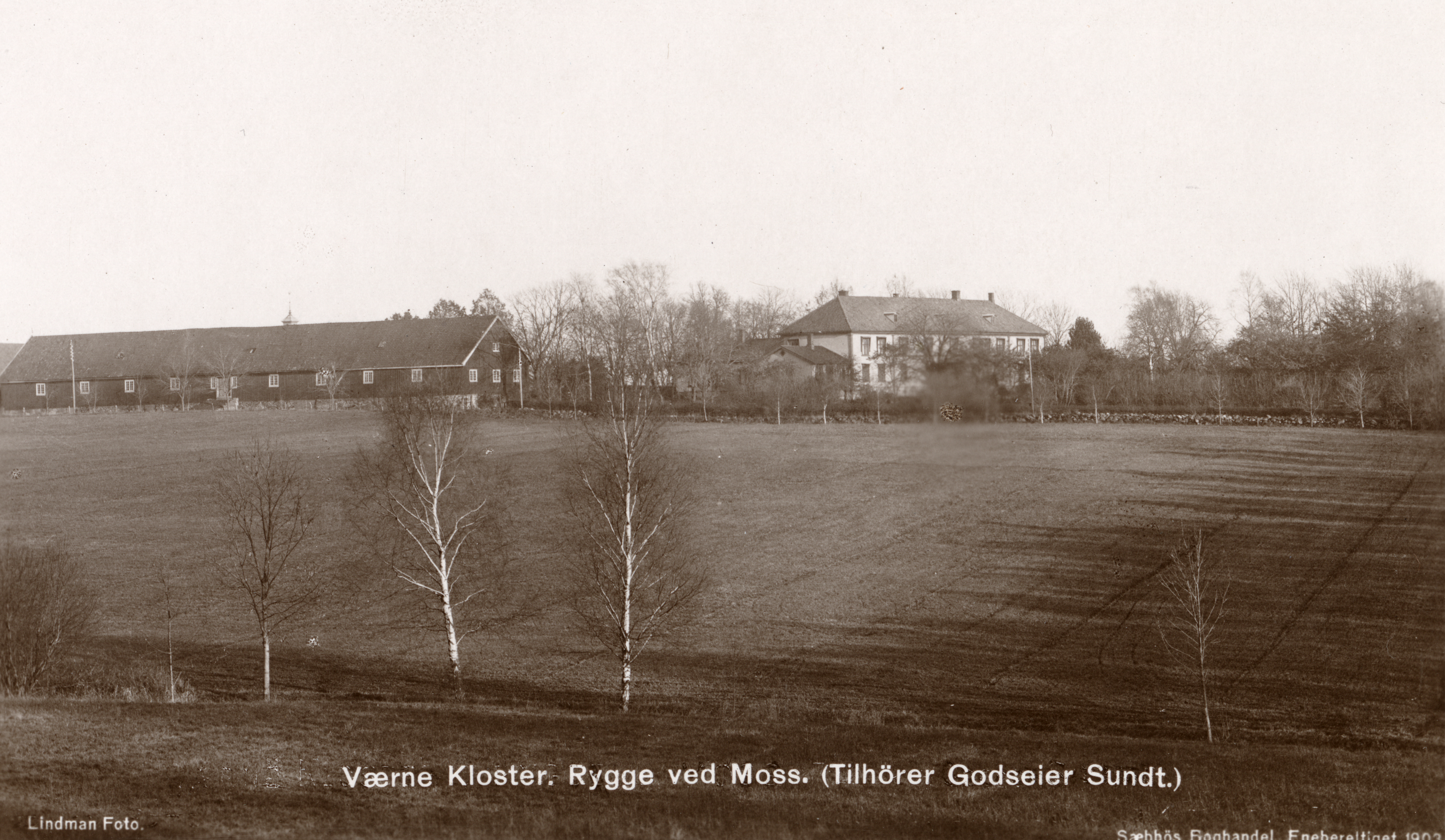
Værne Kloster

Værne Kloster is a manor and former abbey in the municipality of Rygge in Østfold, Norway. Today only ruins of the monastery remain.

Originally a Kongsgård estate, King Sverre of Norway established a Knights Hospitaller abbey at Værne around 1200. The facility also served as hospital for the king's army until 1308, when King Haakon V established a hospital for this purpose at St Mary's Church, Oslo. Værne monastery was also a place of pilgrimage. The abbey was disestablished and placed under the crown in 1532. The buildings were burned down in 1570 in connection with the Northern Seven Years' War. The manor with adjacent farms was leased until 1675, when it was privatized. Later owners of Værne Kloster included Valentin Christian Wilhelm Sibbern, Georg Sibbern. The first antiquarian study of the ruins was made in 1812 by Lorentz Diderich Kluwer (1750- 1820).
