= Peter Platou Stabell =

Norwegian barrister (1908–1992)

Peter Platou Stabell (12 August 1908 – 10 March 1992) was a Norwegian barrister.

He was born in Kolbu as a son of attorney Bernhard Dunker Stabell (1878–1929) and Dorothea Antoinette Platou (1883–1964). In 1948 he married American citizen Dorothy Nicholson. Stabell was a brother of diplomat Adolf Bredo Stabell, a distant descendant of the newspaper editor Adolf Bredo Stabell and uncle of actor Thea Stabell.

He took the examen artium in 1927 and graduated from the Royal Frederick University with the cand.jur. degree in 1932, together with his brother. He was an attorney in Gjøvik for one year before being deputy judge in Toten District Court from 1934. After studying at the London School of Economics in 1937, he was hired as a secretary in the employers' association Jordbrukets og Meierienes Arbeidsgiverforening. In 1940, following the occupation of Norway by Nazi Germany he was hired as a secretary in the Norwegian Ministry of Justice-in-exile in London. He was promoted to assistant secretary, but returned home after the Second World War to work as an attorney in Oslo from 1945 to 1949.

In 1949 he became a barrister with the access to work with Supreme Court cases. He was a partner in a law firm together with Herman Christiansen and Wilhelm Bugge. From 1965 he was a partner with Otto Chr. Ottesen, adding Niels M. Heiberg to the team in 1971. By his death at the age 84, the law firm was named Stabell Tellmann Strøm.

Stabell chaired Odda Smelteverk and Skaland Grafitverk from 1952, was a supervisory council member of Andresens Bank from 1959, and a board member of Automagnet/Robert Bosch Norge from 1948, Tyssefaldene from 1952, the Norwegian Branch of the International Law Association from 1952, Norsk Christiani & Nielsen from 1957, Kolberg Caspary from 1960 to 1970, Harald A. Møller from 1961, Norsk Marconikompani from 1963 and Borden Kjemi from 1966.

He died in March 1992 and was buried at Vestre gravlund.
