= Kirkegrenda =

Village in Moss Municipality, Norway

Coordinates: 59.3772°N 10.7297°E

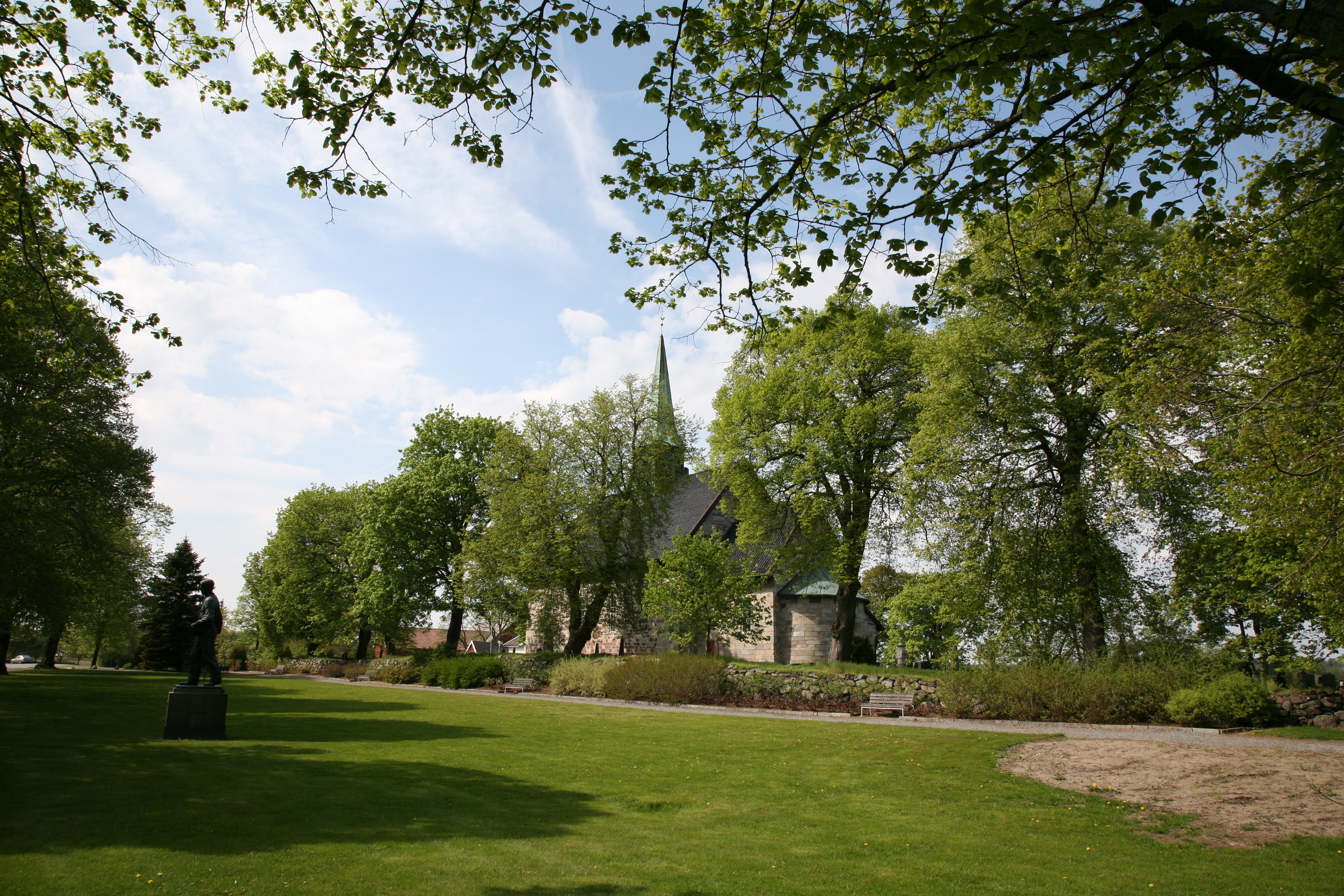
Kirkegrenda

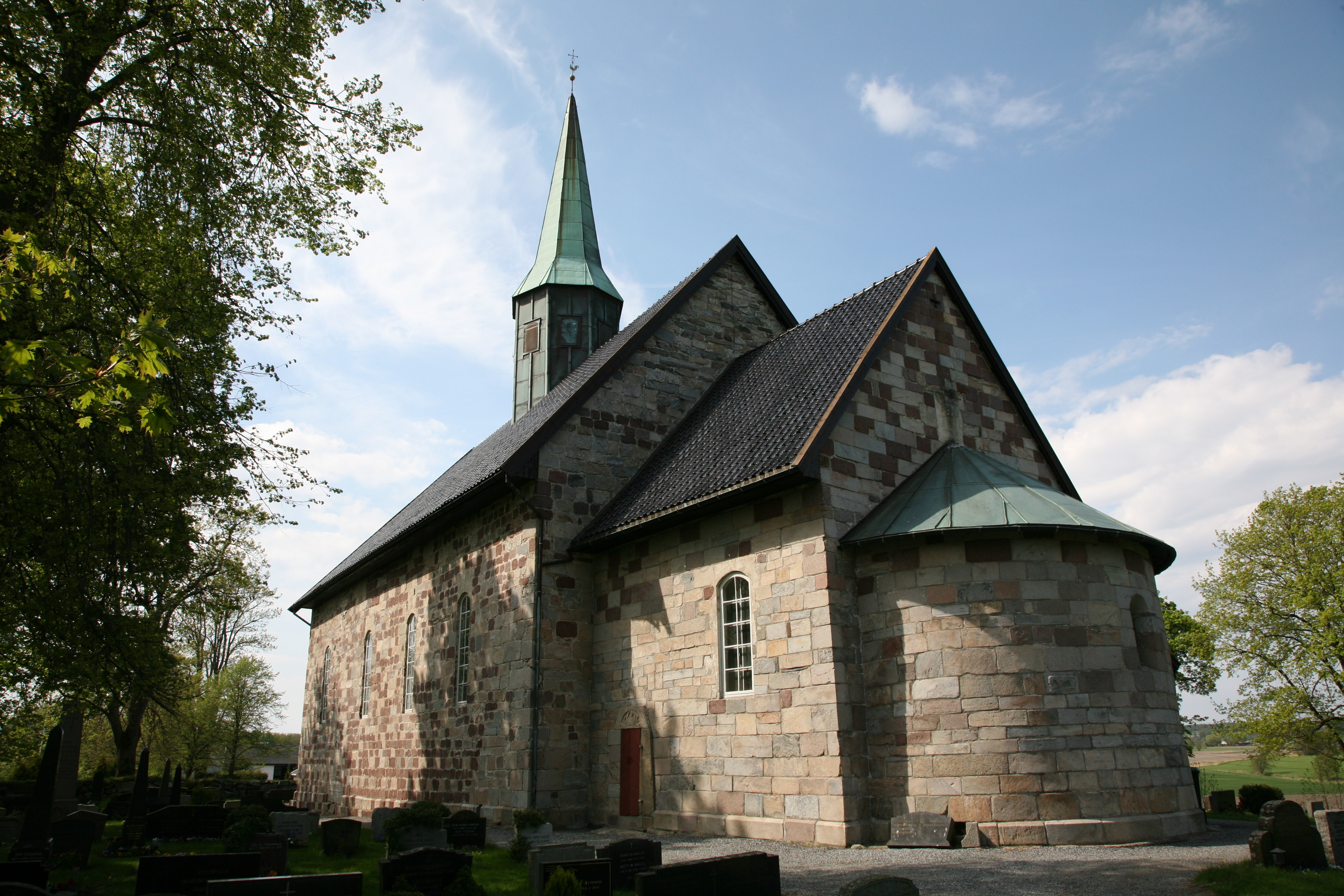
Rygge Church

Kirkegrenda is a village in the municipality of Rygge in Østfold, Norway. Its population (SSB 2005) is 294.

The village was built up around Rygge Church (Rygge kirke), hence the name Kirkegrenda which means church hamlet. Rygge church is a medieval era church. The church belongs to Vestre Borgesyssel deanery in Diocese of Borg. Rygge church is one of the county's better preserved medieval stone churches. The Romanesque church was built around the year 1170. Rygge church was originally a chapter church, which had income from a larger area than a parish and contained several villages. The building material is stone and brick. The building is characterized by the use of large stones, partly of granite, with parts of the facade carved, including large parts of the north portal. It has long nave and lower and narrower choir. The church was restored in 1967.

== Rygge Church Gallery ==
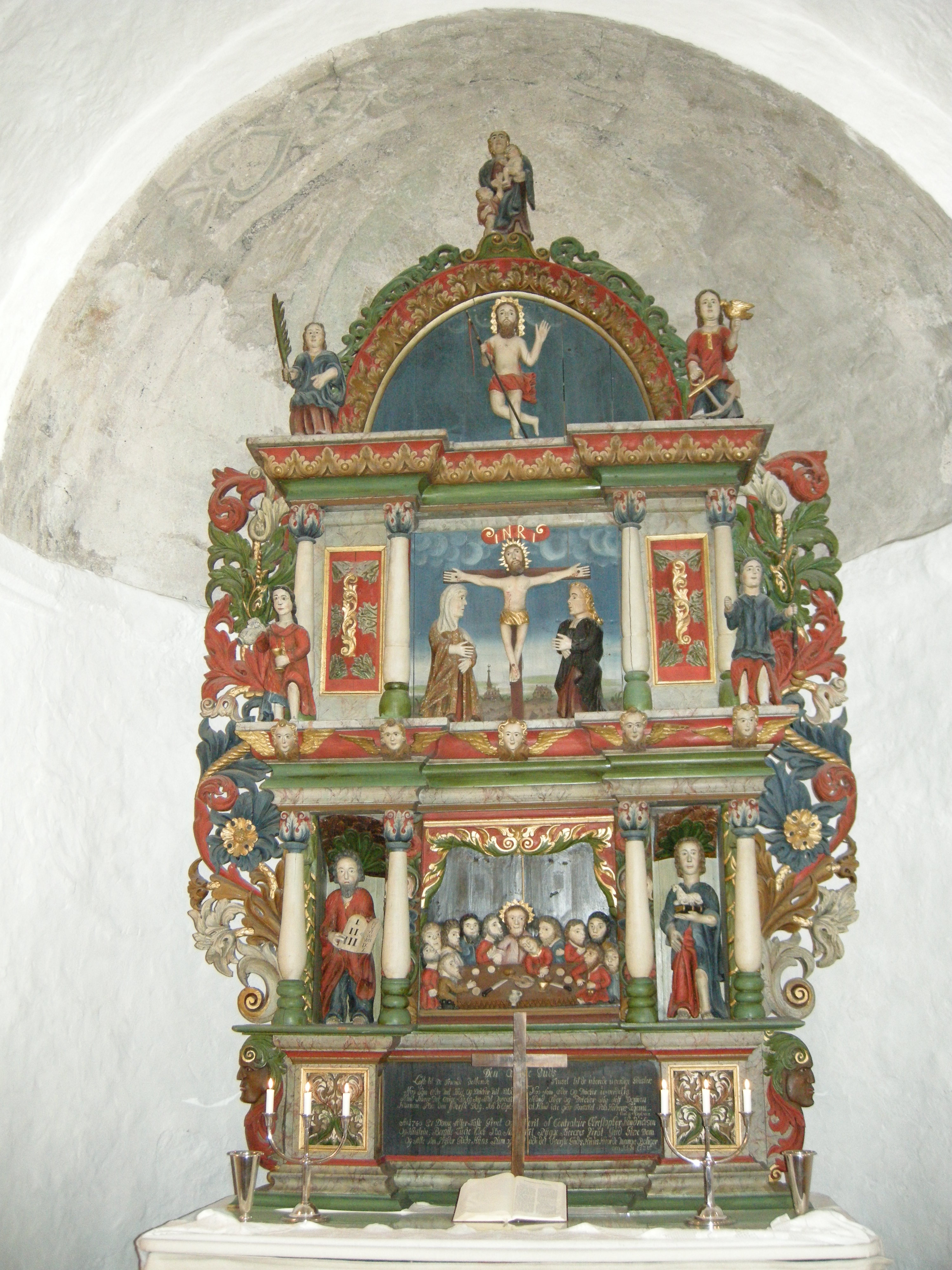
Altarpiece

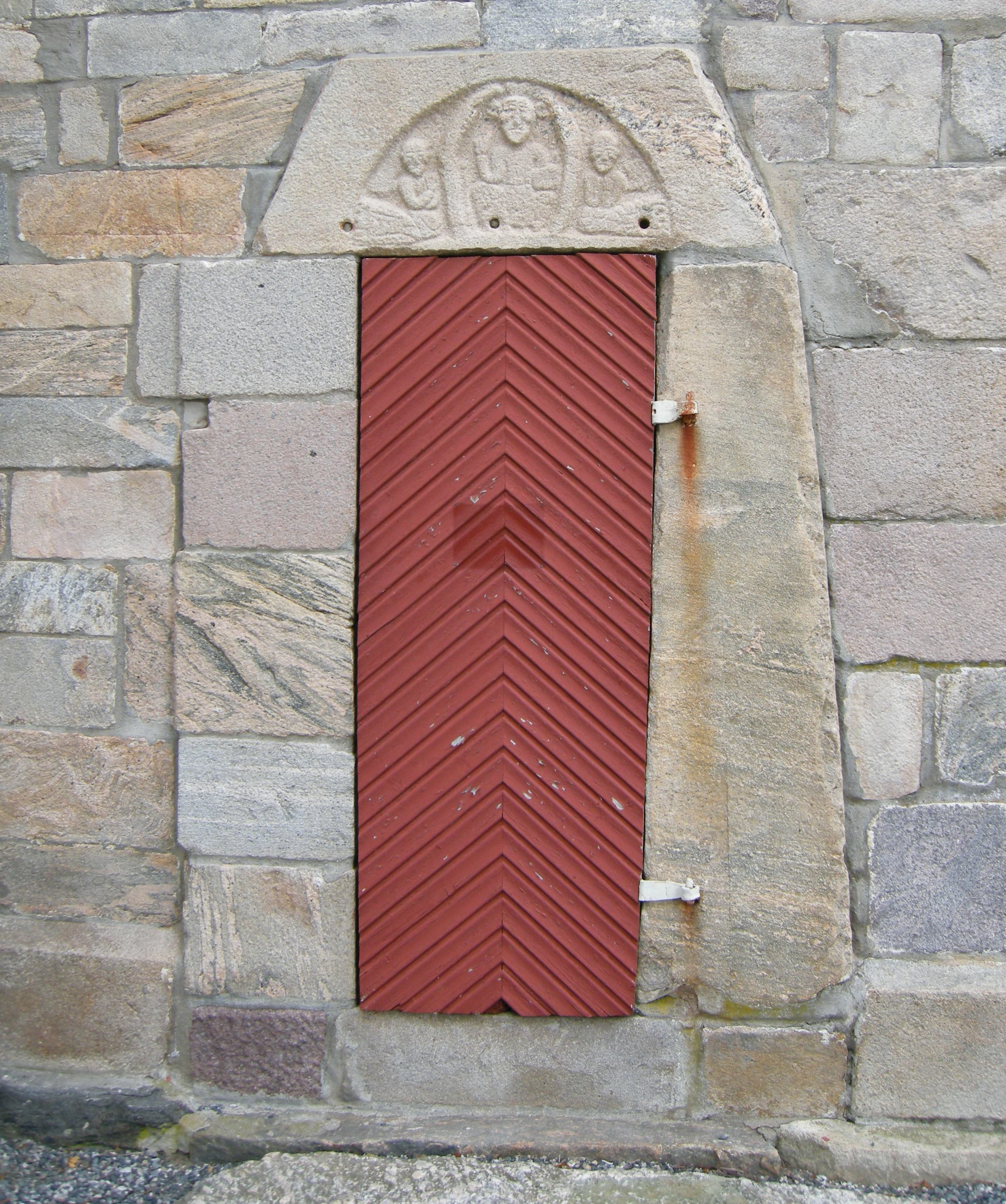
Side door

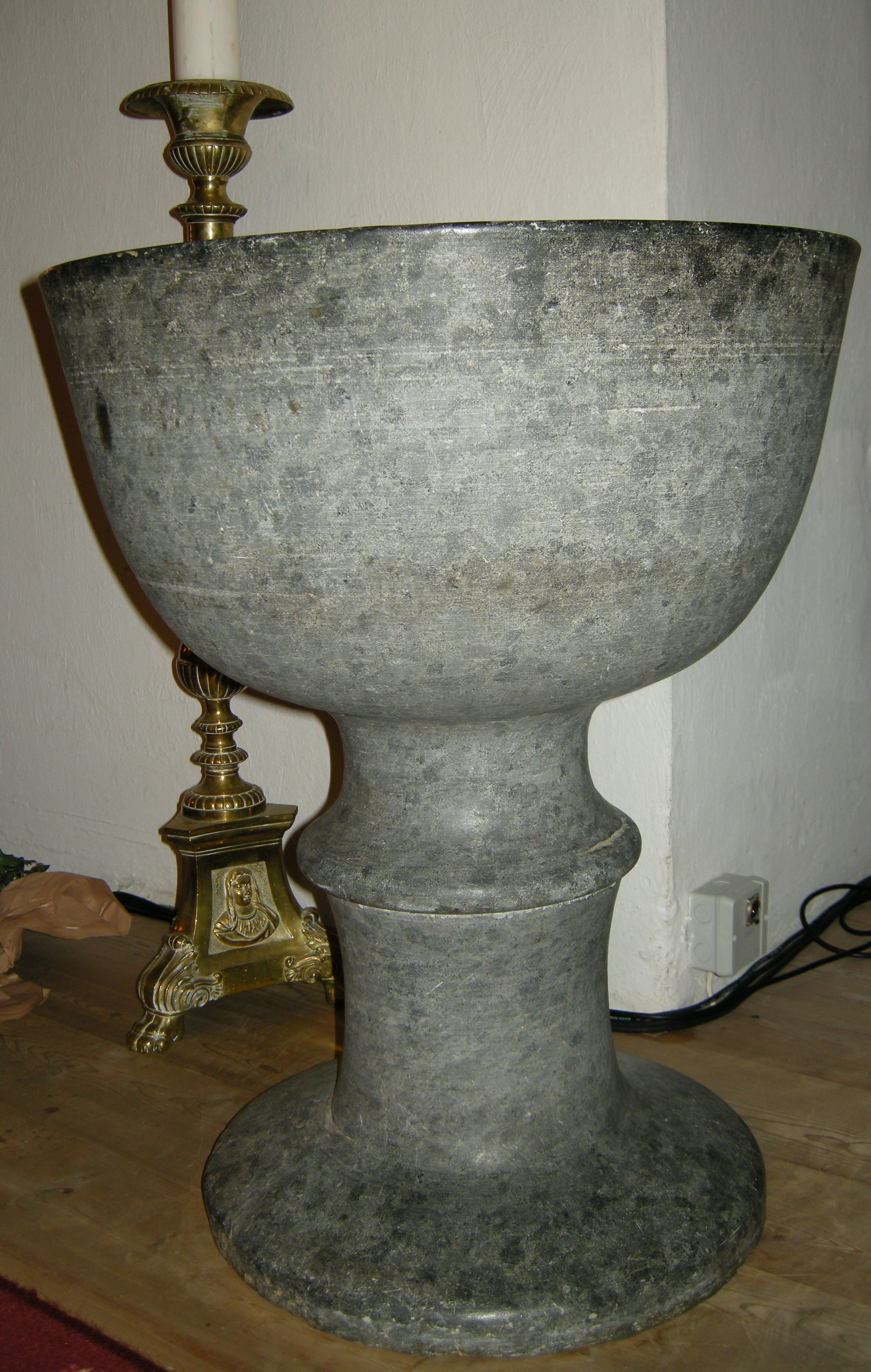
Baptismal font

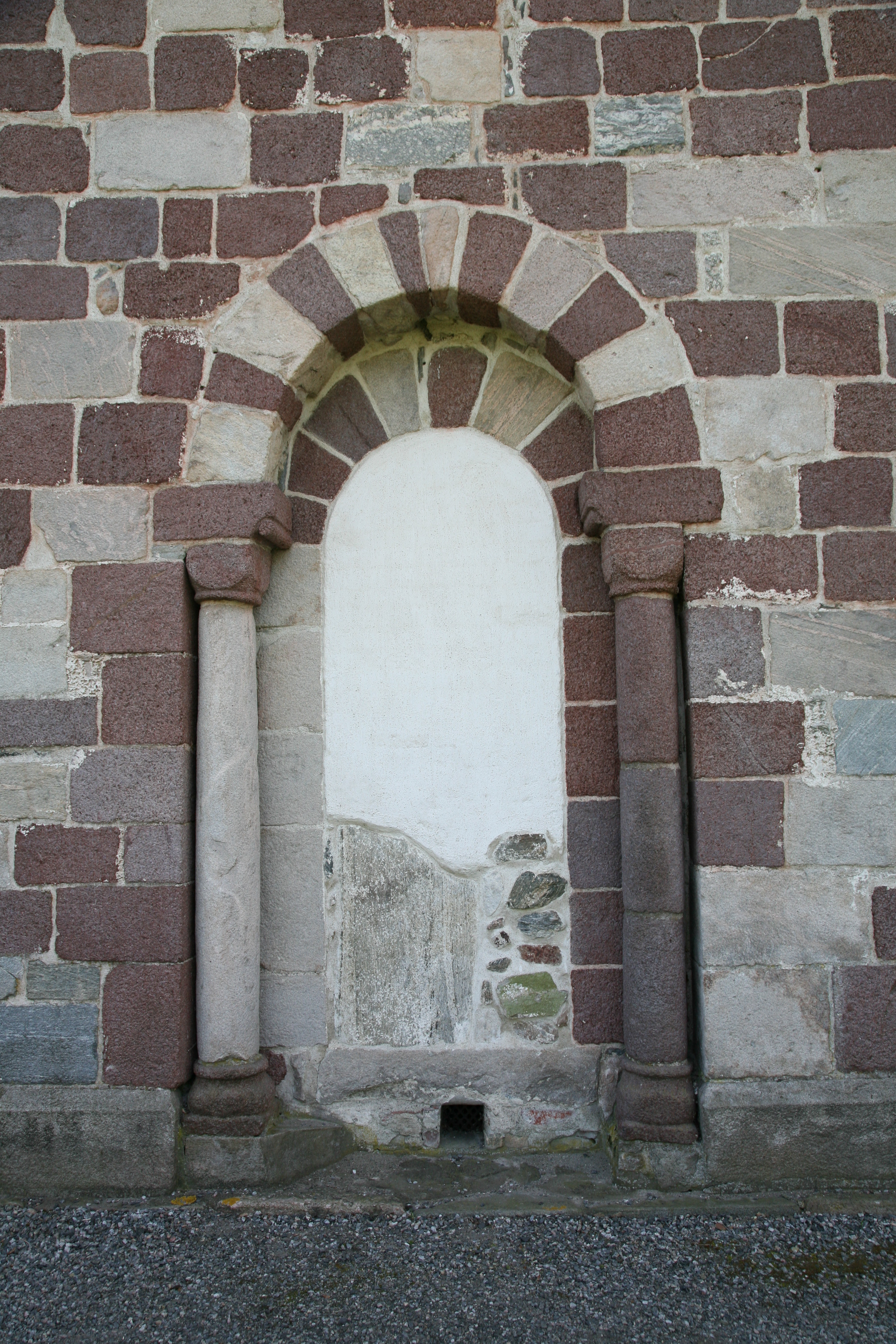
Former archway

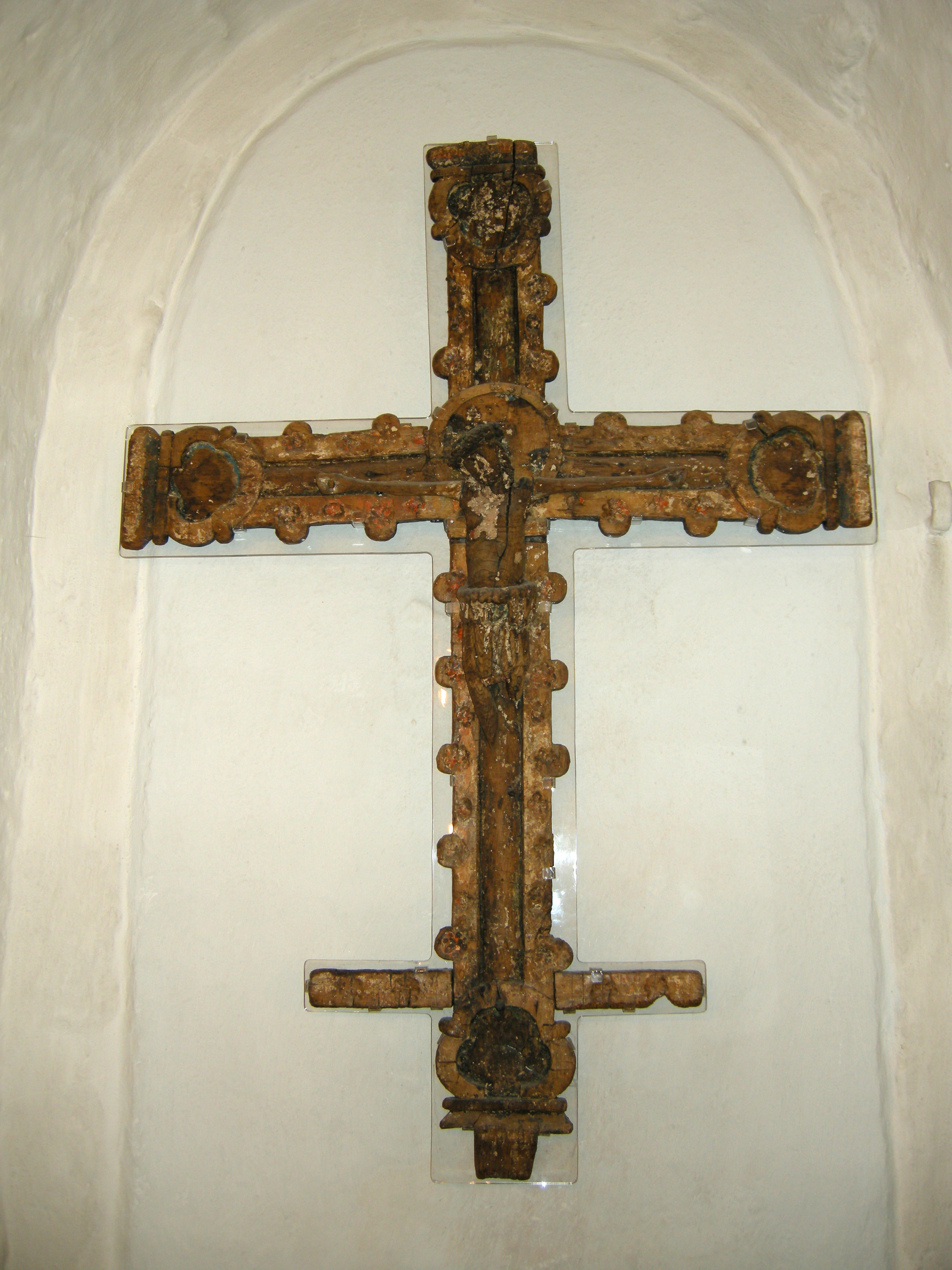
Crucifix

== Climate ==
Climate data for Moss Airport, Rygge 1991-2020 (40 m, extremes 1955-2024, sunhrs from Oslo)
Month	Jan	Feb	Mar	Apr	May	Jun	Jul	Aug	Sep	Oct	Nov	Dec	Year
Record high °C (°F)	11.2 (52.2)	13.5 (56.3)	21 (70)	24.9 (76.8)	30 (86)	31.2 (88.2)	33.9 (93.0)	34.2 (93.6)	27 (81)	20 (68)	16.7 (62.1)	13.2 (55.8)	34.2 (93.6)
Mean daily maximum °C (°F)	0.8 (33.4)	1.5 (34.7)	5.1 (41.2)	10.4 (50.7)	15.8 (60.4)	19.3 (66.7)	21.5 (70.7)	20.7 (69.3)	16.3 (61.3)	10.2 (50.4)	5.2 (41.4)	1.9 (35.4)	10.7 (51.3)
Daily mean °C (°F)	−1.7 (28.9)	−1.5 (29.3)	1.3 (34.3)	5.9 (42.6)	11 (52)	14.8 (58.6)	17.2 (63.0)	16.3 (61.3)	12.3 (54.1)	7.2 (45.0)	2.9 (37.2)	−0.6 (30.9)	7.1 (44.8)
Mean daily minimum °C (°F)	−4.5 (23.9)	−4.4 (24.1)	−2.1 (28.2)	1.8 (35.2)	6.4 (43.5)	10.5 (50.9)	13 (55)	12.3 (54.1)	8.7 (47.7)	4.2 (39.6)	0.4 (32.7)	−3.3 (26.1)	3.6 (38.4)
Record low °C (°F)	−27.7 (−17.9)	−31.5 (−24.7)	−28.4 (−19.1)	−11.6 (11.1)	−4.9 (23.2)	−0.3 (31.5)	3.6 (38.5)	0.7 (33.3)	−5.1 (22.8)	−9.7 (14.5)	−19.5 (−3.1)	−26.5 (−15.7)	−31.5 (−24.7)
Average precipitation mm (inches)	67.3 (2.65)	52.6 (2.07)	49.7 (1.96)	50.7 (2.00)	54.6 (2.15)	76.3 (3.00)	76.5 (3.01)	96.8 (3.81)	88.3 (3.48)	110.6 (4.35)	98.3 (3.87)	76.8 (3.02)	898.5 (35.37)
Average precipitation days (≥ 1.0 mm)	11	9	8	8	9	10	12	13	11	12	12	11	126
Mean monthly sunshine hours	45.1	77.6	146.5	182.0	248.0	230.3	244.1	203.8	150.1	94	50.9	40.0	1,712.4
Source 1: eklima.no/met.no (extremes)
Source 2: NOAA
