= Luthersk Ugeskrift =

Luthersk Ugeskrift ("Lutheran Weekly") was an ecclesiastical periodical issued from 1877 to 1893.

== History and profile ==
Luthersk Ugeskrift was established in 1877 by Wilhelm Bugge and Johan Christian Heuch, who both later served as bishops. The headquarters was in Kristiania (Oslo). It was marked by "high church" views and purported skepticism towards lay preaching and elected congregational councils. In 1881 Michael Johan Færden replaced Bugge as co-editor; Heuch withdrew in 1889. The periodical went defunct in 1893.
