= Adolf Bredo Stabell =

Norwegian politician (1807–1865)

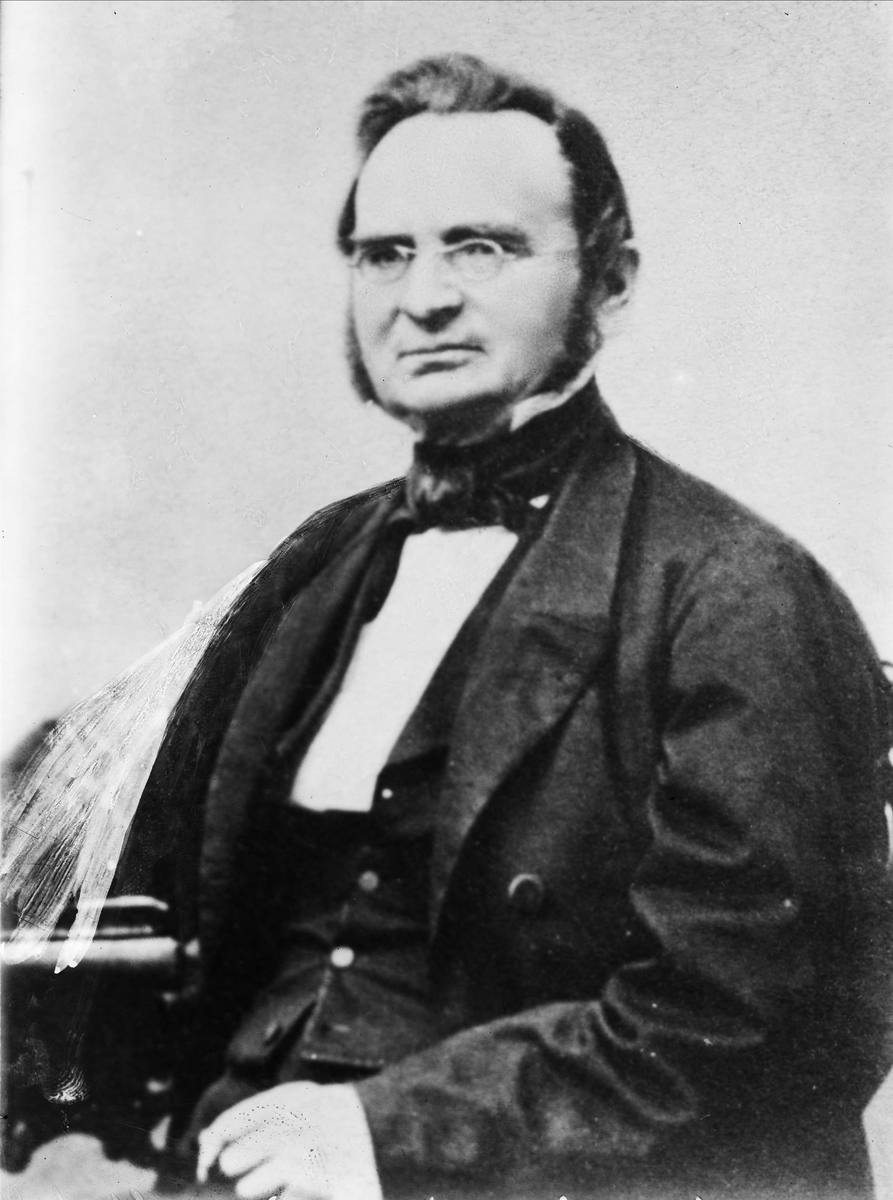
Adolf Bredo Stabell

Adolf Bredo Stabell (19 November 1807 – 21 November 1865) was a Norwegian newspaper editor, banker and politician.

He was born in Trondhjem (now Trondheim) as a son of Nicolai Bredo Stabell (1736–1817) and Karen Bolette Grøgaard (1769–1832). He was married twice. In September 1829 he married Caroline Birgitte Knudtzon (1805–1848). After her death, he married Theodora Adolphine Egidius (1827–1910) in March 1860.

He edited the newspaper Morgenbladet from 1831 to 1857. He was elected to the Parliament of Norway from Akershus Amt in 1844, and was re-elected in 1847, 1850, 1853 and 1856. From 1848 he had served as President of the Odelsting. He co-founded Akers Sparebank in 1842, chairing it from 1846 to 1865, and in 1858 he co-founded Den norske Creditbank which he led from 1858.

== Morgenbladet ==
Stabell joined Morgenbladet a year later, in 1831, the newspaper's owner, Rasmus Hviid. Stabell worked as an editor, with several exchanges, mostly anonymously, as a representative of the newspaper. Under Stabell was the newspaper within a few years more modern compared to the balance between news, commentary, debate and ads. Morgenbladet also took a clear political position of the liberal opposition, which led to the newspaper The Constitutionelle was created as a more government-friendly competitor. The two newspapers frequently disagreed, especially concerning the poets Henrik Wergeland and Johan Sebastian Welhaven, albeit the views of the two varied in the papers. Stabell's role as newspaper editor was concerned with creating an independent newspaper with clear political opinions and news.

Stabell got Ludvig Kristensen Daa into newspaper employee in 1841. In the same year Morgenbladet, which had benefited from Wergeland's contribution in the newspaper, had a major dispute with him, partly because of disagreements between Wergeland and Daa. It meant that the newspaper initially refused Wergeland column space, then accused him of being unsuitable as a bishop because he was "opirret og i slet Lune" ("upset and bad-tempered") and claimed also that Wergeland, having written the poem "Mig Selv", withdrew co-operation for three years. With Daa in the newspaper Wergeland also became less directly active as a journalist.

== Politics ==
Stabell was mayor of Aker in 1839 to 1843 and from 1847 to 1859. The table also made it into parliament in 1845. Table tried to put forward a proposal calling for a new system to replace the ministers, and demands that ministers should participate in Parliament, and thus accountable. This was considered very radical and was later withdrawn. In spite of that chart was relatively radical, he chose the Thrane movement a more government-friendly line. Stabell had been Odelsting president from 1848 to 1857, and in 1858 he became vice-president of the Parliament, but when Stabells house remained in Christiania for urban expansion, were Stabells constituency overwhelmingly governmentally. Thus disappeared chart of Parliament.

== Banking ==
Since he also resigned from the editorial work in Morgenbladet in 1857 (but still had some ownership), he became more active in the banking system. That same year he formed The Norwegian Credit Bank, which was the first private national commercial bank in Norway. He was head of the bank from 1858. Unfortunately for table held The Norwegian Credit Bank to be destroyed already in the beginning as a result of excessive lending policies. This sapped his health, and he died in 1865.

Stabell married 2 September 1829 with Caroline Birgitte Knudtzon (5 October 1805 - 5 April 1848). He remarried on 7 March 1860 with Theodora Adolphine Egidius (10 October 1827 – 10 January 1910). Adolf Bredo Stabell was appointed Knight of St. Olav in 1858.

Media offices
Preceded by	Chief editor of Morgenbladet; 1831–1857	Succeeded by
Business positions
Preceded by Hans Grimelund	Chairman of Akers Sparebank; 1846–1865	Succeeded by Helle Ingier
