= Adolf Bredo Stabell (diplomat) =

Norwegian diplomat (1908–1996)

Adolf Bredo Stabell (12 August 1908 – 5 December 1996) was a Norwegian diplomat.

He was born in Kolbu as a son of attorney Bernhard Dunker Stabell (1878–1929) and Dorothea Antoinette Platou (1883–1964). In 1938 he married American citizen Viola Catherine Jordan. Stabell was a brother of Peter Platou Stabell, a distant descendant of the newspaper editor Adolf Bredo Stabell and father of actress Thea Stabell.

He took the examen artium in 1927 and graduated from the Royal Frederick University with the cand.jur. degree in 1932. He studied abroad, and was then a junior solicitor in Gjøvik and deputy judge in Nordre Hedemarken District Court between 1934 and 1937. In 1937 he was hired as a secretary in the Norwegian Ministry of Justice. He studied at Columbia University from 1939 to 1940, and then, during the Second World War, he served at the Norwegian embassy in the United States.

In 1945 he became assistant secretary in the Ministry of Foreign Affairs. Between 1948 and 1951 he was a legation and embassy counsellor in Brussels, in the United Nations delegation and in Paris. He then became deputy under-secretary of state in the Ministry of Foreign Affairs. He was the Norwegian ambassador to Canada from 1961 to 1966 and Finland from 1966, succeeding Ivar Lunde. From 1972 he was the Norwegian ambassador to Portugal.

He was decorated as a Commander with Star of the Order of St. Olav in 1965. He was a Knight Grand Cross of the Order of the Lion of Finland, Commander with Star of the Order of the Star of Ethiopia, Commander of the Order of the Polar Star and the Order of the Lion and the Sun, Grand Knight with Star of the Order of the Falcon and Officier of the French Légion d'honneur. He died on December 5, 1996, and was buried in Oslo Western Civil Cemetery.
