= Valentin Christian Wilhelm Sibbern =

Norwegian government minister

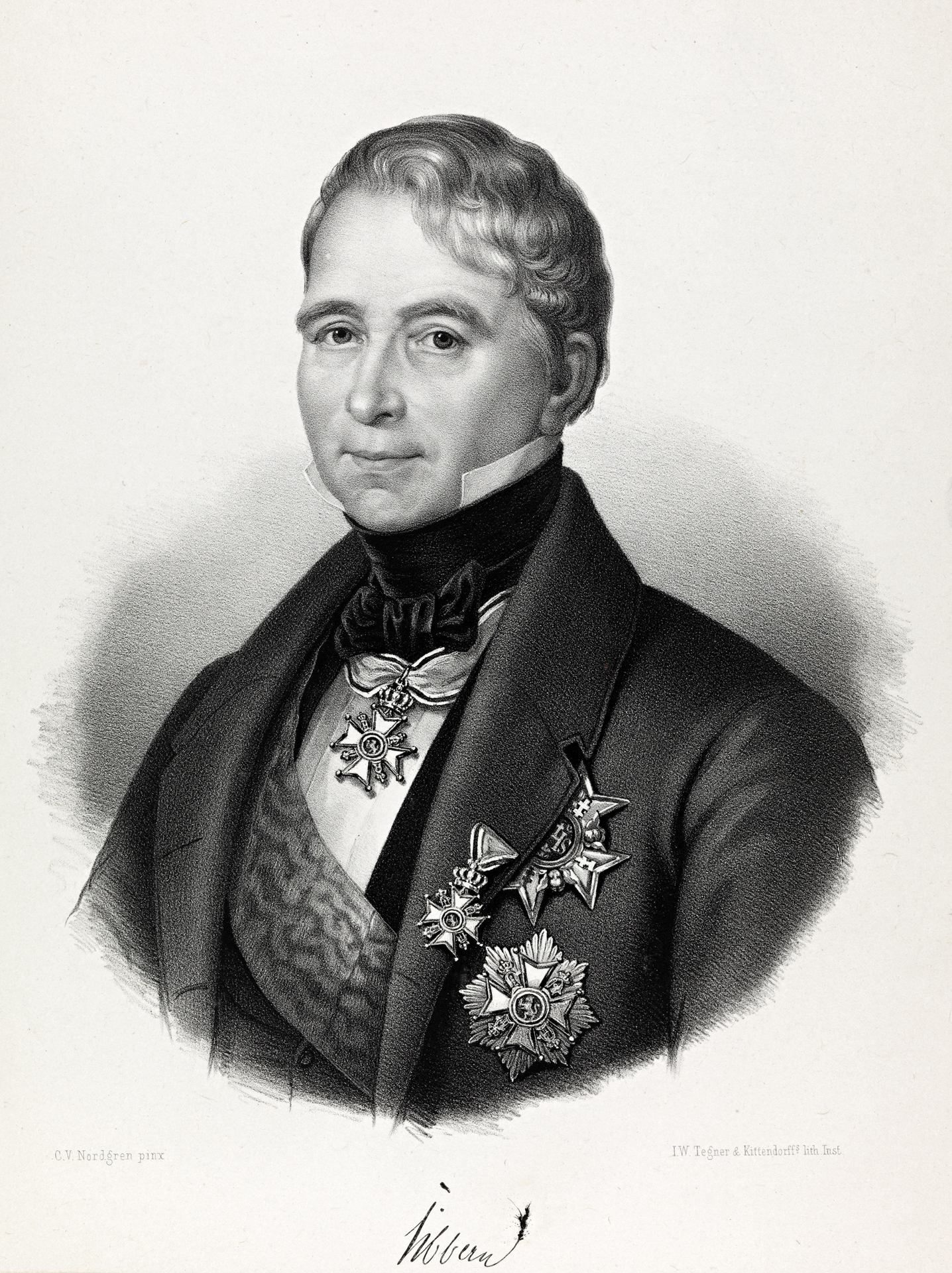
Valentin Christian Wilhelm Sibbern

Valentin Christian Wilhelm Sibbern (19 September 1779 – 1 January 1853) was a Norwegian government minister and representative at the Norwegian Constitutional Assembly.

== Biography ==
Valentin Christian Wilhelm Sibbern was born on the Værne Kloster estate at Rygge in Østfold, Norway. In 1793, he became a student at the Royal Danish Military Academy in Copenhagen. He was promoted to first lieutenant in 1800 and captain of the cavalry and commander of Rakkestadske Company in 1809. He took the legal examination in 1802. He was promoted to major in 1812.

In 1814, he was appointed district governor of Smaalenenes amt (now Østfold). In 1823, he was also appointed district governor of Akershus. Between 1830 and 1852, he served in different positions within the Norwegian government including Minister of Auditing, Minister of Justice, Minister of the Army and Minister of the Navy. He was elected to the Norwegian Parliament in 1814 returning in 1815–1816, 1818, 1821–1822 and 1824.

Valentin Sibbern represented Akershusiske ridende jegerkorps, his military regiment of the Norwegian Army, in the National Assembly at Eidsvoll where he was a member of the independence party (Selvstendighetspartiet).

== Personal life ==
He was married twice, with Alette Margrethe Aagaard (1776–1810) and after her death with Anne Cathrine Stockfleth (1785–1865). He was the father of musician and courtier Alette Due, and Carl Sibbern and Georg Sibbern who was Norwegian prime minister in Stockholm. His younger brother Henrik Frederik Arild Sibbern was also a member of the Norwegian National Assembly at Eidsvold.

== Honors ==
- Order of St. Olav
- Order of the North Star
- Order of the Sword

== Related Reading ==
- Holme Jørn (2014) De kom fra alle kanter – Eidsvollsmennene og deres hus (Oslo: Cappelen Damm) ISBN 978-82-02-44564-5
