= Ole Thorsen =

Norwegian politician (1822–1904)

Ole Thorsen (16 April 1822-25 February 1904) was a Norwegian politician who served in the Storting from 1857 to 1864 and 1868 to 1878.

== Life and career ==
Thorsen was born on 16 April 1822. Thorsen served as a trade officer in Stavanger from 1840 to 1844. He was first elected to the Storting in 1857 as a member from Stavanger Amt. During his tenure in the Storting Thorsen served on the roads committee.

Thorsen bought a farm from his father in law in 1859. He worked as a policeman in Jelsa briefly in 1860. Thorsen served in the Storting from 1857 to 1864 and 1868 to 1878. After leaving the Storting, he served as sheriff of Hetland Municipality from 1877 to 1899, also serving as a watchman at the district prison from 1877 to 1899.

Ole Thorsen died on 25 February 1904.
