= 1829 Norwegian parliamentary election =

- June–28 November 1829

All 81 seats in the Storting 41 seats needed for a majority
- Registered: 61,598
- Turnout: 45.26%
Prime Minister before election
Mathias Sommerhielm
Prime Minister after election
Severin Løvenskiold

Parliamentary elections were held in Norway in 1829. As political parties were not officially established until 1884, all those elected were independents. The number of seats in the Storting was increased from 79 to 81. Voter turnout was 45%, although only 5.5% of the country's population was eligible to vote.

== Results ==
Of the 81 seats, 37 were won by civil servants, 20 by farmers, sheriffs, church singers and teachers and 20 by people with other professions.

Party	Votes	%	Seats
Independents			81
Total			81
Total votes	27,877	–	
Registered voters/turnout	61,598	45.26	
Source: Nohlen & Stöver, NSSDS
