= Hans Jacob Arnold Jensen =

Norwegian military officer and politician

Hans Jacob Arnold Jensen (12 September 1777 – 3 October 1853) was a Norwegian military officer and politician.

Jensen was born at Frogn in Norderhov, Norway. His parents were Thomas Jensen and Giertrud Selmer. He entered military service at the age of 16 in 1793. He graduated from the Norwegian Military Academy ( Den frie mathematiske Skole) in Christiania (now Oslo) in 1794. He married Alethe Kreyberg, his third cousin, on February 17, 1836. He died in Fredrikshald, Norway at the age of 76 and was buried at Ous Kirkegård (now known as Os Gravlund) in Halden. He was elected to the Norwegian Parliament in 1818, representing the constituency of Fredriksstad. He served as a captain at that time. He only sat through one parliamentary term.
