= Michael Færden =

Norwegian priest and author

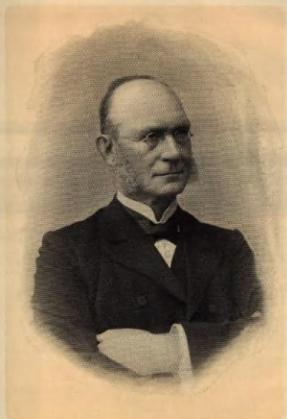
Michael Johan Færden - Aandsbrytningerne indenfor urkristendommen

Michael Johan Færden (24 December 1836 – 17 June 1912) was a Norwegian priest and author.

He was born in Norderhov in Buskerud as a son of farmer and bank treasurer Thor A. Færden (1804–1879) and Ellen M. Vager (1811–1886). He was a first cousin once removed of Anders Færden and Wilhelm Hansen Færden, and first cousin of politician Olaus Færden.

In May 1866 he married physician's daughter Hermine Alida Georgine Wisbech (1837–1918). Their son Alf Georg Færden, a physician, was married to pianist Elisabeth Reiss for fifteen years, a daughter of Georg Reiss. Another son named Christian Wisbech was an engineer, and married a daughter of August Kallevig—and sister of Waldemar C. Kallevig.

Færden finished his secondary education in 1855 and graduated from the Royal Frederick University with the cand.theol. degree in 1861. Færden was a teacher at Hartvig Nissens skole from 1858. He was chaplain at Vang Church in Hedmark in 1867. From 1875, he served as a priest in Christiana (now Oslo) at a work institution for the poor (fattigvesenets anstalt). He became vicar in Røyken Church in Buskerud in 1881, and vicar at Norderhov Church (in his hometown) from 1891 to his death in 1912.

He was known as a prolific public debater on religion and theology. He also issued a number of books. Færden was the editor of the journal Folkevennen from 1866 to 1867 and Hjemmet from 1876 to 1880. He was also coeditor of the Luthersk Ugeskrift from 1881 to 1893 and Kirkelig Litteraturtidene for de Skandinaviske Lande in 1894.

== Selected works ==
- Det gamle testamente i lyset af den nyere bibelforskning (1902)
- Kampen om det gamle trestamente (1904)
- Aandsbrytningene indenfor Israel (1908)
- Kampene paa Hadeland og i Norderhov (1910)
- Aandsbrytningene indenfor urkristendommen (1912)
