= Norwegian Military Academy =

Military academy in Oslo, Norway

- Krigsskolen
- Motto in English: Let him who desires peace prepare for war
- Type: Military academy
- Parent institution: Norwegian Defence University College
- Affiliations: Norwegian Army
- Commander: Colonel Sigrid Engebretsen-Skaret
- Location: Oslo, Norway
- Website: www.forsvaret.no/utdanning/bachelorutdanninger-og-arsstudium

The Norwegian Military Academy (Krigsskolen), in Oslo, educates officers of the Norwegian Army and serves as the King's Royal Guard. The academy was established in 1750, and is the oldest institution for higher education in Norway.

== History ==
The Commander-in-Chief of the Norwegian armed forces, Hans Jacob Arnold Jensen, sent a request to the King of Denmark-Norway in 1750 to establish a school of mathematics in Christiania. The King determined, through the Royal Resolution of 16 December 1751, to establish The Free Mathematical School (Den frie matematiske skole). It was the first institution offering higher education in Norway, but it did not give any extensive military education. The students were recruited from the officer corps or from nobles in military service.

After a reorganization in 1804, the school became an officer school and an independent unit with its own command. From 1876 to 1880 a college degree was required to apply. The school was first established at 10 Tollbugata in Oslo. It was moved to St. Olavsplass in 1899 and in 1918 it was moved back to Tollbugata 10. In 1969, it was moved to Linderud, where it is currently located.

Between 1984 and 1995 Krigsskolen Gimlemoen in Kristiansand was also in operation. This was a 2-year degree (in addition to a one-year NCO/Sergeant schools, and at least one year service as an NCO as a requirement for admission). Students from KSG were awarded a commission as officers in the Army.

In 2003, the Military Academy was obligated to follow the Law of Universities and granted the right to award bachelor's degrees.

== Application and selection ==
Applicants must be Norwegian citizens aged between 18 and 25, pass drafting, pass health requirements, pass minimum requirements on physical tests and have higher education entrance qualifications.

=== Selection ===
The applicants will first go through the Armed Forces' admission and selection process at Camp Sessvollmoen, common for all higher education in the armed forces.

Applicants must pass a series of psychological and physical tests, medical examinations, and interviews. Those who pass the first part of the admission process must then complete a selection exercise.

The applicants who are best suited will be offered to start at the school.

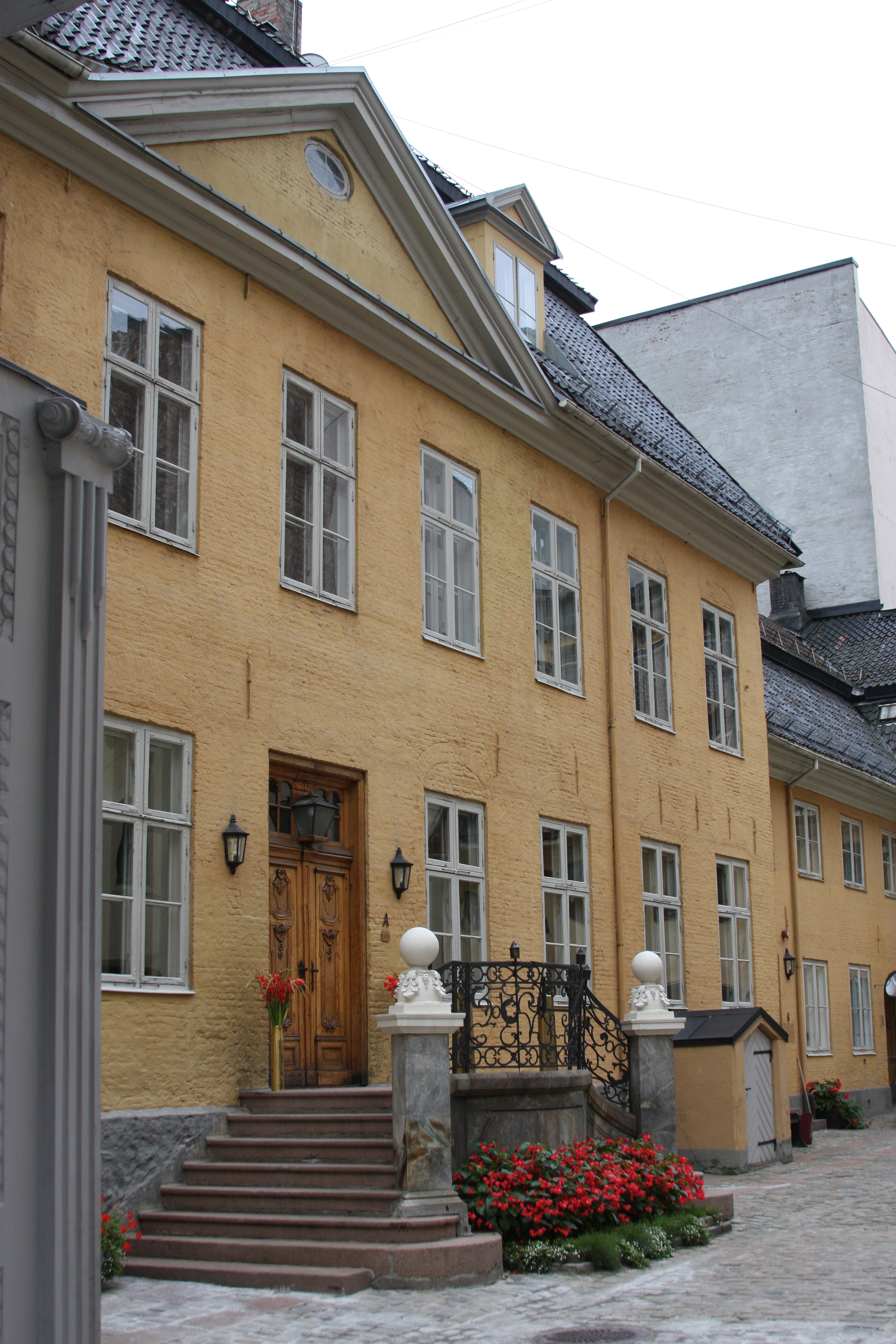
The entrance to the old Academy building located in Tollbugata

== Organization and education ==
The academy is a part of the Norwegian Defence University College. The academy offers three courses:

- Bachelor's degree in Military Studies with a specialisation in Leadership and Land Power.
- Bachelor in military studies with specialisation in leadership – Military Logistics.
- Bachelor's Degree in Military Studies with a specialisation in Leadership and Construction Technology.

== Training ==
During the courses, the cadets complete several field exercises to train leadership, tactics and decision-making.

== Traditions ==
The classes have a tradition of taking names from Norwegian officers, inspiring the cadets to follow in their paths. The Norwegian Military Academy performs ceremonial duties for the King of Norway. A parade is conducted every 16 December to celebrate the establishment of the academy. In addition, the academy conducts a parade on 8 May, to celebrate the Liberation Day or Veteran Day.

=== Standards ===
Current Standard since 1991 under Harald V of Norway

Standard between 1957 and 1991 under Olav V of Norway

Standard between 1914 and 1957 under Haakon VII of Norway

== See also ==
- Royal Norwegian Air Force Academy
- Royal Norwegian Naval Academy
