= 1870 Norwegian parliamentary election =

| ← 1868 | May 1870–14 February 1871 | 1873 → |

All 111 seats in the Storting 55 seats needed for a majority
- Registered: 81,329
- Turnout: 45.06%
Prime Minister before election
Frederik Gottschalck Haxthausen Due
Prime Minister after election
Frederik Gottschalck Haxthausen Due

Parliamentary elections were held in Norway in 1870. As political parties were not officially established until 1884, all those elected were independents. Voter turnout was 45%, although only 5% of the country's population was eligible to vote.

== Results ==
Of the 111 seats, 62 were won by farmers, sheriffs, church singers and teachers, 25 by civil servants and 24 by people with other professions.

| Party | Votes | % | Seats |
|---|---|---|---|
| Independents | | | 111 |
| Total | | | 111 |
| Total votes | 36,647 | – | |
| Registered voters/turnout | 81,329 | 45.06 | |
Source: Nohlen & Stöver, NSSDS
