= Hans Jenssen =

Norwegian businessman and politician

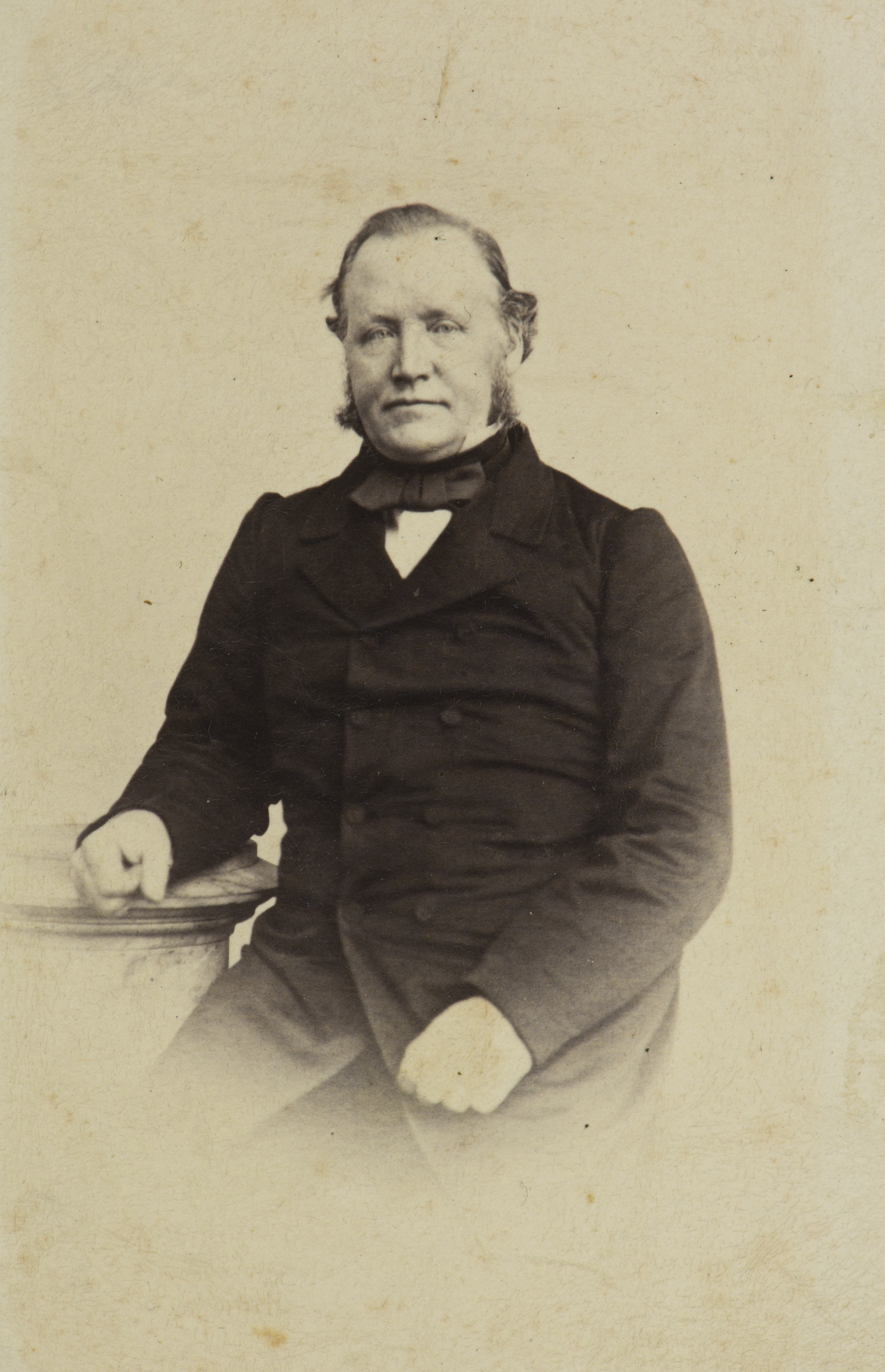
Hans Jenssen, before 1882

Hans Jenssen (4 December 1817 – 13 June 1888) was a Norwegian businessperson.

He was born in Øyer Municipality, but came to Trondheim with his brother Torger (1822–1892) in 1834. The two established their own wholesale company H. & T. Jenssen in 1850. His brother withdrew in 1865, leaving the business to Hans.

Hans Jenssen also served as a deputy representative to the Norwegian Parliament in 1864, representing the constituency of the city of Trondheim.

Jenssen died in Trondheim.
