= 1873 Norwegian parliamentary election =

← 1870	May 1873–14 February 1874	1876 →

All 111 seats in the Storting 56 seats needed for a majority
- Registered: 81,970
- Turnout: 45.63%
Prime Minister before election
Frederik Gottschalck Haxthausen Due
Prime Minister after election
Frederik Gottschalck Haxthausen Due

Parliamentary elections were held in Norway in 1873. As political parties were not officially established until 1884, all those elected were independents. Voter turnout was 46%, although only 5% of the country's population was eligible to vote.

== Results ==
Of the 111 seats, 50 were won by farmers, sheriffs, church singers and teachers, 32 by civil servants and 29 by people with other professions.

Party	Votes	%	Seats
Independents			111
Total			111
Total votes	37,399	–	
Registered voters/turnout	81,970	45.63	
Source: Nohlen & Stöver, NSSDS
