= 1850 Norwegian parliamentary election =

- May–21 October 1850

All 106 seats in the Storting 54 seats needed for a majority
- Registered: 73,125
- Turnout: 50.28%
Prime Minister before election
Frederik Gottschalck Haxthausen Due
Prime Minister after election
Frederik Gottschalck Haxthausen Due

Parliamentary elections were held in Norway in 1850. As political parties were not officially established until 1884, all those elected were independents. The number of seats in the Storting was increased from 105 to 106. Voter turnout was 50%, although only 5% of the country's population was eligible to vote.

== Results ==
Of the 106 seats, 45 were won by civil servants, 35 by farmers, sheriffs, church singers and teachers, and 19 by people with other professions.

Party	Votes	%	Seats
Independents			106
Total			106
Total votes	36,770	–	
Registered voters/turnout	73,125	50.28	
Source: Nohlen & Stöver, NSSDS
