= 1868 Norwegian parliamentary election =

← 1865	February–5 July 1868	1870 →

All 111 seats in the Storting 56 seats needed for a majority
- Registered: 81,278
- Turnout: 47.64%
Prime Minister before election
Frederik Gottschalck Haxthausen Due
Prime Minister after election
Frederik Gottschalck Haxthausen Due

Parliamentary elections were held in Norway in 1868. As political parties were not officially established until 1884, all those elected were independents. Voter turnout was 48%, although only 5% of the country's population was eligible to vote.

== Results ==
Of the 111 seats, 56 were won by farmers, sheriffs, church singers and teachers, 31 by civil servants and 24 by people with other professions.

Party	Votes	%	Seats
Independents			111
Total			111
Total votes	38,724	–	
Registered voters/turnout	81,278	47.64	
Source: Nohlen & Stöver, NSSDS
