= Carl Sibbern =

Norwegian politician

Carl Sibbern (11 April 1809 – 17 May 1880) was a Norwegian politician, son of Valentin Christian Wilhelm Sibbern and brother of Alette Due.

He was County Governor of Smaalenenes Amt (today named Østfold) from 1855 to 1880.

He was elected to the Norwegian Parliament in 1857, 1859, 1862, 1865 and 1868, representing his county.

Preceded by Christian Birch-Reichenwald	County Governor of Østfold; 1855–1880	Succeeded by Johan Lauritz Rasch
