= 1823 Norwegian parliamentary election =

- June 1823–20 February 1824

All 77 seats in the Storting 39 seats needed for a majority
- Registered: 62,469
Prime Minister before election
Peder Anker
Prime Minister after election
Mathias Sommerhielm

Parliamentary elections were held in Norway in 1823. As political parties were not officially established until 1884, all those elected were independents.

== Results ==
Of the 77 seats, 36 were won by civil servants, 24 by farmers, sheriffs, church singers and teachers and 17 by people with other professions.

Party	Votes	%	Seats
Independents			77
Total			77
Registered voters/turnout	62,469	–	
Source: Nohlen & Stöver, NSSDS
