= 1853 Norwegian parliamentary election =

- Mai–14 November 1853

All 107 seats in the Storting 54 seats needed for a majority
- Registered: 73,422
- Turnout: 45.45%
Prime Minister before election
Frederik Gottschalck Haxthausen Due
Prime Minister after election
Frederik Gottschalck Haxthausen Due

Parliamentary elections were held in Norway in 1853. As political parties were not officially established until 1884, all those elected were independents. The number of seats in the Storting was increased from 106 to 107. Voter turnout was 45%, although only 5% of the country's population was eligible to vote.

== Results ==
Of the 107 seats, 44 were won by farmers, sheriffs, church singers and teachers, 41 by civil servants and 22 by people with other professions.

Party	Votes	%	Seats
Independents			107
Total			107
Total votes	33,370	–	
Registered voters/turnout	73,422	45.45	
Source: Nohlen & Stöver, NSSDS
