= Rygge =

Rygge Municipality Rygge kommune
- Former municipality
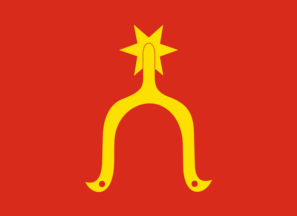
- Flag Coat of arms

- Østfold within Norway

- Rygge within Østfold
- Coordinates: 59°22′29″N 10°42′53″E
- Country: Norway
- County: Østfold
- Administrative centre: Rygge

Government
  - Mayor (2007): Inger-Lise Skartlien (Ap)

Area (upon dissolution)
  - Total: 74 km^{2} (29 sq mi)
  - Land: 70 km^{2} (27 sq mi)
  - Rank: #400 in Norway

Population (2004)
  - Total: 13,753
  - Rank: #76 in Norway
  - Density: 197/km^{2} (510/sq mi)
  - Change (10 years): ▲ +12.8%
- Demonym: Ryggesokning

Official language
  - Norwegian form: Bokmål
- Time zone: UTC+01:00 (CET)
  - Summer (DST): UTC+02:00 (CEST)
- ISO 3166 code: NO-0136
- Website: Official website

Rygge was a municipality in Østfold county, Norway. It was merged into Moss municipality on 1 January 2020. The administrative centre of the municipality is the village of Rygge. Rygge was established as a municipality on 1 January 1838 (see formannskapsdistrikt).

The emblem of Rygge is the Pasque flower. Rygge is connected to Oslo by double-tracked railway, and four-lane freeway.

Rygge was served by Moss Airport, which has not been operational since 2016.

== General information ==
Number of minorities (1st and 2nd generation) in Rygge by country of origin in 2017
| Ancestry | Number |
|---|---|
| Poland | 463 |
| Vietnam | 267 |
| Pakistan | 135 |
| Sweden | 116 |
| Turkey | 114 |
| Lithuania | 87 |
| Denmark | 69 |
| Iraq | 60 |

=== Name ===
The municipality (originally the parish) is named after the old Rygge farm, since the first church was built there. The Old Norse form of the name is not known (the oldest manuscripts from 1353-1528 use the form "Ryg(g)jof"). A possible (but uncertain) reconstruction is Rýgjuhof. The first element would then be the genitive case of rýgja, a sideform of rýgr which means "lady". (Like ylgja to ylgr, both forms with the meaning 'she-wolf'.) The last element is probably hof meaning "temple". If this is correct, then the word rýgja most probably is referring to the goddess Freyja, since the meaning of the word freyja also is 'lady'.

An alternative explanation is that the word is derived from "rygg", which means "ridge", and related to place names like "Ryen" further east. The "ridge" in question would be the end moraine that runs across the landscape here, from the other side of the fjord and stretching east through Sweden and into the Baltic region. In Østfold, this moraine is referred to as the "Raet".

=== Coat-of-arms ===
The coat-of-arms is from modern times. It was granted on 30 November 1984. The arms show a golden spur on a red background. A spur like this was found in the area that dated back to the Viking Age. It is one of the largest golden items that was ever found in Norway and was thus chosen as a symbol on the arms.

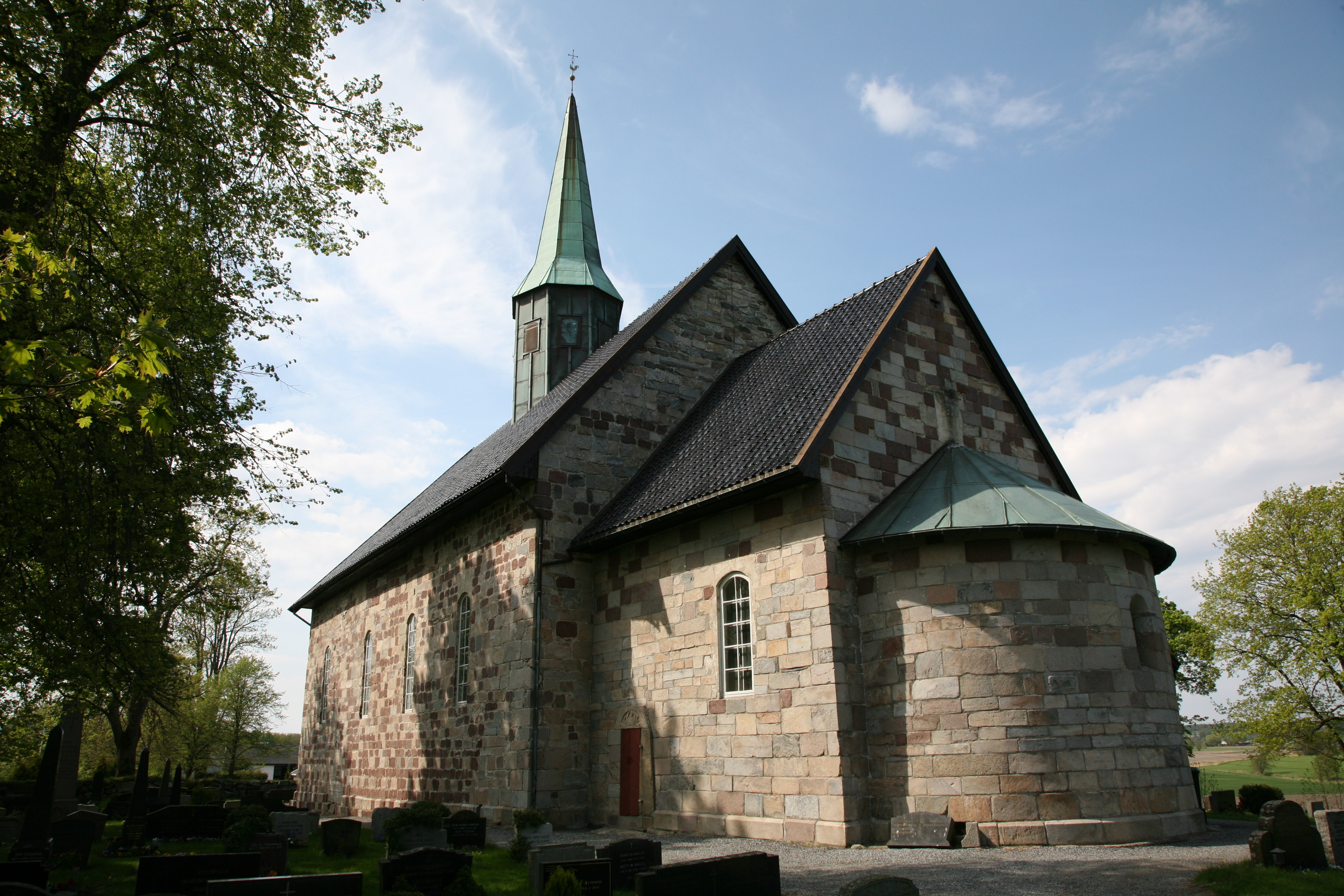
Rygge Church

=== Rygge Church ===
Rygge church (Rygge kirke) is a medieval era church located in the village of Kirkegrenda. The church belongs to Vestre Borgesyssel deanery in Diocese of Borg. Rygge church is one of the county's better preserved medieval stone churches. It is built around the year 1170. Rygge church was originally a chapter church, which had income from a larger area than a parish and contained several villages. The building is characterized by the use of large stones, partly of granite, but parts of the facade is carved of stone cultivar, including large parts of the north portal. It has a long nave and lower and narrower choir. The church was restored in 1967.

== Military ==
Rygge Air Station replaced a temporary airfield constructed by German forces during World War II. The contemporary airfield, northeast of the highway and main railway, is situated in Rygge and its neighbouring municipality Råde. It was constructed from 1952 to 1954 and until recently it was one of the largest establishments of the Royal Norwegian Air Force. The military use of the airfield is now much reduced. A civilian air terminal Moss Airport, Rygge, was opened in early 2008. The airport was closed to all civilian traffic on 1 November 2016 after its main commercial operator, Ryanair, decided to shut down its base there.

== Climate ==
Climate data for Rygge 1961-1990, extremes 1958-1982
| Month | Jan | Feb | Mar | Apr | May | Jun | Jul | Aug | Sep | Oct | Nov | Dec | Year |
|---|---|---|---|---|---|---|---|---|---|---|---|---|---|
| Record high °C (°F) | 11.1 (52.0) | 12.8 (55.0) | 14.8 (58.6) | 19.7 (67.5) | 26.9 (80.4) | 31.0 (87.8) | 30.4 (86.7) | 34.2 (93.6) | 25.0 (77.0) | 20.0 (68.0) | 14.7 (58.5) | 12.1 (53.8) | 34.2 (93.6) |
| Mean daily maximum °C (°F) | −1.2 (29.8) | −0.6 (30.9) | 3.6 (38.5) | 8.8 (47.8) | 15.4 (59.7) | 19.7 (67.5) | 20.8 (69.4) | 19.9 (67.8) | 15.4 (59.7) | 10.2 (50.4) | 4.1 (39.4) | 0.5 (32.9) | 9.7 (49.5) |
| Mean daily minimum °C (°F) | −7.4 (18.7) | −7.8 (18.0) | −4.1 (24.6) | −0.1 (31.8) | 5.4 (41.7) | 9.7 (49.5) | 11.1 (52.0) | 10.2 (50.4) | 6.9 (44.4) | 3.7 (38.7) | −1.7 (28.9) | −5.9 (21.4) | 1.7 (35.0) |
| Record low °C (°F) | −21.7 (−7.1) | −24.2 (−11.6) | −22.1 (−7.8) | −7.4 (18.7) | −1.4 (29.5) | 0.0 (32.0) | 4.8 (40.6) | 2.5 (36.5) | −4.1 (24.6) | −9.7 (14.5) | −13.1 (8.4) | −26.5 (−15.7) | −26.5 (−15.7) |
| Average precipitation mm (inches) | 58 (2.3) | 43 (1.7) | 54 (2.1) | 43 (1.7) | 57 (2.2) | 63 (2.5) | 73 (2.9) | 88 (3.5) | 94 (3.7) | 106 (4.2) | 87 (3.4) | 63 (2.5) | 829 (32.7) |
| Average precipitation days | 9.8 | 7.4 | 8.8 | 7.4 | 8.3 | 9.2 | 9.2 | 10.1 | 10.8 | 11.7 | 11.6 | 9.4 | 113.7 |
Source: met Norway Eklima

== See also ==
- Kirkegrenda, a village in the municipality
- Møvik, a village in the municipality
