= 1859 Norwegian parliamentary election =

- March–23 June 1859

All 117 seats in the Storting 59 seats needed for a majority
- Registered: 78,034
- Turnout: 47.68%
Prime Minister before election
Frederik Gottschalck Haxthausen Due
Prime Minister after election
Frederik Gottschalck Haxthausen Due

Parliamentary elections were held in Norway in 1859. As political parties were not officially established until 1884, all those elected were independents. The number of seats in the Storting was increased from 111 to 117. Voter turnout was 48%, although only 5% of the country's population was eligible to vote.

== Results ==
Of the 117 seats, 47 were won by farmers, sheriffs, church singers and teachers, 33 by civil servants and 37 by people with other professions.

Party	Votes	%	Seats
Independents			117
Total			117
Total votes	37,203	–	
Registered voters/turnout	78,034	47.68	
Source: Nohlen & Stöver, NSSDS

== Aftermath ==
During the parliamentary session the classical liberal Reformforeningen was founded by 37 MPs.
