= 1862 Norwegian parliamentary election =

- January–4 July 1862

All 111 seats in the Storting 56 seats needed for a majority
- Registered: 78,830
- Turnout: 44.59%
Prime Minister before election
Frederik Gottschalck Haxthausen Due
Prime Minister after election
Frederik Gottschalck Haxthausen Due

Parliamentary elections were held in Norway in 1862. As political parties were not officially established until 1884, all those elected were independents. The number of seats in the Storting was reduced from 117 to 111. Voter turnout was 45%, although only 5% of the country's population was eligible to vote.

== Results ==
Of the 111 seats, 47 were won by farmers, sheriffs, church singers and teachers, 37 by civil servants and 26 by people with other professions.

Party	Votes	%	Seats
Independents			111
Total			111
Total votes	35,148	–	
Registered voters/turnout	78,830	44.59	
Source: Nohlen & Stöver, NSSDS
