= Frederik Due =

Norwegian prime minister (1796–1873)

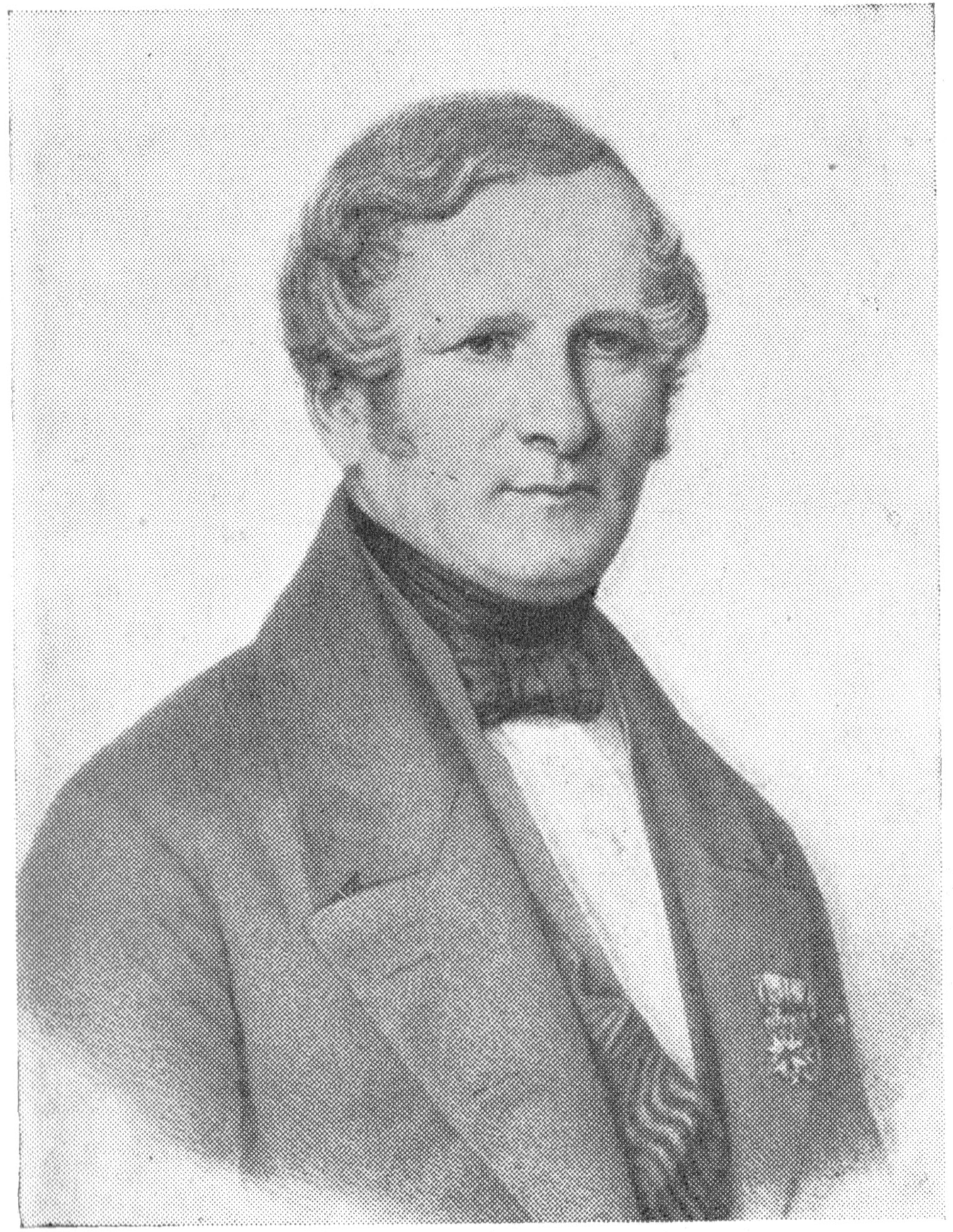

Norwegian Prime Minister in Stockholm
- In office 27 February 1841 – 16 December 1858
- Monarchs: Charles III John; Oscar I
- Preceded by: Severin Løvenskiold
- Succeeded by: Georg Sibbern

State Secretary at the Norwegian Council of State Division in Stockholm
- In office 1823–1841

Personal details
- Born: 14 April 1796 Trondheim, Norway
- Died: 16 October 1873 (aged 77) Christiania, Norway
- Spouse: Alethe Wilhelmine Georgine Sibbern

Frederik Gottschalck Haxthausen Due (14 April 1796 – 16 October 1873) was a Norwegian military officer and statesman. Born in Trondheim, he entered the military at an early age, and took part in the Swedish-Norwegian War of 1814. After the two countries entered into union, Due was recruited to the Swedish court, where he was appointed Norwegian state secretary in Stockholm in 1823. In 1841 he became the Norwegian prime minister, and acted as interpreter for Charles XIV John. After resigning in 1858, he spent the years until 1871 as an ambassador to Vienna and Munich.

== Early life and career ==
Due was born in Trondheim, the son of merchant Carsten Schjødt Due (1762–1809) and Pauline Heltzen (1776–1850). His father's family originated from Duved in Jämtland, Sweden, where from the family name derived. His great-grandfather on his mother's side was Frederik Gottschalck von Haxthausen, who had served as First Minister of Norway for a short period in 1814.

At thirteen years of age, Due began his military education at the Artillery Institute in Copenhagen, Denmark. By 1813 he was a second lieutenant. He took part in the Swedish-Norwegian War of 1814, but after the union between the two countries was a fact, he was recruited by the Swedish court. In 1815, he was made adjutant to Prince Oscar – the later King Oscar I. Due's career was rapid from this point on, helped by his fluency in French. He advanced to the ranks of lieutenant in 1818, and captain in 1819. In 1822, he was promoted to major, and at the same time constituted as Norwegian state secretary in Stockholm, a position to which he was formally appointed the next year. Due now served as interpreter between the francophone King Charles XIV John and his Norwegian cabinet.

== Prime minister ==
In 1841, Prime Minister Severin Løvenskiold was appointed Governor-general of Norway, Due succeeded him as prime minister on 27 February. This made him the first non-noble prime minister of Norway, a fact that was well received by the more radical elements of the press. His came off to a bad start, however, when he decided to keep the government in Christiania (today's Oslo) out of the negotiations over the important Øresund toll. The episode sparked a constitutional crisis, and almost led to Due's impeachment. Once the crisis passed, however, the rest of his tenure as prime minister went by without major difficulties.

After the death of King Charles John in 1844, Due had an equally good working relationship with King Oscar. After the king fell ill in 1858, however, tensions emerged between the regent Prince Charles and the government in Norway. Jørgen Herman Vogt, First Minister in Christiania, resigned early in December, which forced Due to resign his position shortly afterwards.

== Later life, family and honours ==
After resigning as prime minister, Due was appointed Swedish-Norwegian ambassador to the courts in Vienna and Munich. He remained in this position until 1871, when he retired. He settled down in Copenhagen, but moved to Christiania in 1873, where he died later the same year. He is buried at Vår Frelsers gravlund in Oslo.

On 28 February 1828, Frederik Due married Alethe Wilhelmine Georgine Sibbern (1812–1887), the daughter of councillor of state Valentin Christian Wilhelm Sibbern (1779–1853). This marriage also made him brother-in-law of later prime minister Georg Sibbern. His nephew was architect Paul Due.

Due had a keen interest in science; in 1826 was made honorary member of the Royal Swedish Academy of War Sciences, and in 1829 member of the Royal Norwegian Society of Sciences and Letters. He received the Order of the Polar Star in 1823, and the Grand Cross of the Royal Norwegian Order of St. Olav in 1858.
