= List of highways numbered 263 =

The following highways are numbered 263:

== Canada ==
- Manitoba Provincial Road 263 (former)
- Prince Edward Island Route 263
- Quebec Route 263
- Saskatchewan Highway 263

== Japan ==
- Japan National Route 263

== United Kingdom ==
- A263 road
- B263 road

== United States ==
- Alabama State Route 263
- Arkansas Highway 263
- California State Route 263
- Connecticut Route 263
- Florida State Road 263
- Georgia State Route 263 (former)
- Indiana State Road 263
- Kentucky Route 263
- Maryland Route 263
- Minnesota State Highway 263
- Montana Secondary Highway 263
- New Mexico State Road 263
- New York State Route 263
- Pennsylvania Route 263
- South Carolina Highway 263
- Tennessee State Route 263
- Texas State Highway 263 (former)
- Texas State Highway Spur 263
  - Farm to Market Road 263 (Texas)
- Utah State Route 263 (former)
- Virginia State Route 263
- Washington State Route 263

Preceded by 262	Lists of highways 263	Succeeded by 264
