= List of highways numbered 264 =

Route 264 or Highway 264 may refer to:

== Canada ==
- Manitoba Provincial Road 264
- Prince Edward Island Route 264
- Saskatchewan Highway 264

== Israel ==
- Route 264 (Israel)

== Japan ==
- Japan National Route 264

== United Kingdom ==
- A264 road
- B264 road

== United States ==
- Interstate 264 (multiple highways)
- U.S. Route 264
- Arizona State Route 264
- Arkansas Highway 264
- Georgia State Route 264
- Indiana State Road 264
- K-264 (Kansas highway)
- Maryland Route 264
- Minnesota State Highway 264
- Montana Secondary Highway 264
- Nevada State Route 264
- New Mexico State Road 264
- New York State Route 264
- Ohio State Route 264
- Pennsylvania Route 264 (former)
- South Dakota Highway 264 (former)
- Tennessee State Route 264
- Texas State Highway 264 (former)
  - Texas State Highway Spur 264
  - Farm to Market Road 264 (Texas)
- Utah State Route 264
- Virginia State Route 264

Preceded by 263	Lists of highways 264	Succeeded by 265
