= List of highways numbered 265 =

The following highways are numbered 265:

== Canada ==
- Manitoba Provincial Road 265
- New Brunswick Route 265
- Prince Edward Island Route 265
- Quebec Route 265
- Saskatchewan Highway 265

== Japan ==
- Japan National Route 265

== United Kingdom ==
- B265 road
- A265 road

== United States ==
- Interstate 265
- Alabama State Route 265
- Arkansas Highway 265
  - Arkansas Highway 265 Spur
- California State Route 265
- Colorado State Highway 265
- Florida State Road 265
- Georgia State Route 265 (former)
- Indiana State Road 265
- Maryland Route 265
- Missouri Route 265
- Nevada State Route 265
- New Mexico State Road 265
- New York State Route 265
- Ohio State Route 265
- South Carolina Highway 265
- Tennessee State Route 265
- Texas State Highway 265 (former)
  - Texas State Highway Loop 265
  - Farm to Market Road 265 (Texas)
- Utah State Route 265

Preceded by 264	Lists of highways 265	Succeeded by 266
