= List of highways numbered 262 =

The following highways are numbered 262:

== Brazil ==
- BR-262

== Canada ==
- Manitoba Provincial Road 262
- Prince Edward Island Route 262

== Cuba ==
- Road to Herradura (1–262)

== Japan ==
- Japan National Route 262

== United Kingdom ==
- B262 road
- A262 road

== United States ==
- U.S. Route 262 (former proposal)
- Arkansas Highway 262
- California State Route 262
- Connecticut Route 262
- Georgia State Route 262
- Indiana State Road 262
- Kentucky Route 262
- Maryland Route 262
- Minnesota State Highway 262
- Montana Secondary Highway 262
- New Mexico State Road 262
- New York State Route 262
- Pennsylvania Route 262
- South Carolina Highway 262
- South Dakota Highway 262
- Tennessee State Route 262
- Texas State Highway 262 (former)
  - Texas State Highway Loop 262
  - Farm to Market Road 262 (Texas)
- Utah State Route 262
- Virginia State Route 262
- Washington State Route 262

Preceded by 261	Lists of highways 262	Succeeded by 263
