= List of highways numbered 261 =

The following highways are numbered 261:

== Asia ==
=== Japan ===
- Japan National Route 261

=== Malaysia ===
- Malaysia Federal Route 261

== Europe ==
=== Germany ===
- Bundesautobahn 261

=== Norway ===
- Norwegian County Road 261

=== Poland ===
- European route E261

=== United Kingdom ===
- A261 road
- B261 road

== North America ==
=== Canada ===
- Prince Edward Island Route 261
- Quebec Route 261

=== Mexico ===
- Mexican Federal Highway 261

=== United States ===
- Alabama State Route 261
- Arizona State Route 261
- California State Route 261
- Delaware Route 261
- Florida State Road 261
- Georgia State Route 261 (former)
- Indiana State Road 261
- Kansas state highway spur K-261
- Kentucky Route 261
- Maryland Route 261
- Minnesota State Highway 261
- New Mexico State Road 261
- New York State Route 261
  - County Route 261 in Erie County
- North Carolina Highway 261
- Ohio State Route 261
- Oregon Route 238
- Pennsylvania Route 261
- South Carolina Highway 261
- Tennessee State Route 261
- Texas State Highway 261
  - Texas State Highway Spur 261
  - Farm to Market Road 261
- Utah State Route 261
- Virginia State Route 261
- Washington State Route 261

== South America ==
=== Brazil ===
- SP-261

== See also ==
- Milwaukee Road 261, a steam locomotive

| Preceded by 260 | Lists of highways 261 | Succeeded by 262 |
