= Hagi Ōkan Highway =

Hagi Ōkan

Route information
- Established by Chōshū Domain
- Length: 52.7 km (32.7 mi)
- Time period: Edo

Major junctions
- North end: Hagi, Yamaguchi
- San'yōdō
- South end: Hōfu, Yamaguchi

Location
- Country: Japan

Highway system
- National highways of Japan; Expressways of Japan
- National Historic Site of Japan

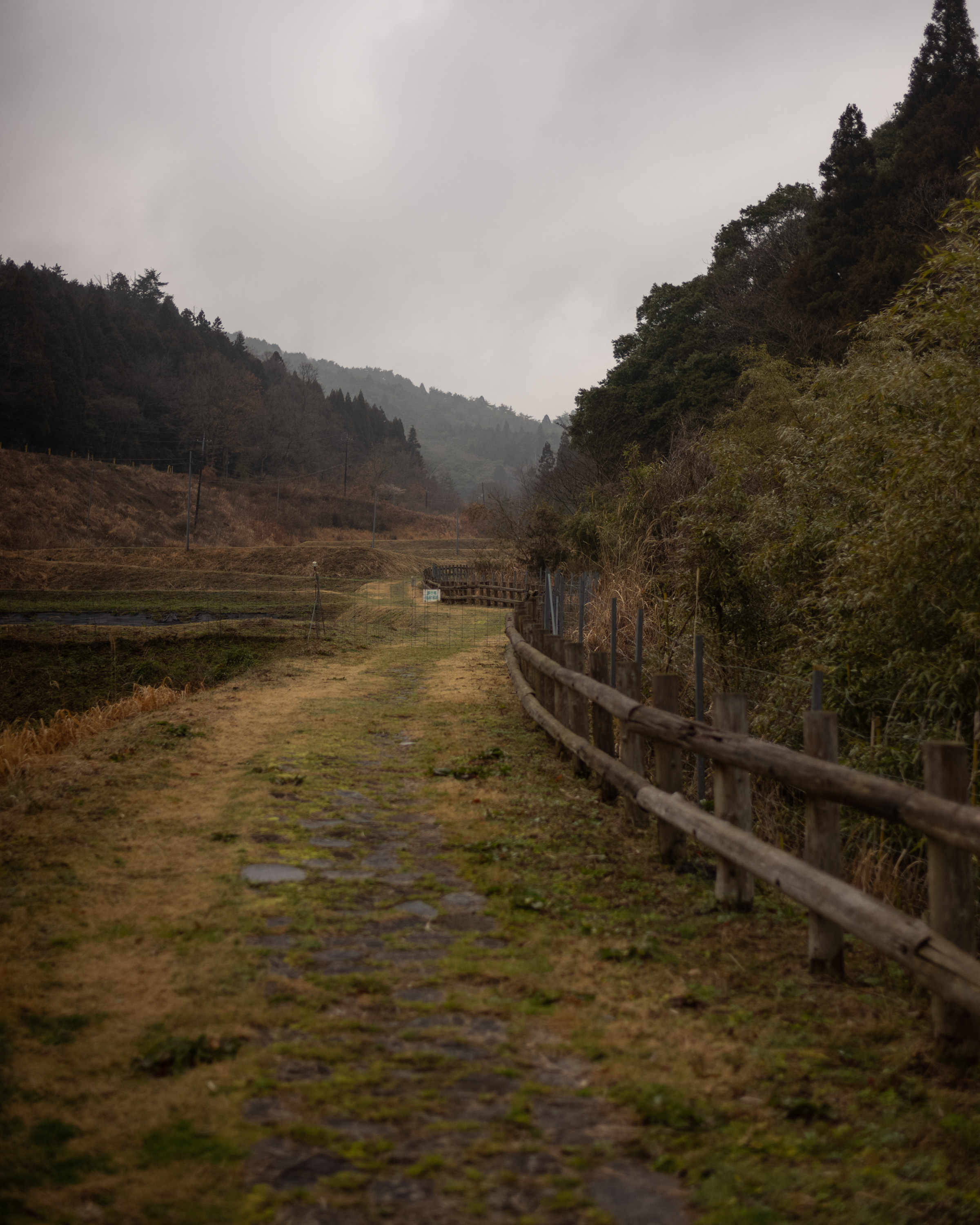
The Hagi Ōkan path near Sasanami Village

The Hagi Ōkan (萩往還) was a kaidō (pre-modern) Japanese highway completed in the Edo period (1603–1868). It is 52.7 kilometers in length and extends from the castle town of Hagi (萩市), capital of Nagato Province to Mitajiri of Suō Province (today's Hōfu). Hagi is on the Sea of Japan and the route crosses the Chugoku Mountain Range to aa port on the Seto Inland Sea, almost in a straight line. Approximately 9.2 kilometers of the surviving portion were designated a National Historic Site in 1989.

== Summary ==
Parts of the Hagi Ōkan existed before the Edo Period, but in 1604, after the Battle of Sekigahara in 1600, the powerful Mōri clan, which had controlled the Chugoku region of western Japan, was reduced to the provinces of Nagato and Suō, and was forced to relocate its primary stronghold to Hagi. They subsequently renovated the existing pathway into a four-metre-wide cobblestone pats, with rest stops, milestones, and pine trees along the route. A signboard in Karahi Town in central Hagi is the start of the highway. It passes through the post-towns of Akaragi, Sasanami, Yamaguchi, and Mitajiri in what is now the cities of Hagi, Yamaguchi and Hōfu. It was a major access way from Hagi to the main Saigoku Highway (San'yōdō Highway). The daimyō of Chōshū Domain used it to travel to Edo for his sankin kōtai duties to his respects to the Shogun. It was also a major trade link from Hagi on the Sea of Japan to Nakanoseki Port (Mitajiri) on the Inland Sea .

During the Bakumatsu period, it was famously used by anti-Shogunate forces in the Boshin War which toppled the shogunate. After the Meiji Restoration (1868) the highway fell into disuse. Some of the steeper mountain sections were abandoned.

== Today ==
Today much of the old Hagi Ōkan has been built over by the modern Japan National Route 262 (the section between Yamaguchi and Sasanami is Yamaguchi Prefectural Highway 62). This modern highway is an important link between Hagi, Yamaguchi and Hōfu. Parts of the old road around Akaragi and Sasanami remain in the original state or have been rebuilt in the original state. A program to restore these sections began in 1977. In 1989 the full length of the Highway and its related historical places was given Heritage Listing.

In 1996, the highway was listed as one of the "100 Historical Highways of Japan" by the Agency for Cultural Affairs. In 2004, the section from Hagi to Yamaguchi was listed as one of the "500 Roads to Walk in Japan", and in 2007, it was listed as one of the "Beautiful Japanese Highways".

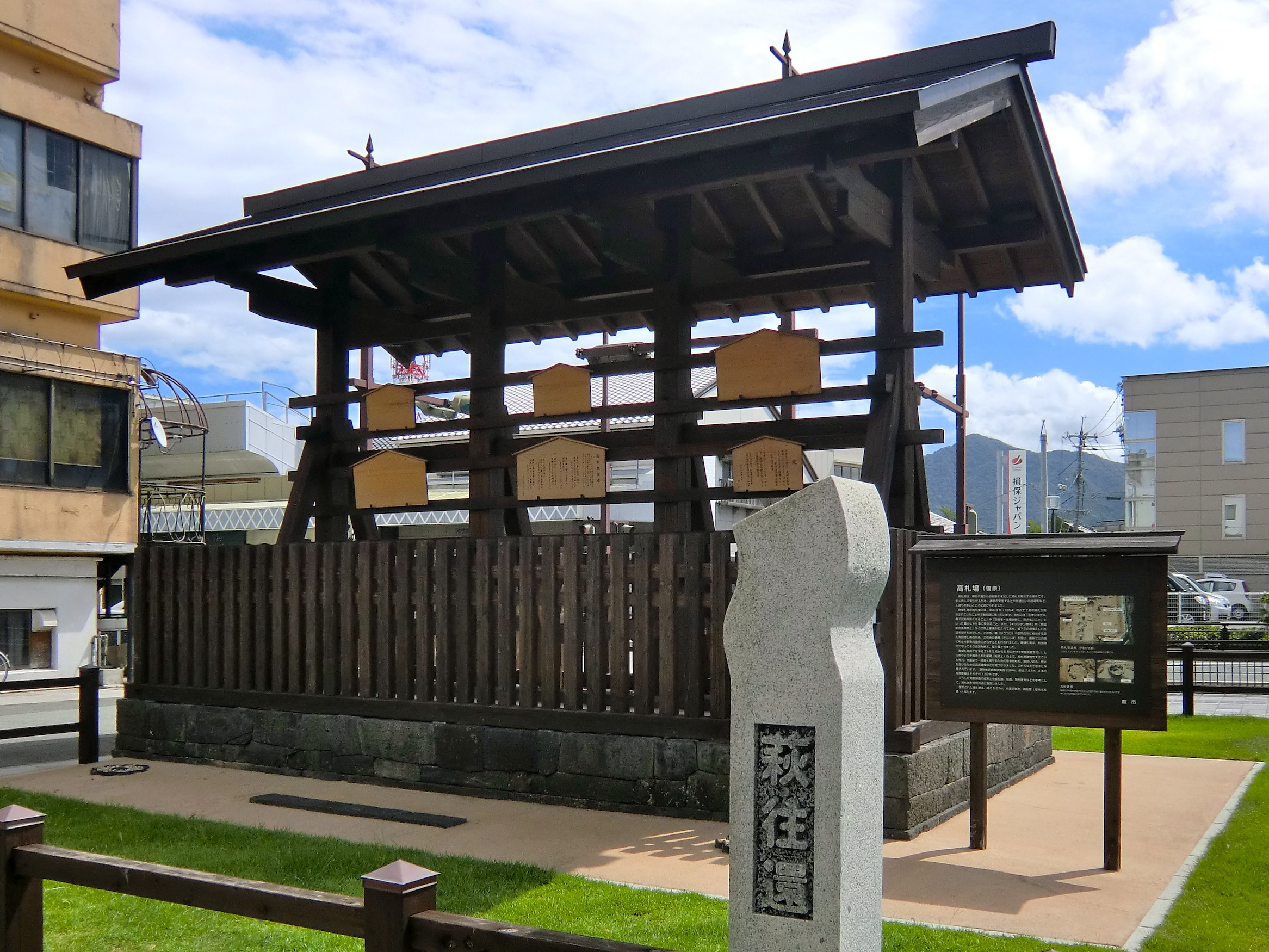
Starting point of Hagi Ōkan

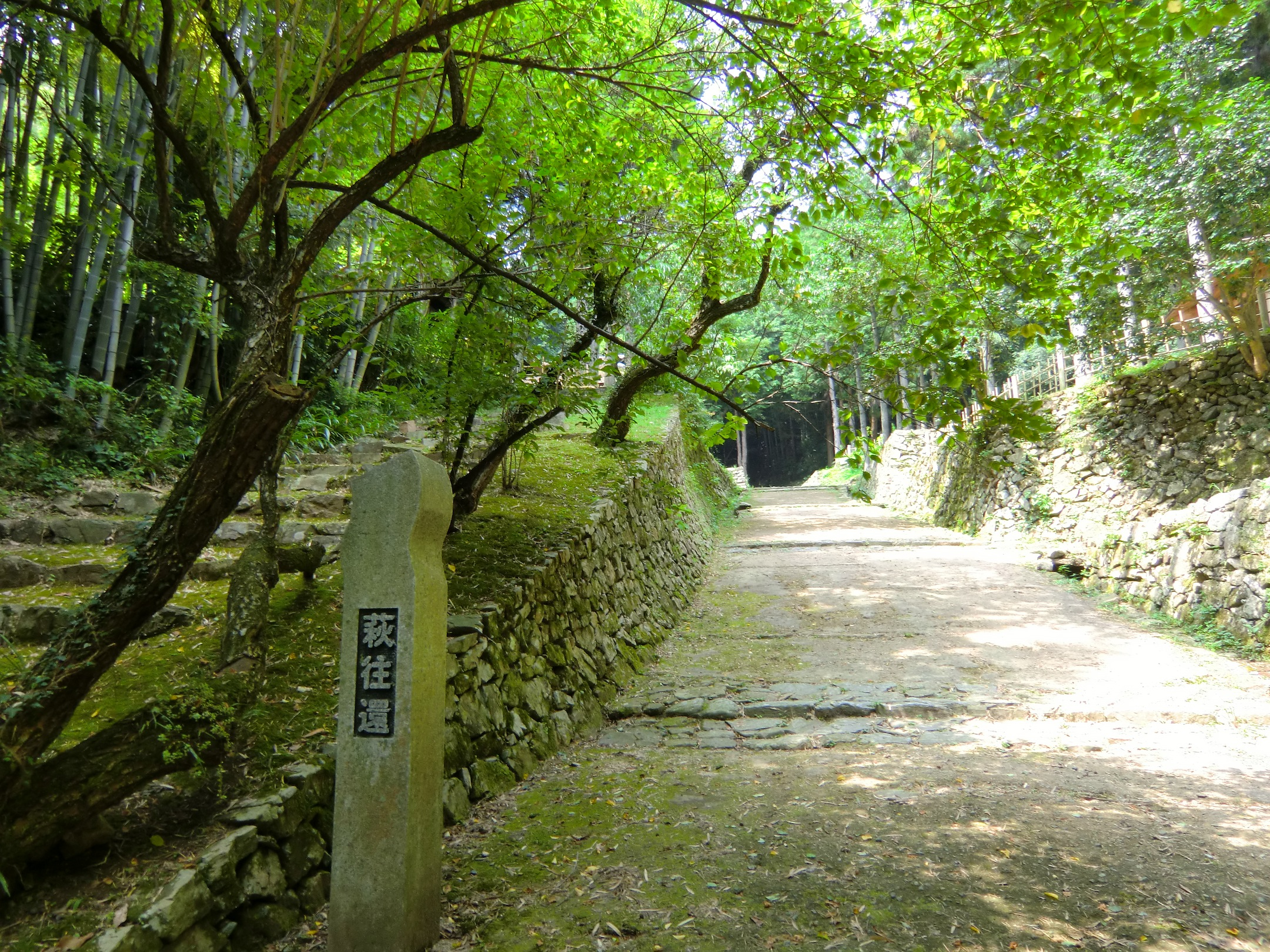
Hagi Ōkan in Yamaguchi

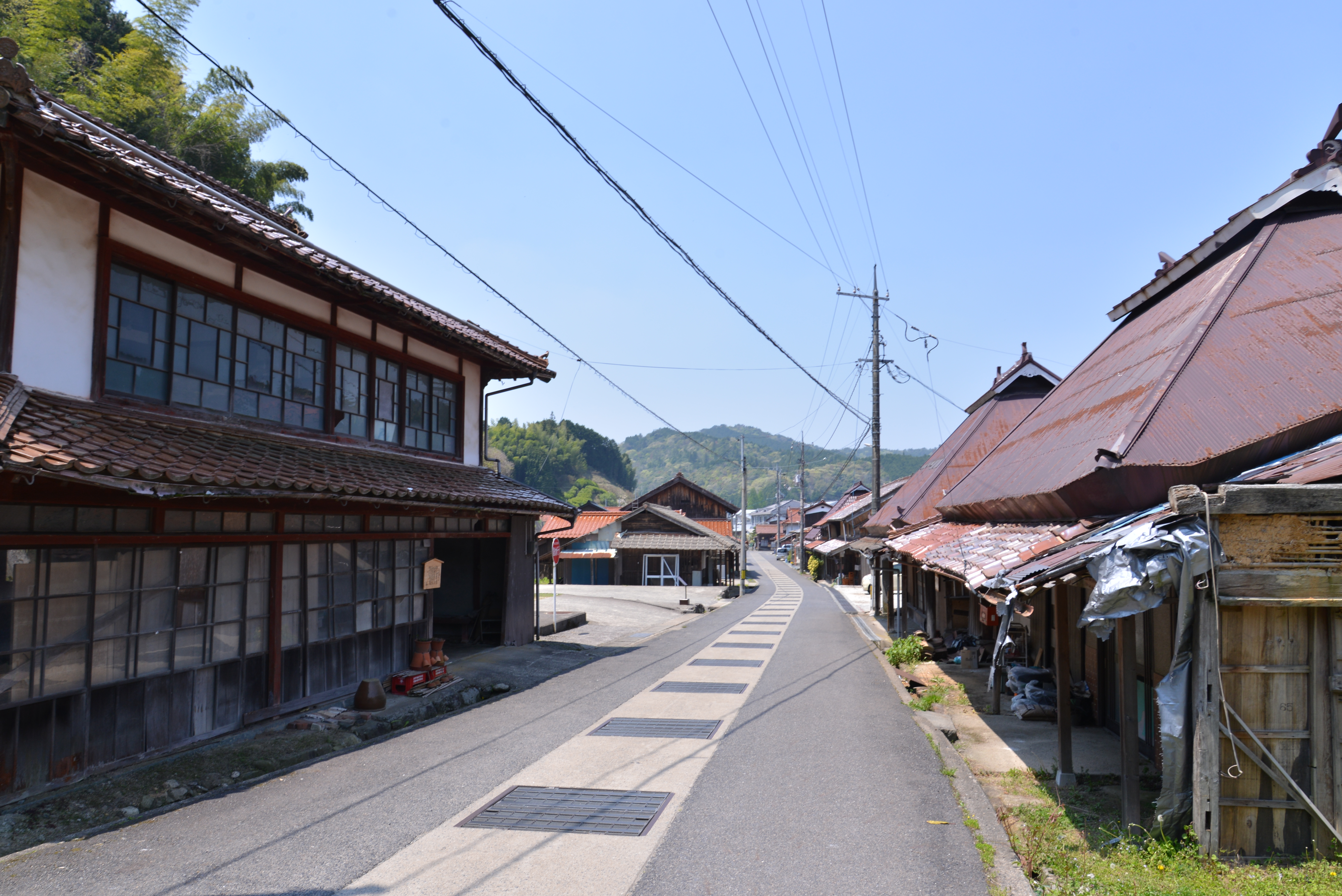
Hagi Ōkan Sasanami street

== Related Historical Sites ==
=== Hagi City ===
- Karahi Town Notice Board: located in central Hagi, it is the start of the Hagi Ōkan. This type of notice board was located at the entrance to Post-towns and was the main method for the samurai to communicate laws and notifications to the commoners. Karahi's notice board was dismantled in the early Meiji Restoration but in 2010 a large-scale replica was constructed.
- Namida-Matsu (Weeping Pine Trees): Pine trees lined the entire length of the Highway, placed every four metres. "Namida-Matsu" refer to a group of pines lining the highway at the entrance to Hagi. Departing Hagi travellers would weep with sadness for leaving Hagi, and on return would weep for joy. A poem monument by Yoshida Shōin relates to his being sent to Edo after the Ansei Rebellion. Yoshida was one of the great intellectuals of the late Edo Period who instructed many of the young warriors who would eventually take on important roles in the new Meiji government.
- Kasega-saka Ichirizuka Distance Mound: the first distance mound (approximately 4 km) from the Karahi Notice Board.
- Issho-Dani Valley Ishi-Datami (stone paving): built in a steep valley where rain would often wash away the road. The cobblestones were laid down through the valley to protect the road. A small section 38m long and 1m wide remains. The name of the valley comes from the fact that to climb the valley would take the time taken to eat 1.8 kg (Issho) of fried beans. The original section of "Ishi-Datami" is 1 metre wide. The border stones are straight-edged and arranged evenly while the filler stones are very irregular.
- Ochiai Stone Bridge: This bridge is located at the mid-way point of the highway and crosses the Ochiai River, a major tributary to the Sasanami River. It is 2.4m long and 1.7m wide. It is of "Hanebashi" construction (a Japanese bridge construction method unique to Edo period Japan). It is a registered heritage structure. "Hanebashi" have a supporting stone stuck into the side of the river bank and weighted down these stones provide the base for the bridge strone.

=== Yamaguchi City ===
Eight Prime Ministers have come from Yamaguchi, including Japan's first, Itō Hirobumi who was Prime Minister four times. Of the eight, five were Prime Minister during the Meiji Era. The former prime minister, Shinzo Abe, who was 90th, 96th, 97th and 98th Prime Minister was also from Yamaguchi.

- Provincial Border Marker: A granite pillar marks the border of Nagato Province Abu-gun and Suō Province Yoshiki-gun. The pillar was carved in 1808 but existed since at least a mapping survey completed in the 1750s.
- Rokken Chaya Remains (the remains of the six tea houses): Today's buildings are a recreation of the Daimyō's Resting Place. They sit at the top of Ichi-no-Saka Hill or "the toughest hill in Yamaguchi". It is one is the most difficult climbs on the Hagi Ōukan and comes at the top of the "42 switchbacks". It was the location of the "Daimyō's Palanquin Resting Place" and the recreation includes two sand pits where the Daimyō's Palanquin and its backup would have rested. A raised sitting area is where the daimyō rested. The current recreation has relied on a diagram of the area from the Edo Period.
- Naganobori Copper Mine: The mine was first opened in the Nara Period (8th century) to supply copper for the construction of the Great Buddha at Nara. It took 20 days to transport the copper from the mine to the local port and across the Inland Sea to Nara.

=== Hofu City ===
- Koube Family Miyaichi Honjin: The Miyaichi Honjin was an inn which acted as the honjin from 1642 until Meiji period. Daimyō from all over the West of Japan would use this inn. It was available to high-ranked Shogunate officials. It was designated a Cultural Heritage site associated with the Hagi Ōkan in 1989. In 2012 the front gate and garden were added to the cultural register. The building was first constructed by the Koube Family, a wealthy trading family, and reconstructed after its destruction by "The Great Fire of 1789". The building was lost again to fire in 2011. Archaeological excavation is being conducted and while this is proceeding only the front gate is viewable.
- Mitajiri Tea House Remains: The tea house was built by Mōri Tsunahiro. It was used for official Provincial work such as annual attendance to Edo and inspection tours of the province. The daimyō travelling on the Hagi Ōkan would board a ship at this point and so it is formally the terminus of the Hagi Ōkan. It was registered as a Hagi Ōkan related cultural heritage in 1989.
- Hagi Domain Boat Shed The Mōri Navy had been very active during the Warring States Period and in 1611 settled here in its new form as shipping services for Chōshū Domain. The facility included docks for storing, repairing and building ships. All of the facilities were abandoned in the Meiji era and all that remains are some channel and dock stone walls.

== See also ==
- List of Historic Sites of Japan (Yamaguchi)
