= List of highways numbered 267 =

The following highways are numbered 267:

== Canada ==
- Manitoba Provincial Road 267
- Prince Edward Island Route 267
- Quebec Route 267

== Ireland ==
- R267 regional road

== Japan ==
- Japan National Route 267

== United Kingdom ==
- A267 road
- B267 road

== United States ==
- Alabama State Route 267
- Arkansas Highway 267
  - Arkansas Highway 267 Spur
- California State Route 267
- Florida State Road 267
- Georgia State Route 267 (former)
- Illinois Route 267
- Indiana State Road 267
- K-267 (Kansas highway)
- Kentucky Route 267
- Maryland Route 267
- Minnesota State Highway 267
- Missouri Route 267
- Nevada State Route 267
- New Mexico State Road 267
- New York State Route 267 (former)
- Ohio State Route 267
- Pennsylvania Route 267
- South Carolina Highway 267
- Tennessee State Route 267
- Texas State Highway 267 (former)
  - Farm to Market Road 267 (Texas)
- Utah State Route 267 (former)
- Virginia State Route 267

Preceded by 266	Lists of highways 267	Succeeded by 268
