= Alabama State Route 147 =

State highway in Alabama, United States

State Route 147

Route information
- Maintained by ALDOT
- Length: 16.9 mi (27.2 km)

Major junctions
- South end: I-85 / US 29 in Auburn
- US 280 near Auburn
- North end: US 431 in Oak Bowery

Location
- Country: United States
- State: Alabama
- Counties: Lee, Chambers

Highway system
- Alabama State Highway System; Interstate; US; State
← SR 146	→ SR 148

State Route 147 (SR 147) is a 16.9-mile (27.2 km) state highway maintained by the U.S. state of Alabama in the east-central part of Alabama. The highway acts as a connector between Interstate 85 (I-85) and U.S. Route 29 (US 29) in the southern part of Auburn and US 431 between Auburn and LaFayette.

== Route description ==
SR 147 lies mostly within the city limits of Auburn. Approximately 1 mile (1.6 km) of the road travels through unincorporated Lee County, while 4.2 miles (6.8 km) lies in rural Chambers County.

SR 147 begins on College Street in Auburn at its junction with Interstate 85 at Exit 51 and US 29. Whereas it once entered downtown Auburn, it now bypasses the city on its western and northern side on Shug Jordan Parkway. At its intersection with College Street, the route turns north. It continues along Birmingham’s Highway and US 280 (internally designated as SR 38) to mile 9.0, then continues on Heath Road in northern Auburn.

== History ==
In 1939, the state of Alabama constructed the original segment of SR 147, connecting US 29 in downtown Auburn to what was then US 241 (now US 280) at The Bottle. In 1947, SR 147 was extended north 3 miles (4.8 km) to Gold Hill. The final extension from Gold Hill to US 431 to complete the northern portion of the highway did not occur until 1960. In 1998, the relocation of US 29 to I-85 led to the movement of the southern terminus of the highway from the intersection of Mitchum Avenue and College Street in downtown Auburn to a point 4 miles (6.4 km) south at the College Street interchange with I-85.

In 2006, the Alabama Department of Transportation began a relocation study for the southern half of SR 147. The study is to look at the possibility of rerouting the highway some 4 miles (6.4 km) west of Auburn, along the route of the proposed Auburn Outer Loop. The proposed relocation would begin at I-85 at the under-development Cox Road interchange (exit 50) and would travel north 13 miles (21 km) to connect with US 280 at mile marker 101.4, where it would join the current northern section of SR 147.

SR 267 was a bypass of SR 147. The designation of SR 267 has been removed from the state highway system. SR 147 now follows that alignment.

SR 147 has been relocated along Shug Jordan Parkway by the Alabama Department of Transportation. The highway no longer follows South College Street into downtown Auburn. When Shug Jordan Pkwy ends at North College Street, the highway turns to follow along North College Street to the area of north Auburn known as The Bottle at US 280. Then, it follows its previous alignment through Gold Hill to its terminus at US 431 in Oak Bowery, north of Opelika.

== Major intersections ==
County	Location	mi	km	Destinations	Notes
Lee	Auburn	0.0	0.0	I-85 / US 29 (SR 15) – Montgomery, Atlanta	Southern terminus; I-85 exit 51
Lee	Auburn	3.9– 4.0	6.3– 6.4	SR 14 west – Loachapoka, Notasulga, Tallassee	Eastern terminus of SR 14; interchange
Lee	Auburn	8.6– 9.0	13.8– 14.5	US 280 (SR 38) – Opelika, Waverly, Camp Hill	Short concurrency with US 280/SR 38
Chambers		16.9	27.2	US 431 (SR 1) – Opelika, La Fayette	Northern terminus
1.000 mi = 1.609 km; 1.000 km = 0.621 mi
