= Ulnes Bridge =

Road bridge in Norway

Ulnes Bridge Ulnes bru
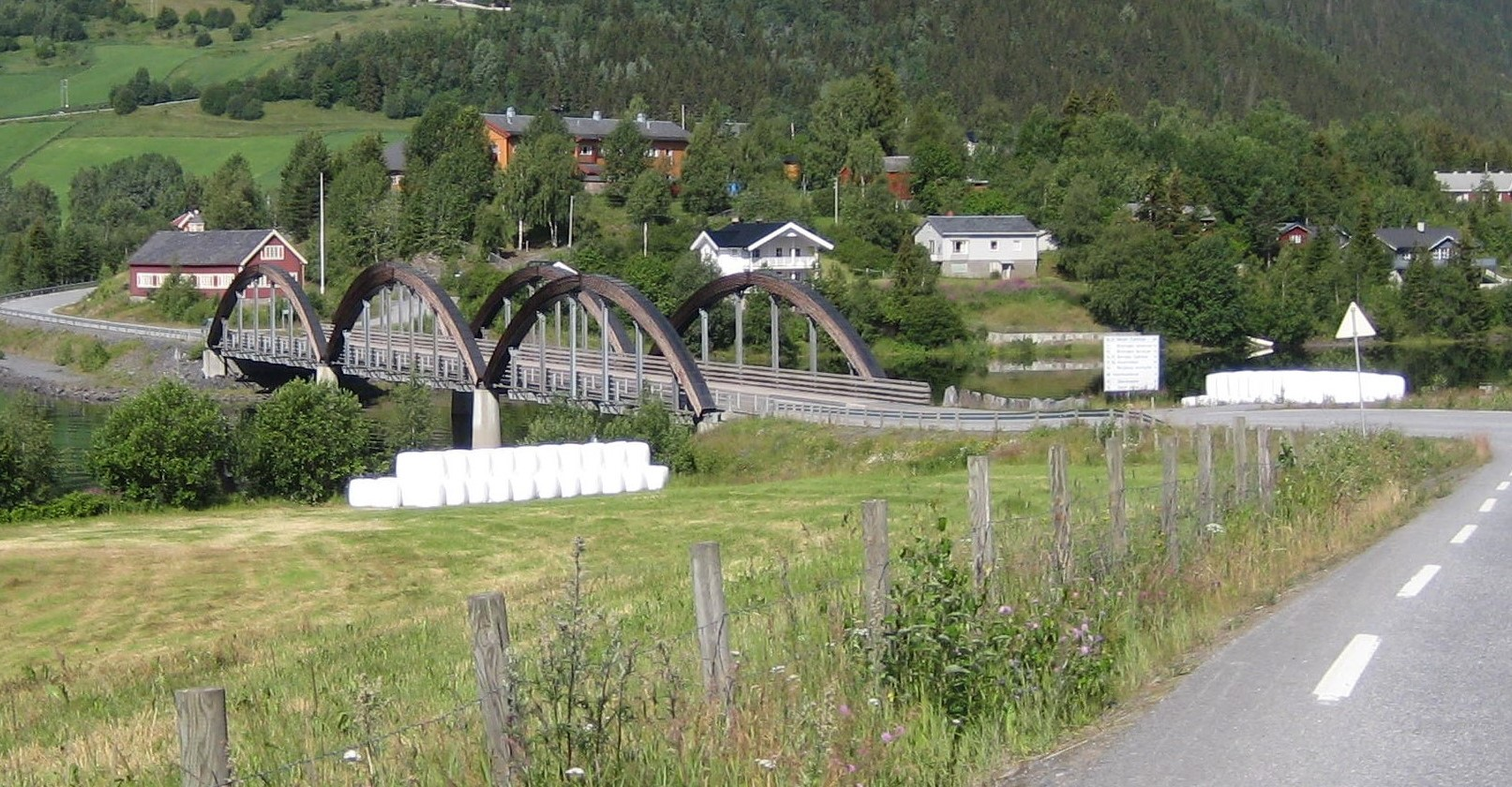
- View of the Ulnes Bridge, seen from the southeast
- Coordinates: 60°59′55″N 9°06′24″E
- Carries: Norwegian County Road 261
- Crosses: Strondafjorden
- Locale: Nord-Aurdal Municipality

Characteristics
- Material: Wooden
- Total length: 105 metres (344 ft)
- Longest span: 35 metres (115 ft)
- No. of spans: 3

History
- Opened: 20 June 2003

Location
- Interactive map of Ulnes Bridge

The Ulnes Bridge (Norwegian: Ulnes bru) is a road bridge in Nord-Aurdal Municipality in Innlandet county, Norway. The bridge crosses the Strondafjorden at Ulnes, just northwest of Ulnes Church. The bridge is a branch of Norwegian County Road 261 connecting it to European route E16. The bridge was opened on 20 June 2003. It is a wooden bridge with three spans of 35 meters (115 ft) each, creating a total length of 105 meters (344 ft). The new wooden bridge replaced an older concrete bridge from 1932 that was narrow and in poor condition.

== See also ==
- List of bridges in Norway
