= Gold Hill, Alabama =

Unincorporated community in Alabama, United States

- Unincorporated community
- Location within Alabama Location within the United States
- Coordinates: 32°43′18″N 85°30′28″W
- Country: United States
- State: Alabama
- County: Lee
- Elevation: 735 ft (224 m)
- Time zone: UTC-6 (CST)
  - Summer (DST): UTC-6 (EDT)
- GNIS feature ID: 119087

Gold Hill, also known as Goldhill, Gold Mine, or Gold Ridge, is an unincorporated community north-centrally located in Lee County, Alabama, United States, just a few hundred feet south of the Chambers County line. It is part of the Columbus, Georgia-Alabama Metropolitan Area. Today, Gold Hill lies mostly in the corporate limits of Auburn.

== History ==
Gold Hill was settled in the 1830s, and—despite being in the southern reaches of the territory mined for gold in the 1840s Alabama Gold Rush—was not named for the mineral, but rather for an early settler named Goldsmith. In the 1870s, Gold Hill received a second name, Gold Ridge, after confusion between the railroad stops at Gold Hill and nearby Camp Hill led the postal administration to rename the Gold Hill post office. Despite being "officially" considered Gold Ridge by the United States Postal Service and the railroad, residents have always considered the community to be only Gold Hill.

Gold Hill is also the location of "Roamer's Roost", the home of epilepsy scientist William P. Spratling and his son, silversmith William Spratling.

A post office operated under the name Gold Hill from 1837 to 1967.

== The Old Barn ==
There was an old barn in Gold Hill which stood for 140 years. It was located adjacent to the railroad crossing on Alabama State Route 147. The building was erected in 1870 and served as the community's general store. During most of its history, the barn which housed the general store was connected to about 4,200 acres (17 km^{2}) of farmland. The store, and the farms that surrounded it operated much in the same way all the way up until the 1940s. Following The Great Migration, many of the field laborers left the area to begin new lives in northern cities such as Detroit and Buffalo. This left the community a shell of its former self. Eventually, the store closed down and the mail trains didn't make stops in "Gold Ridge" anymore (to this day, the mail is still delivered to the community from the post office in Waverly, Alabama). Despite this, the barn stood as Gold Hill's most recognizable landmark until it was torn down in 2010.

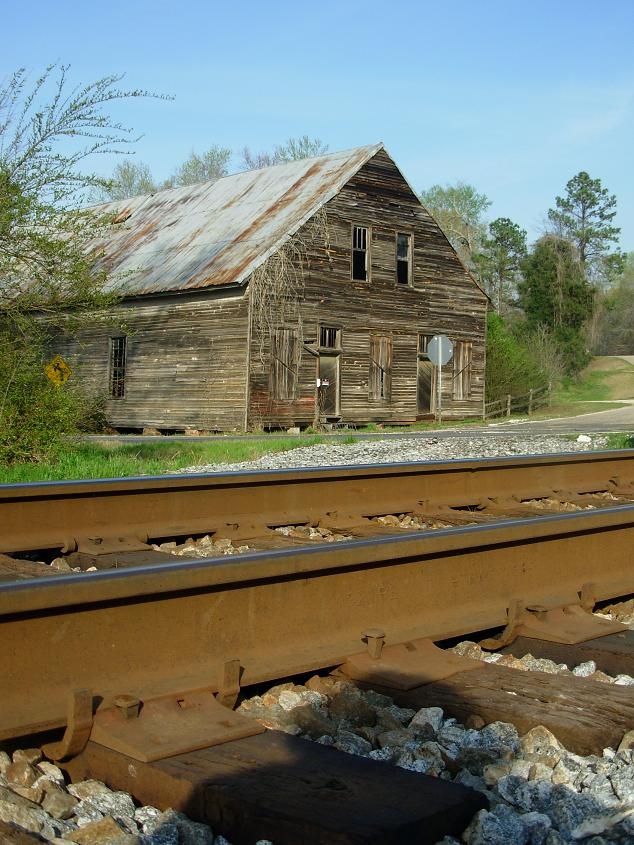
The old barn near the railroad crossing was, perhaps, Gold Hill, Alabama's most recognizable landmark until it was torn down in 2010.

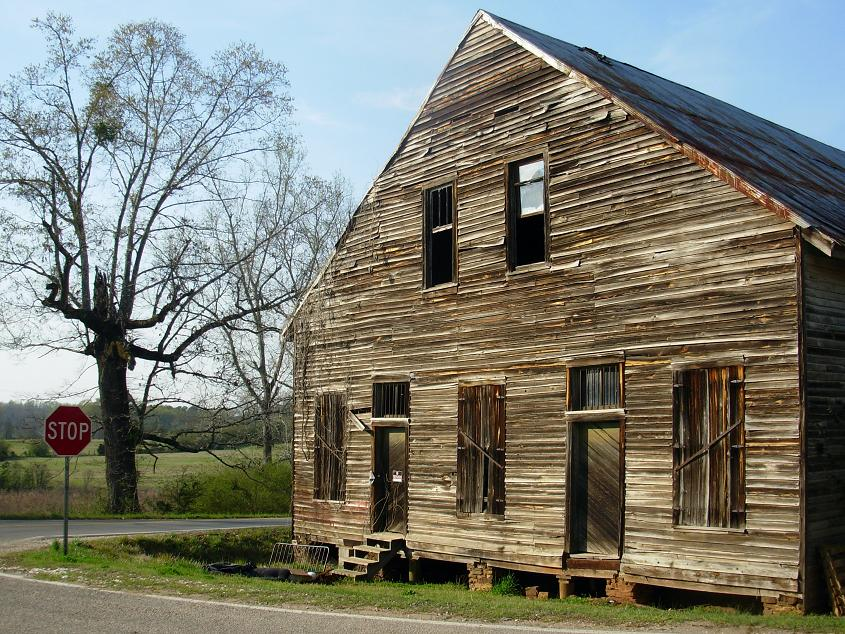
The old barn from another angle.

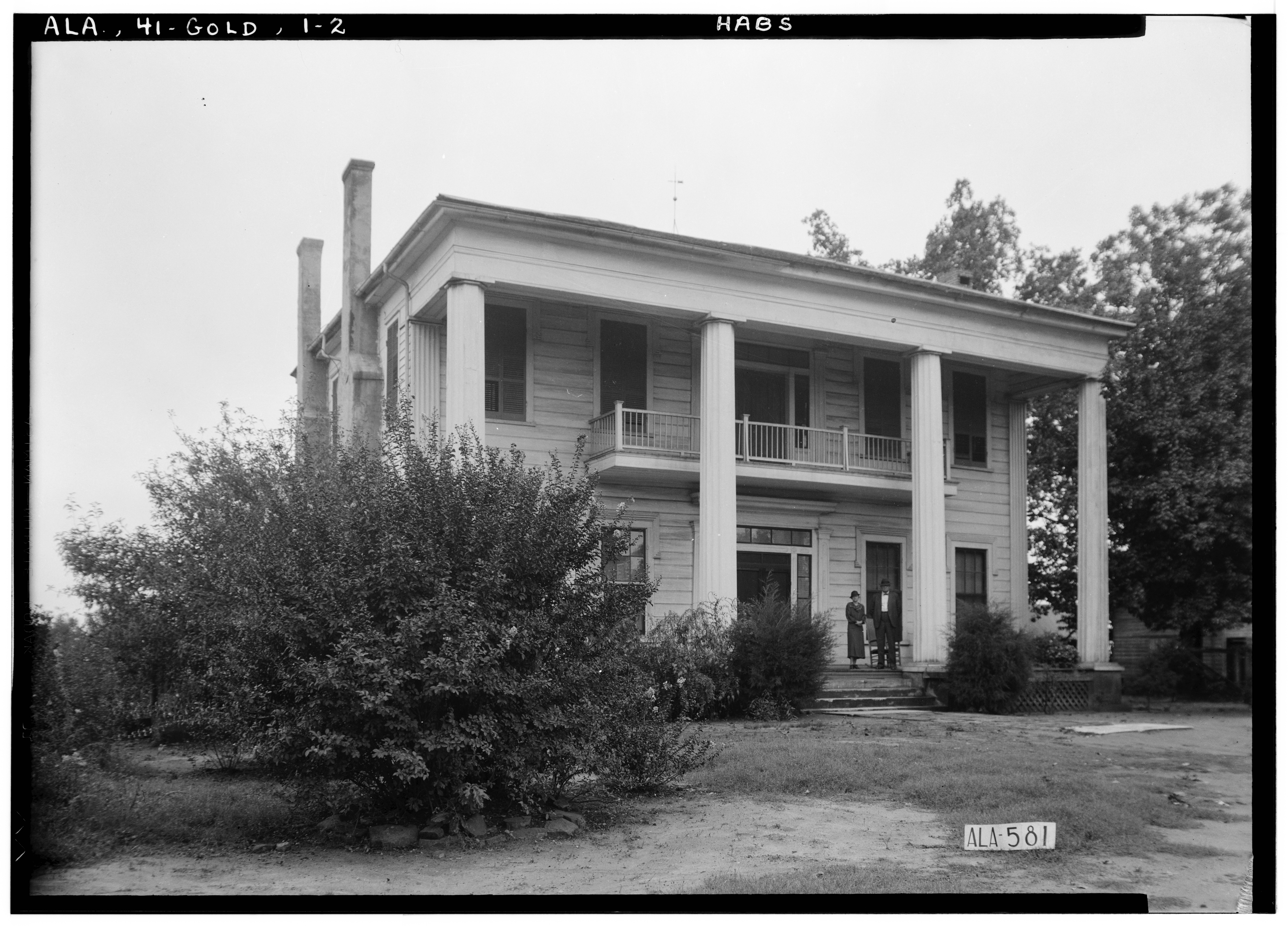
The historic James Ellington House is located in Gold Hill.

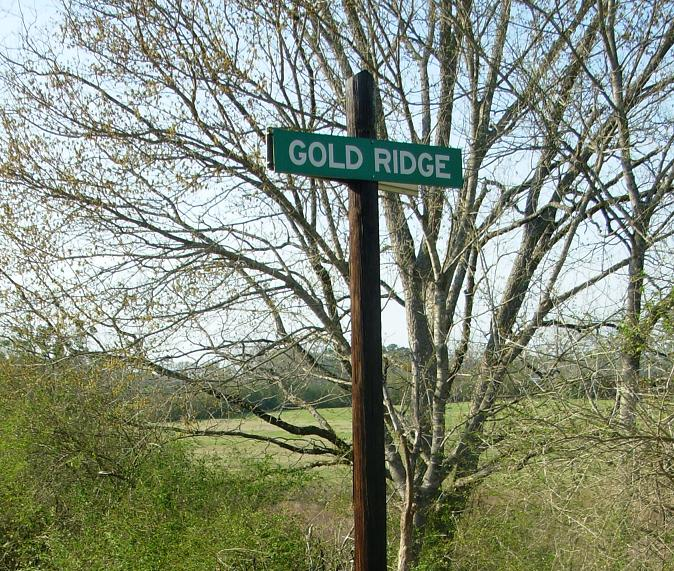
Gold Hill received a second name, "Gold Ridge", after confusion between the railroad stops at Gold Hill and nearby Camp Hill.

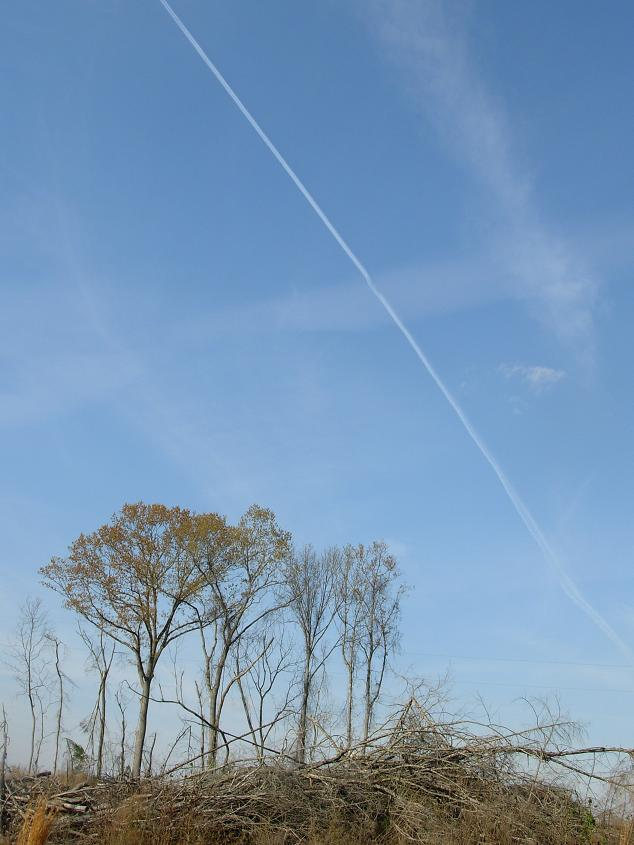
Trees and sky in Gold Hill, Alabama.
