= Norwegian County Road 261 =

Road in Norway

County Road 261

Route information
- Length: 36.3 km (22.6 mi)

Major junctions
- West end: E16 Hålimo
- Fv295 at Åstadvollen; E16 at Nesja; Fv294 at Øde; E16 at Røn; Fv265 at Ulnes; Fv267 at Steinde
- East end: Rv51 at Håde

Location
- Country: Norway
- Counties: Innlandet

Highway system
- Roads in Norway; National Roads; County Roads

County Road 261 (Norwegian: Fylkesvei 261) is a 36.3-kilometer (22.6 mi) road in Innlandet County, Norway. It runs from Hålimo in Vang Municipality to Håde in Nord-Aurdal Municipality, passing through Vestre Slidre Municipality. The road follows the west sides of the Slidre Fjord and Stronda Fjord, and spurs of the road cross the two lakes at the Einang Sound Bridge and the Ulnes Bridge. Cultural heritage sites along the route include the Mo Church Ruins.

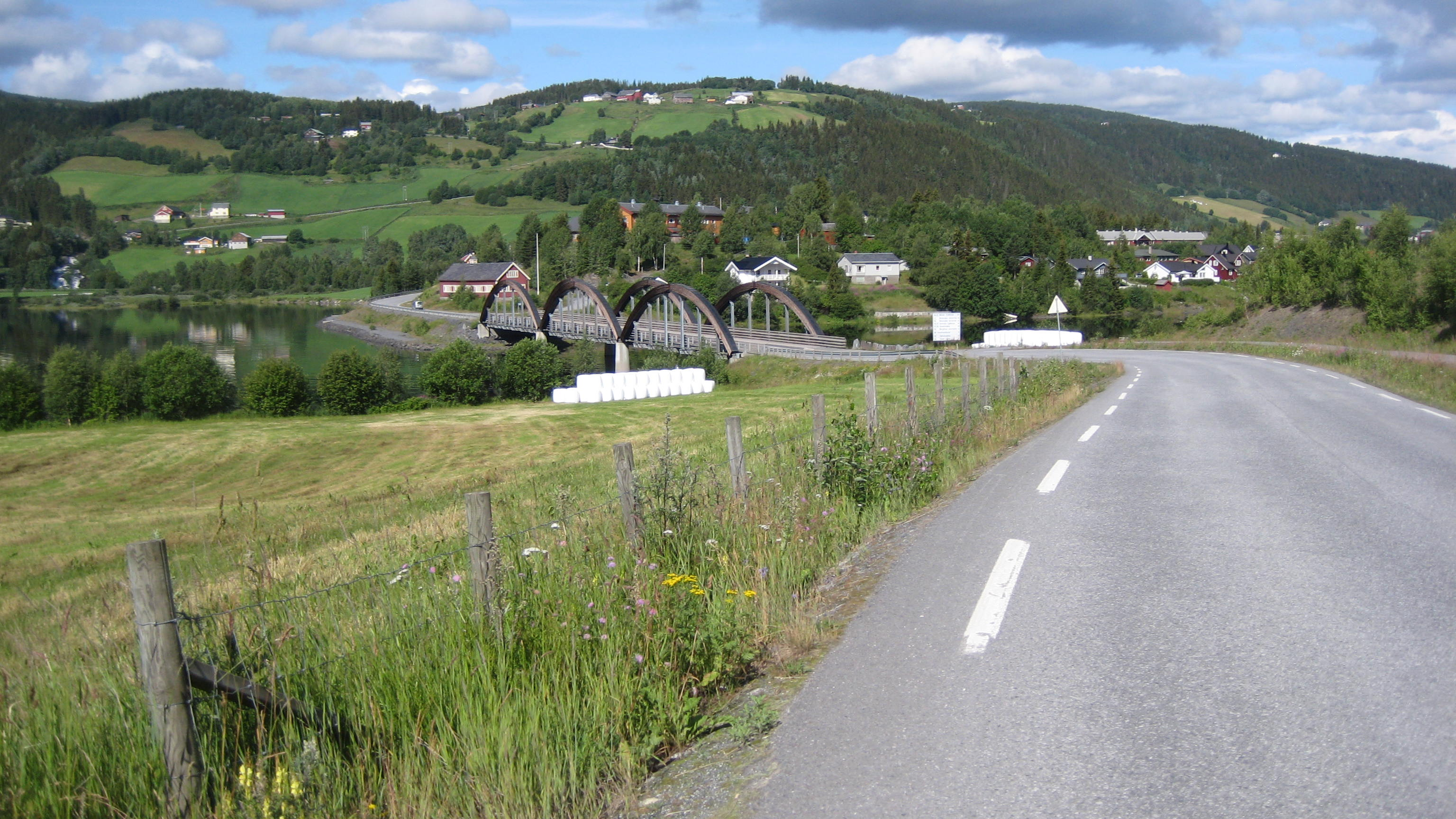
County Road 261 crossing the Ulnes Bridge
