= List of highways numbered 266 =

The following highways are numbered 266:

== Canada ==
- Manitoba Provincial Road 266
- Prince Edward Island Route 266

== Japan ==
- Japan National Route 266

== United Kingdom ==
- A266 road
- B266 road

== United States ==
- Interstate 266 (unbuilt)
- U.S. Route 266
- Arizona State Route 266
- Arkansas Highway 266
- California State Route 266
- Colorado State Highway 266
- Georgia State Route 266
- Indiana State Road 266
- Iowa Highway 266 (former)
- K-266 (Kansas highway)
- Kentucky Route 266
- Minnesota State Highway 266 (former)
- Missouri Route 266
- Nevada State Route 266
- New Mexico State Road 266
- New York State Route 266
- Ohio State Route 266
- Oklahoma State Highway 266
- Pennsylvania Route 266 (former)
- South Carolina Highway 266
- Tennessee State Route 266
- Texas State Highway 266 (former)
  - Texas State Highway Loop 266
  - Farm to Market Road 266 (Texas)
- Utah State Route 266

Preceded by 265	Lists of highways 266	Succeeded by 267
