= Einang Sound Bridge =

Road bridge in Innlandet, Norway

Einang Sound Bridge Einangsundet bru
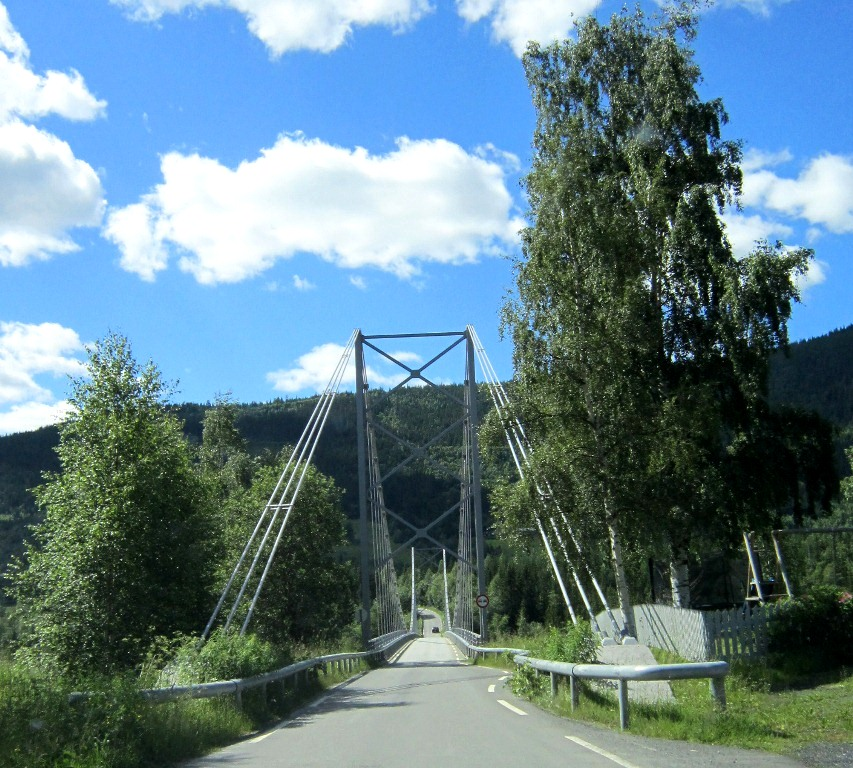
- View of the bridge
- Coordinates: 61°04′22″N 8°59′28″E
- Carries: Norwegian County Road 261
- Crosses: Einangsundet strait
- Locale: Vestre Slidre Municipality

Characteristics
- Total length: 166 metres (545 ft)
- No. of spans: 3

History
- Construction end: 1963

Location
- Interactive map of Einang Sound Bridge

The Einang Sound Bridge (Norwegian: Einangsundet bru) is a road bridge in Vestre Slidre Municipality in Innlandet county, Norway. The bridge crosses the Einang Sound and Slidre Fjord, and it is a branch of Norwegian County Road 261 connecting it to European route E16. The bridge is a suspension bridge with three spans creating a total length of 166 meters (545 ft). The bridge was built in 1963.

== See also ==
- List of bridges in Norway
