= Strondafjorden =

Lake in Innlandet, Norway

- Strandefjorden / Strøndafjorden; Stondafjorden (historic)
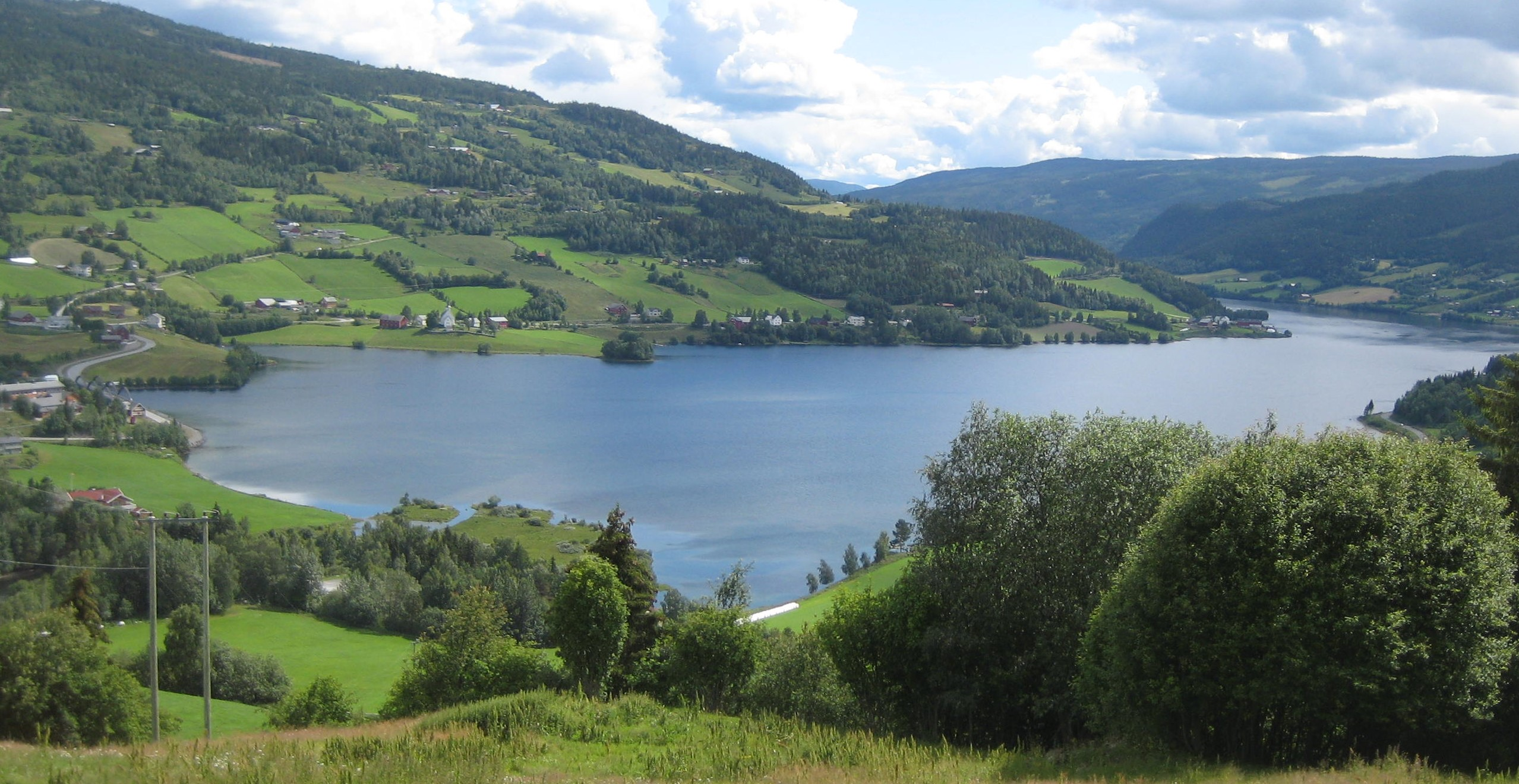
- View of the lake
- Interactive map of the lake
- Location: Valdres, Innlandet
- Coordinates: 60.97192°N 9.17366°E
- Basin countries: Norway
- Max. length: 17 kilometres (11 mi)
- Max. width: 1.2 kilometres (0.75 mi)
- Surface area: 13.4 km^{2} (5.2 sq mi)
- Max. depth: 95 metres (312 ft)
- Shore length^{1}: 46 kilometres (29 mi)
- Surface elevation: 355 metres (1,165 ft)
- References: NVE
- ^{1} Shore length is not a well-defined measure.

Strondafjorden (lit. 'Stronda Fjord') is a lake which lies in Nord-Aurdal Municipality and Vestre Slidre Municipality in the Valdres region of Innlandet county, Norway. The lake is part of the Begna watershed. The 13.4-square-kilometre (5.2 sq mi) lake sits at an elevation of 355 metres (1,165 ft) above sea level and it has a circumference of 46 kilometres (29 mi). The town of Fagernes is located at the southeast end of the lake.

The northwest end of the lake is crossed by the Ulnes Bridge in the village of Røn. The European route E16 highway runs along the north shore of the lake, for its whole length. The Strondafjorden is a reservoir for the Faslefoss hydroelectric power plant. In 1919, a dam was built at the south end of the lake to regulate the lake for power production. At the outlet of the dam, there is the 37-metre (121 ft) tall Faslefoss waterfall.

== See also ==
- List of lakes in Norway
