= Utah State Route 267 =

Utah State Route 267 may refer to:

- Utah State Route 267 (1959-1964)
- Utah State Route 267 (1966-1969)
