= Interstate 264 =

Interstate 264 is the designation for two Interstate Highways in the United States, both of which are related to Interstate 64:

- Interstate 264 (Kentucky), a bypass of Louisville, Kentucky
- Interstate 264 (Virginia), a route through Norfolk, Virginia and a spur to Virginia Beach, Virginia
