= Japan National Route 263 =

National highway in Japan

National Route 263
- 国道263号
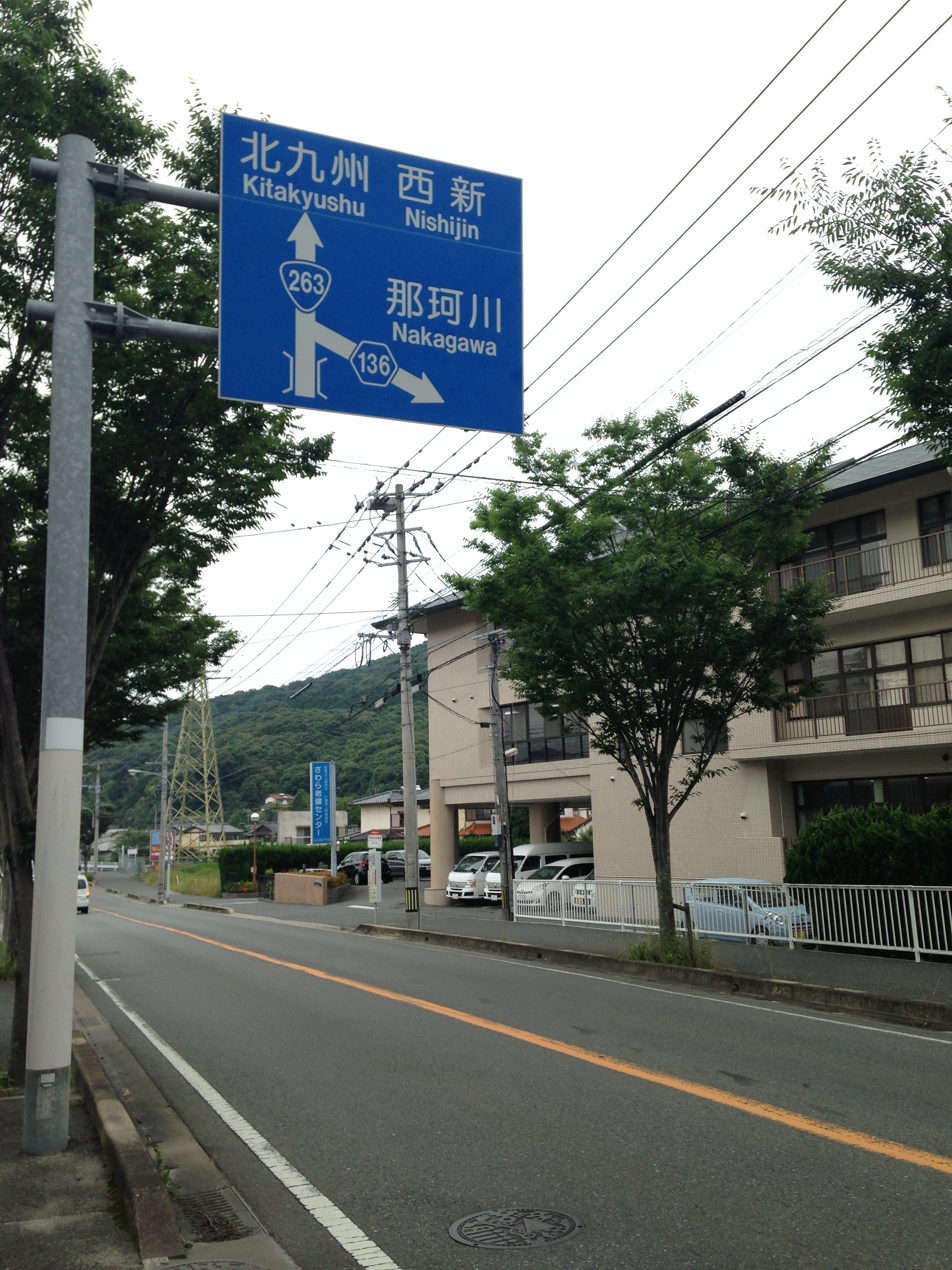

Route information
- Length: 48.0 km (29.8 mi)

Location
- Country: Japan

Highway system
- National highways of Japan; Expressways of Japan
← National Route 262	→ National Route 264

National Route 263 is a national highway of Japan connecting Sawara-ku, Fukuoka and Saga, Saga in Japan, with a total length of 48 km (29.83 mi).

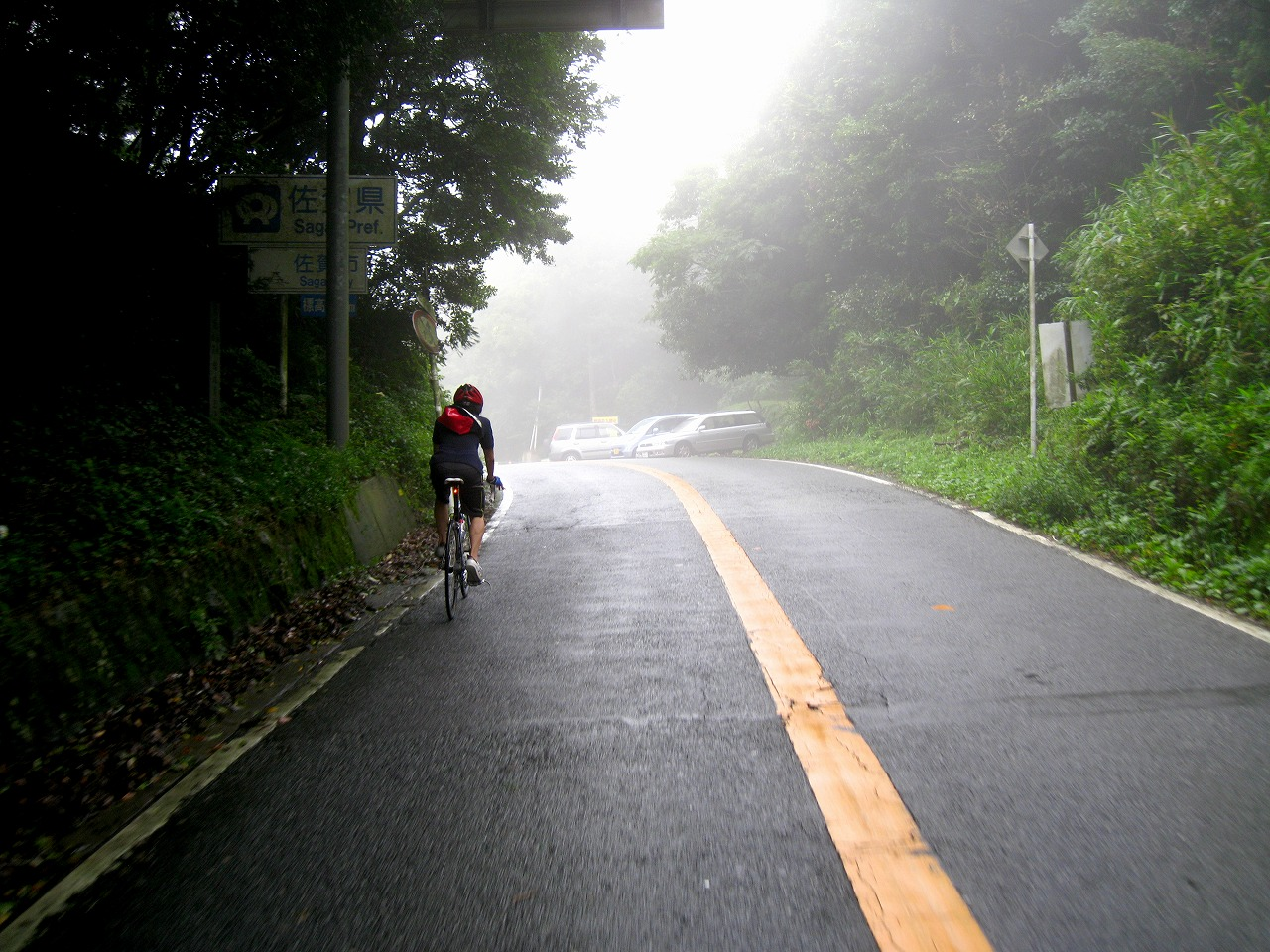
Mitsuse Pass, on the border between Fukuoka and Saga Prefectures.

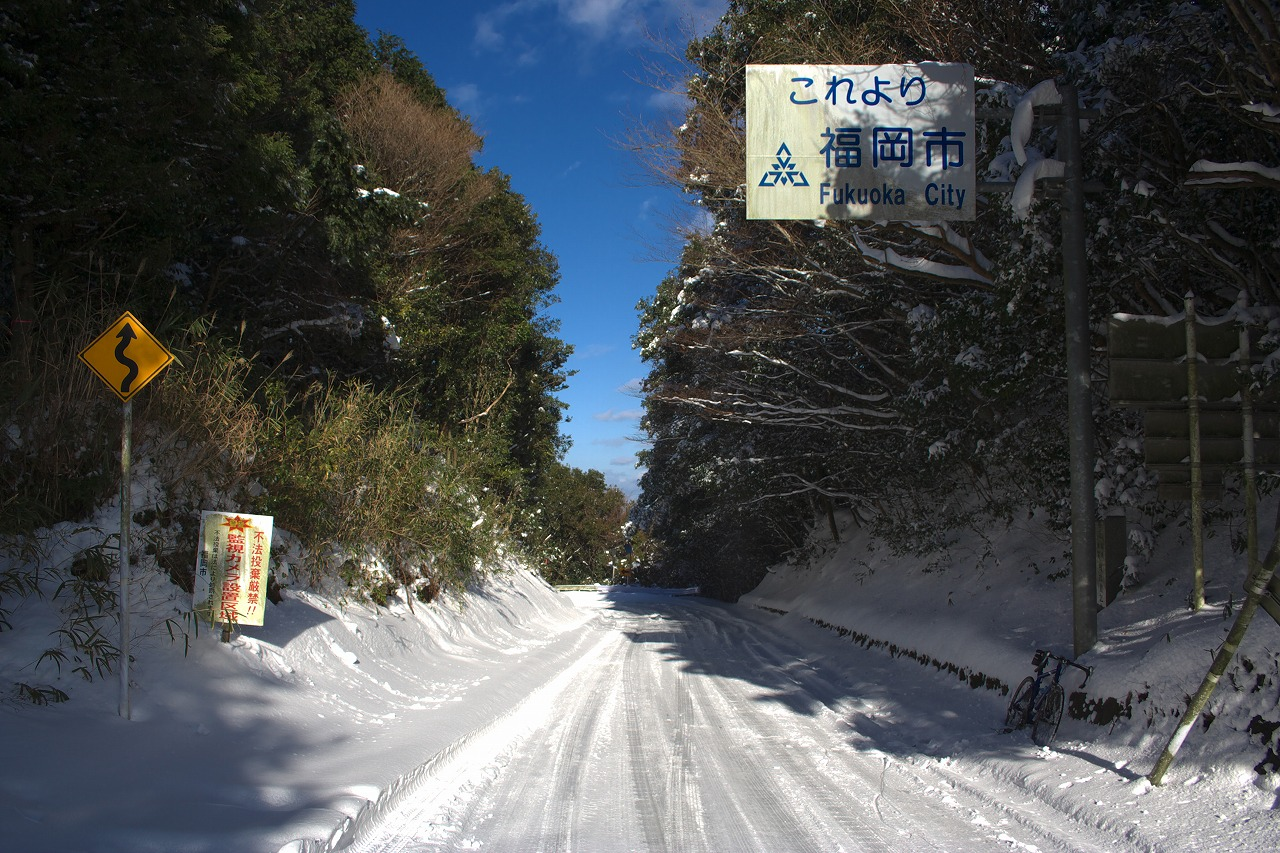
Mitsuse Pass in winter.
