= Utah State Route 263 =

Utah State Route 263 may refer to:

- Utah State Route 263 (1959-1969)
- Utah State Route 263 (1969-1985)
