= Japan National Route 264 =

National highway in Japan

National Route 264
- 国道264号
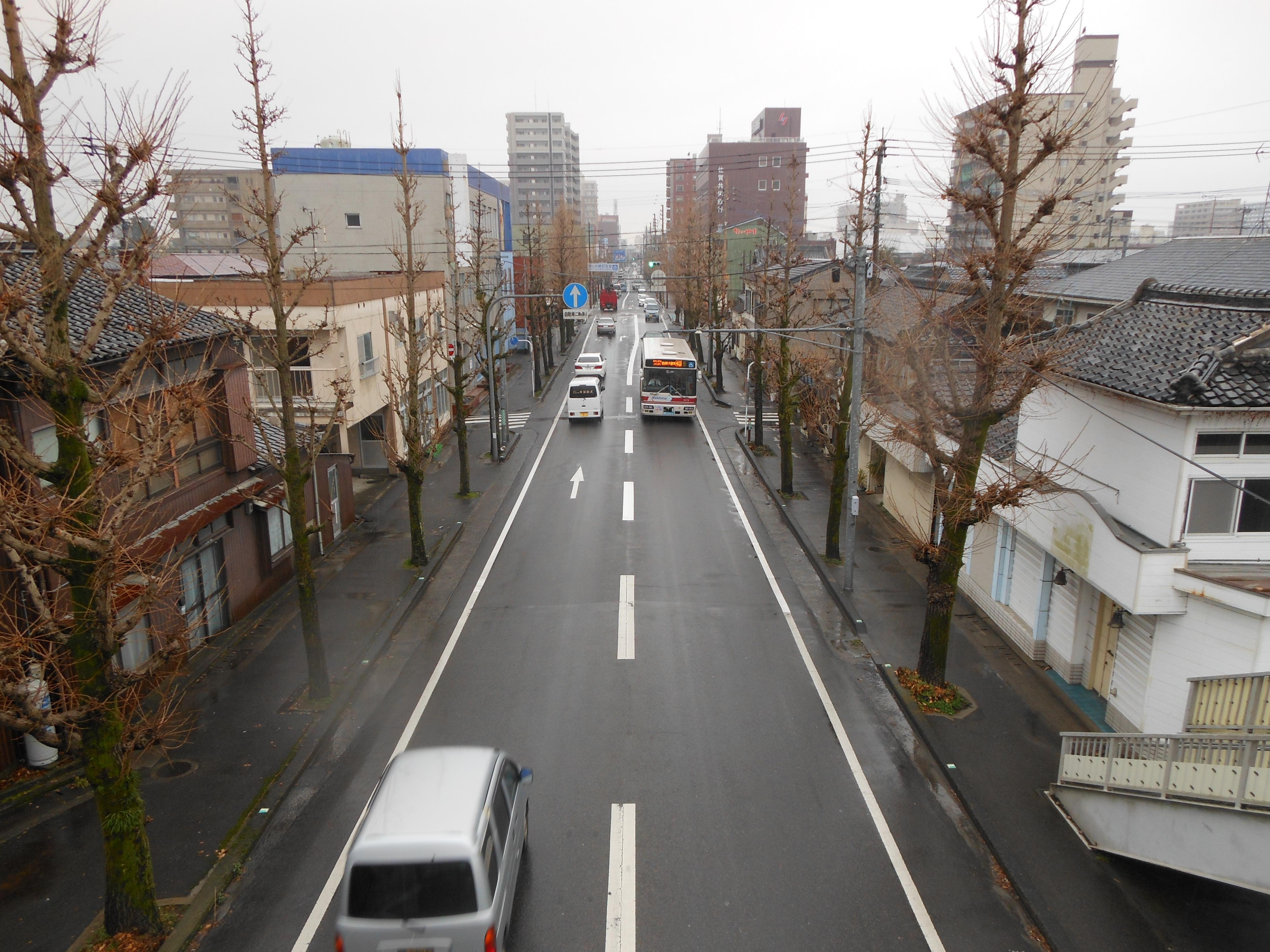

Route information
- Length: 27.4 km (17.0 mi)

Major junctions
- West end: National Route 34 / National Route 263 in Saga, Saga
- National Route 207; National Route 385; National Route 209
- East end: National Route 3 / National Route 322 in Kurume, Fukuoka

Location
- Country: Japan

Highway system
- National highways of Japan; Expressways of Japan
← National Route 263	→ National Route 265

National Route 264 is a national highway of Japan connecting Saga, Saga and Kurume, Fukuoka in Japan, with a total length of 27.4 km (17.0 mi)
