= Japan National Route 265 =

Road in Japan

National Route 265
- 国道265号
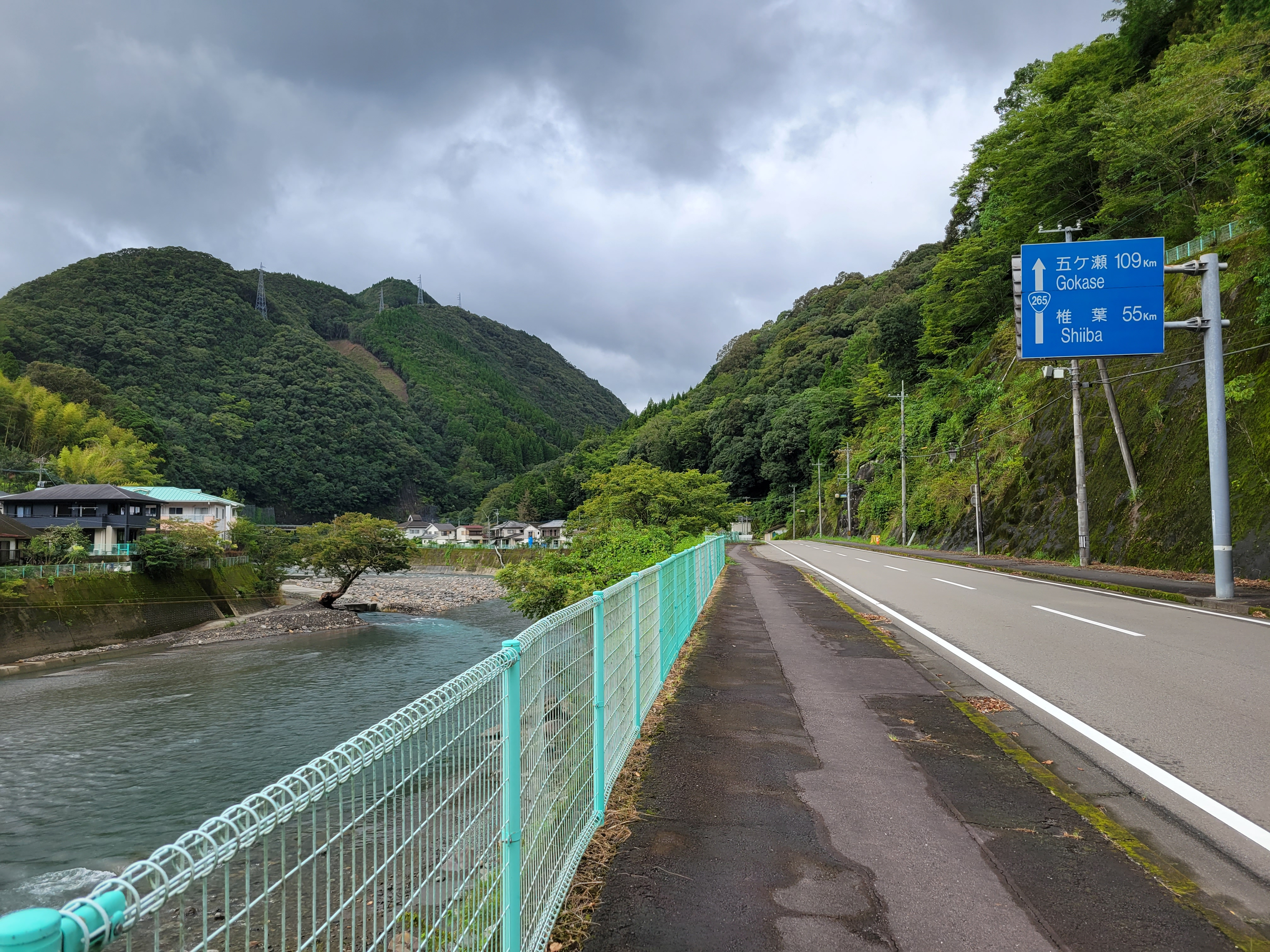

Route information
- Length: 203.8 km (126.6 mi)

Location
- Country: Japan

Highway system
- National highways of Japan; Expressways of Japan
| ← National Route 264 | → National Route 266 |

National Route 265 is a national highway of Japan connecting Kobayashi, Miyazaki and Aso, Kumamoto in Japan, with a total length of 203.8 km (126.64 mi).

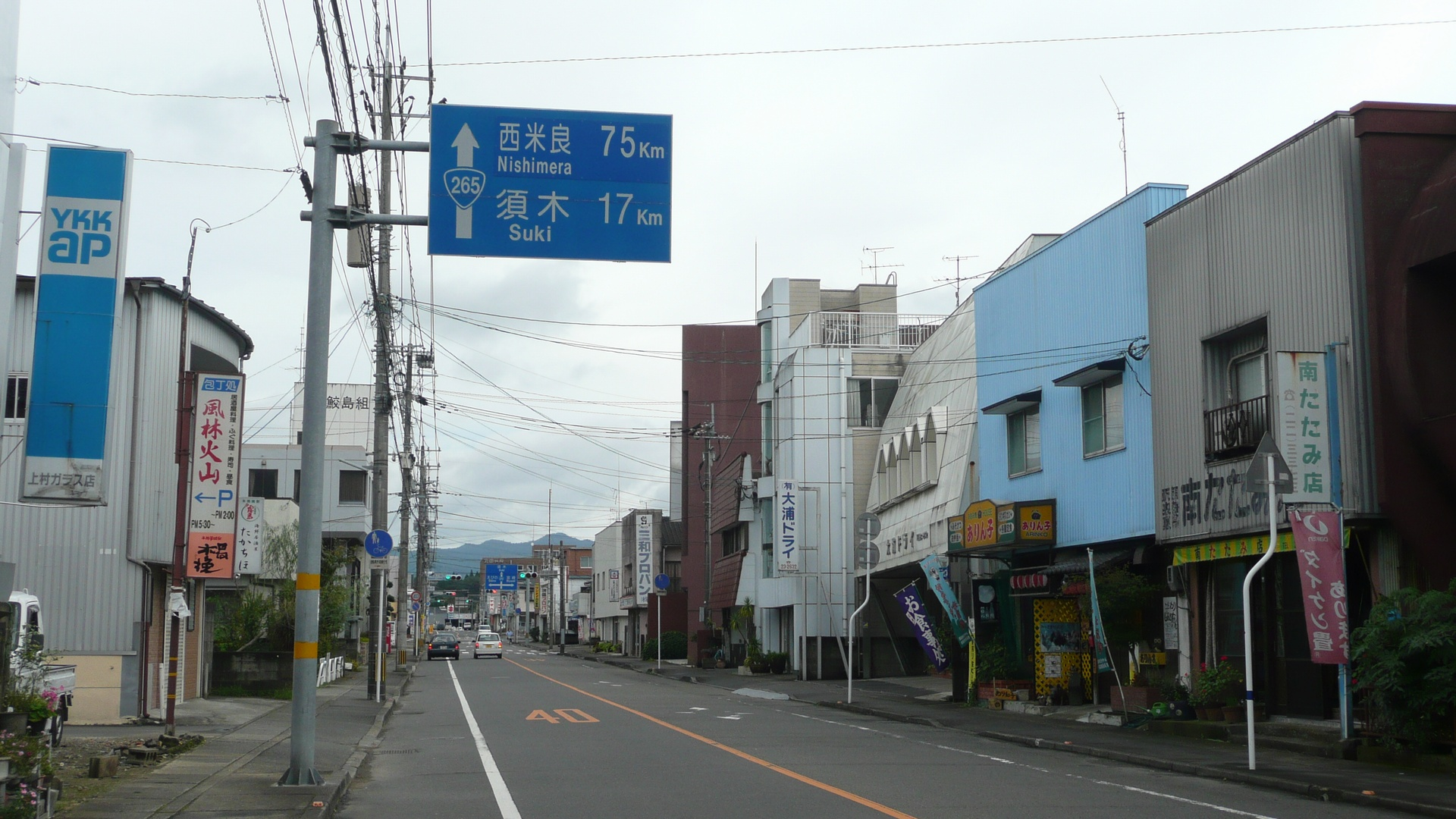
Kobayashi City

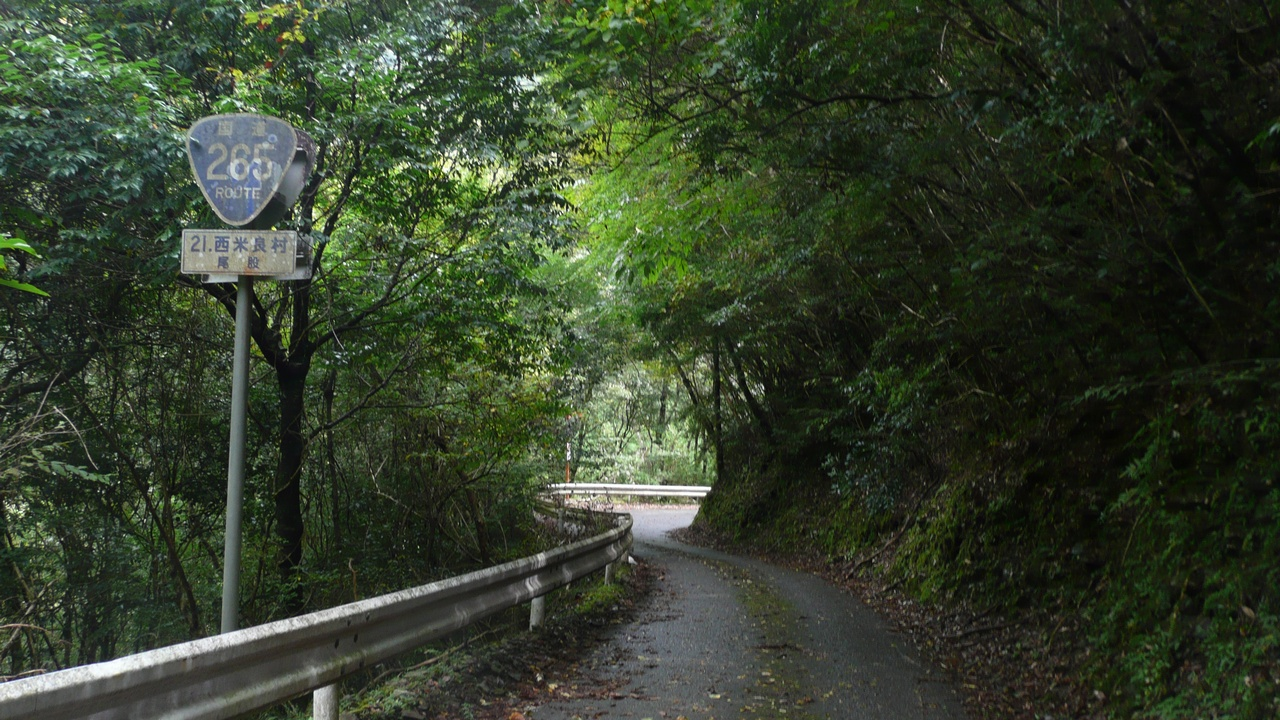
Omata, Nishimera Village, Miyazaki

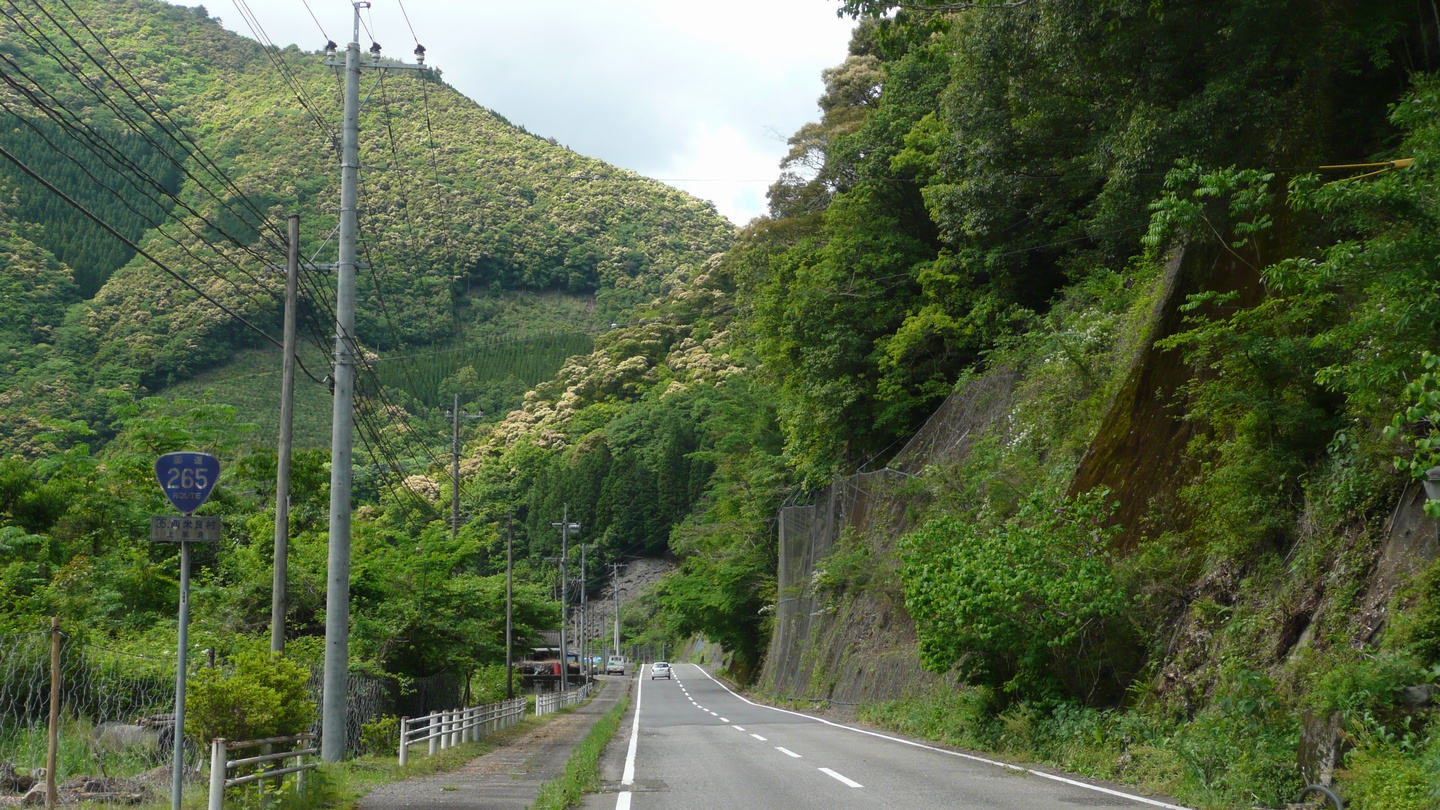
Kanmera, Nishimera Village

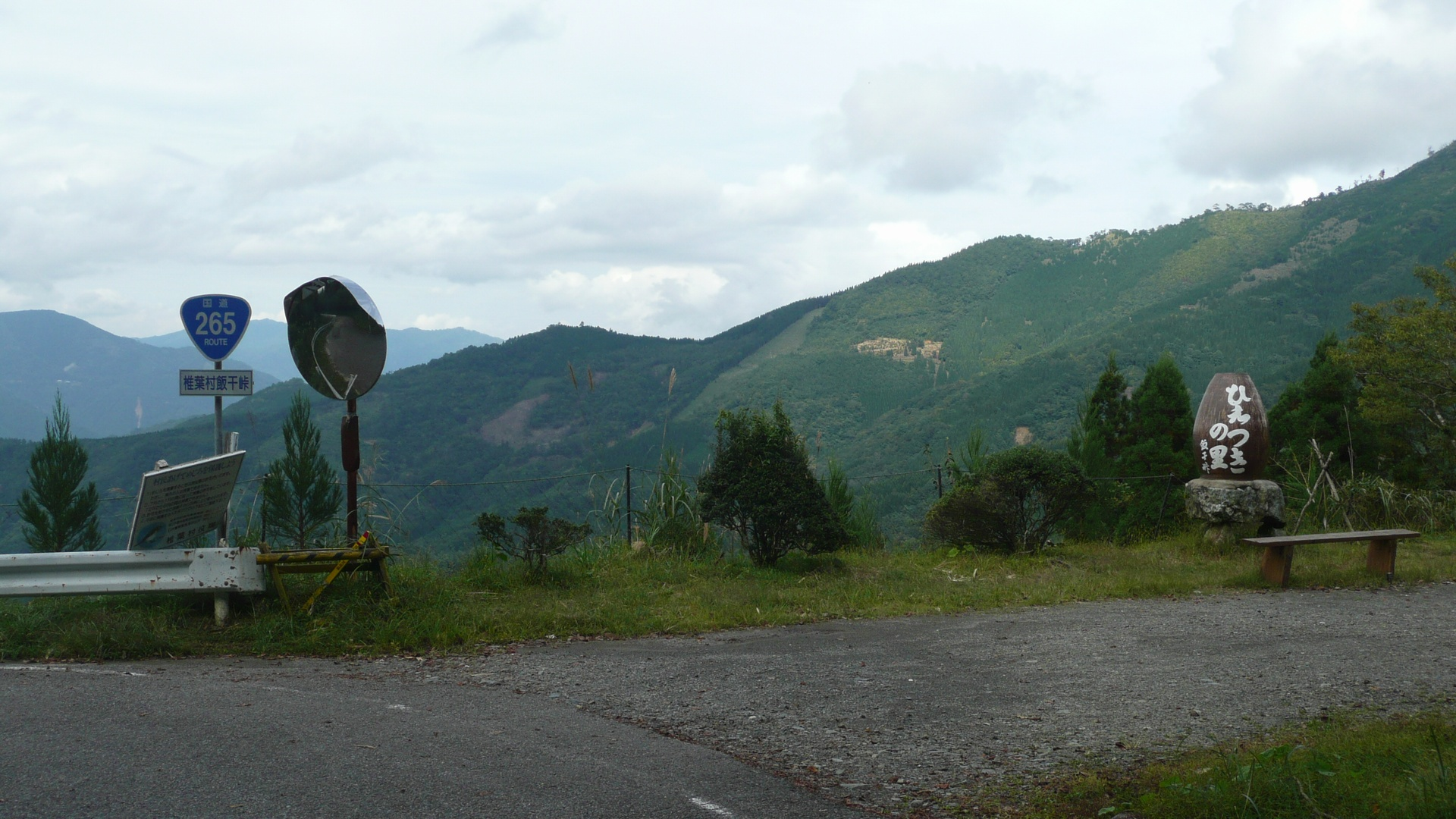
Iiboshi Pass (Shiiba Village, Miyazaki)
