= Alabama State Route 267 =

State highway in Alabama, United States

State Route 267
- Shug Jordan Parkway
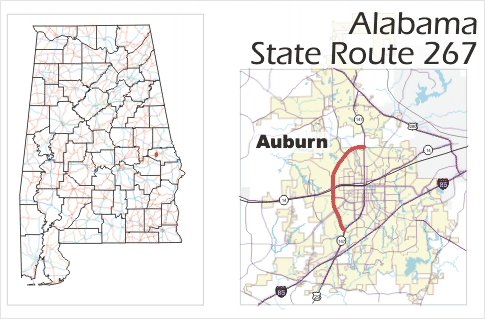

Route information
- Maintained by ALDOT
- Length: 5.055 mi (8.135 km)
- Existed: 1986–2015

Major junctions
- South end: SR 147 at Auburn
- SR 14 at Auburn
- North end: SR 147 at Auburn

Location
- Country: United States
- State: Alabama
- Counties: Lee

Highway system
- Alabama State Highway System; Interstate; US; State
| ← SR 265 | → SR 269 |

State Route 267 (SR 267) was a state highway in Alabama and a loop route of SR 147, bypassing downtown Auburn to the west. For its entire 5.1-mile (8.2 km) length, SR 267 was known as the Shug Jordan Parkway (named for Auburn University football coach Ralph "Shug" Jordan).

== Route description ==
With the exception of a 900-yard (820 m) segment at the northern terminus, State Route 267 was routed wholly within the city limits of Auburn. The highway made up the western half of Auburn's circumferential inner loop, University Drive.

SR 267 began at SR 147 (South College Street) at the southernmost point of the Auburn University campus. From there, it headed north-northwest and traveled through the college's agricultural research fields for the next two miles (3 km). At milepost 2.3, SR 267 had a one-quadrant interchange with SR 14. SR 267 then turned to the northeast for the next 2.8 miles (4.5 km) before terminating back at SR 147 (now North College Street).

== History ==
The original designation of SR 267 was U.S. Route 29. In 1986, the 5.1-mile (8.2 km) segment in Auburn was reassigned as the present-day SR 267.

The initial planning for SR 267 began in the mid-1950s, when the City of Auburn first began planning for a perimeter road. While the eastern half of this perimeter road (named University Drive in the early 1960s) would follow segments of existing roads, the western half would be completely new. In addition, the western segment would cut across the property of Auburn University, a state institution over which the city had no power of eminent domain to acquire right-of-way. As such, this western segment was turned over to the Alabama Department of Transportation for construction and maintenance.

Initial right-of-way acquisition began in 1966, with construction beginning the following year. The original design called for a four-lane limited-access expressway, with interchanges at SR 14 and Wire Road; however, budget constraints eliminated all grade separations except for the one at SR 14. The highway was completed in 1971 as "West University Drive" and was soon renamed "Shug Jordan Parkway", for the famed Auburn University football coach Ralph Jordan.

SR 267 ceased to exist on October 27, 2015, when SR 147 was rerouted over SR 267.

== Major intersections ==
The entire route was in Auburn, Lee County.

| mi | km | Destinations | Notes |
|---|---|---|---|
| 0.000 | 0.000 | SR 147 (S. College Street) / E. University Drive | Southern terminus |
| 2.240 | 3.605 | SR 14 – Auburn, Notasulga | |
| 5.055 | 8.135 | SR 147 (N. College Street) / E. University Drive | Northern terminus |
1.000 mi = 1.609 km; 1.000 km = 0.621 mi
