= Japan National Route 262 =

Road in Yamaguchi prefecture, Japan

Coordinates: 34°10′26″N 131°30′13″E

National Route 262
- 国道262号
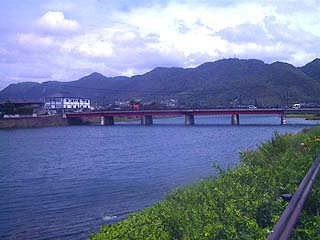

Route information
- Length: 57.2 km (35.5 mi)

Location
- Country: Japan

Highway system
- National highways of Japan; Expressways of Japan
← National Route 261	→ National Route 263

National Route 262 is a national highway of Japan connecting Hagi, Yamaguchi and Hōfu, Yamaguchi in Japan, with a total length of 57.2 km (35.54 mi).
