= Slettningen =

Lake in Innlandet, Norway

- Slettingen / Sletningen (historic)
- Interactive map of the lake
- Location: Vang Municipality, Innlandet
- Coordinates: 61°12′24″N 8°6′53″E
- Basin countries: Norway
- Max. length: 4 kilometres (2.5 mi)
- Max. width: 1.8 kilometres (1.1 mi)
- Surface area: 3.38 km^{2} (1.31 sq mi)
- Shore length^{1}: 20.76 kilometres (12.90 mi)
- Surface elevation: 1,228 metres (4,029 ft)
- References: NVE
- ^{1} Shore length is not a well-defined measure.

Slettningen is a lake in Vang Municipality in Innlandet county, Norway. The 3.38-square-kilometre (1.31 sq mi) lake lies in the Filefjell area, about 4 kilometres (2.5 mi) west of the village of Tyinkrysset.

== See also ==
- List of lakes in Norway
