= Ryfoss =

Village in Vang Municipality, Norway

- Village
- Interactive map of Ryfoss
- Location within Innlandet Location within Norway
- Coordinates: 61.13841°N 8.82221°E
- Country: Norway
- Region: Eastern Norway
- County: Innlandet
- District: Valdres
- Municipality: Vang Municipality
- Elevation: 407 m (1,335 ft)
- Time zone: UTC+01:00 (CET)
  - Summer (DST): UTC+02:00 (CEST)
- Post Code: 2973 Ryfoss

Ryfoss is a village in Vang Municipality in Innlandet county, Norway. The village is located along the river Storåne, just west of the lake Slidrefjorden. The European route E16 highway runs through the village, heading west through the Filefjell mountains on the way to the west coast of Norway. The medieval Høre Stave Church is located about 3 kilometres (1.9 mi) to the northwest of the village and the village of Hensgardane lies about 8 kilometres (5.0 mi) to the northwest of Ryfoss. The village has some industry, including a sawmill, a concrete goods factory, as well as a small shopping centre.
