= Nystuen =

Village in Vang Municipality, Norway

Nystuen / Nystøgo Nystova (historic)
- Village
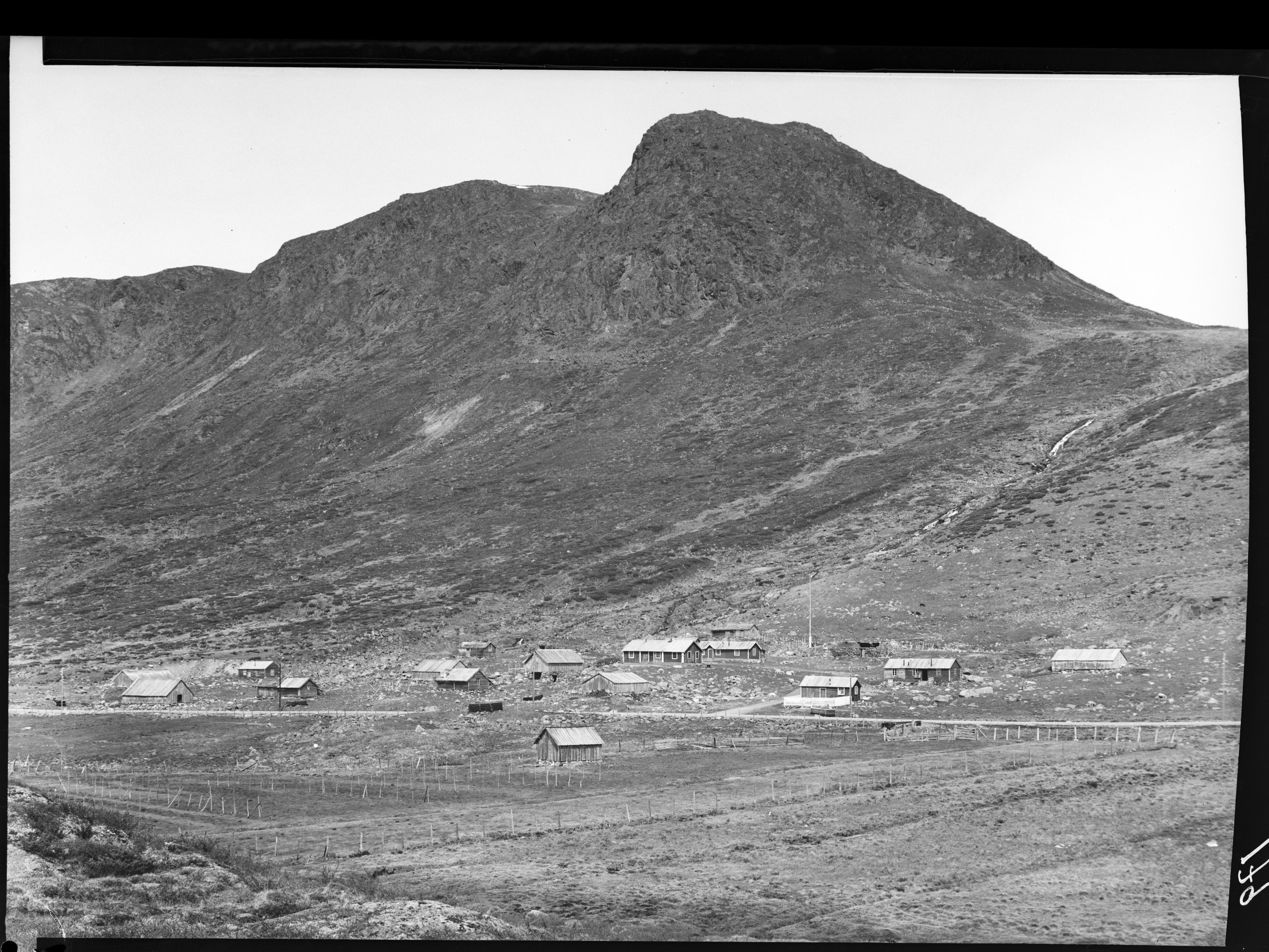
- View of the village (mid-20th century)
- Interactive map of Nystuen / Nystøgo
- Location within Innlandet Location within Norway
- Coordinates: 61.18048°N 8.16643°E
- Country: Norway
- Region: Eastern Norway
- County: Innlandet
- District: Valdres
- Municipality: Vang Municipality
- Elevation: 980 m (3,220 ft)
- Time zone: UTC+01:00 (CET)
  - Summer (DST): UTC+02:00 (CEST)
- Post Code: 2985 Tyinkrysset

Nystuen or Nystøgo is a village in Vang Municipality in Innlandet county, Norway. The village is located at an elevation of about 1,000 metres (3,300 ft) above sea level. The village area sits at the western end of the lake Otrøvatnet in the Filefjell mountain area. The village is the site of an old state hotel.

== History ==
From time immemorial, there has been a road through Nystuen over the Filefjell mountain area connecting Oppland in Eastern Norway with Lærdal Municipality in Western Norway. The old road followed the south side of the lake Otrøvatnet and there was an old inn where the village now sits. Traffic through the area increased during the 17th century. In 1627, the St. Thomas Church was built just west of the village. A new "modern" road was built through the area in the 1790s and this road was built to accommodate the increased use of horse and buggy transportation. This new road was built along the north side of the lake. During this time the mountain lodge in Nystuen became one of the most important in all of Filefjell. As tourism developed by the second half of the 19th century, the lodge was expanded several times into the Nystuen Hotel. It was an important starting point for mountain trips both towards Årdal, Jotunheimen, and Hemsedal. Nystuen was a very popular high mountain hotel for a long time. Starting in 1936, Widerøe flew tourists with sea planes to the lake. Between 1951 and 1961, an important attraction in the village was the bears Pekka and Lisa who lived in an enclosure near the hotel. In 1958, the hotel burned down and most of the building stock was lost. A new main hotel building was ready in 1964. Towards the turn of the century, Nystuen Hotell struggled with profitability and it was converted into apartments in 2005–2006. Today the area has many holiday cottages.
