= Vang Church =

Vang Church may refer to:

- Vang Church (Hamar), a church in Hamar municipality in Innlandet county, Norway
- Vang Church (Vang), a church in Vang municipality in Innlandet county, Norway
- Vang Evangelical Lutheran Church , a church in Wells County, North Dakota in the United States
- Vang Stave Church, a church in Karpacz, Lower Silesia, Poland
