= Vang Municipality =

Municipality in Innlandet, Norway

Vang Municipality Vang kommune
- Municipality
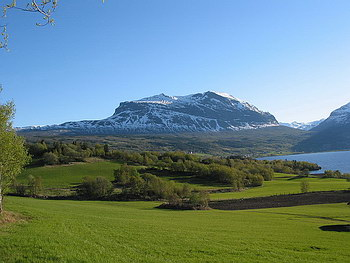

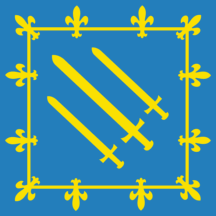
- Flag Coat of arms

- Innlandet within Norway

- Vang within Innlandet
- Coordinates: 61°12′52″N 8°30′15″E
- Country: Norway
- County: Innlandet
- District: Valdres
- Established: 1 Jan 1838
  - Created as: Formannskapsdistrikt
- Administrative centre: Vang i Valdres

Government
  - Mayor (2023): Jørand Ødegård Lunde (BL)

Area
  - Total: 1,504.84 km^{2} (581.02 sq mi)
  - Land: 1,309.45 km^{2} (505.58 sq mi)
  - Water: 195.39 km^{2} (75.44 sq mi) 13%
  - Rank: #55 in Norway
- Highest elevation: 2,208.09 m (7,244.4 ft)

Population (2025)
  - Total: 1,648
  - Rank: #299 in Norway
  - Density: 1.1/km^{2} (2.8/sq mi)
  - Change (10 years): ▲ +2.7%
- Demonym: Vangsgjelding

Official language
  - Norwegian form: Nynorsk
- Time zone: UTC+01:00 (CET)
  - Summer (DST): UTC+02:00 (CEST)
- ISO 3166 code: NO-3454
- Website: Official website

Vang is a municipality in Innlandet county, Norway. It is located in the traditional district of Valdres. The administrative centre of the municipality is the village of Vang i Valdres. Other villages in Vang include Hensgardane, Nystuen, Øye, Ryfoss, and Tyinkrysset.

The 1,504.84-square-kilometre (581.02 sq mi) municipality is the 55th largest by area out of the 357 municipalities in Norway. Vang Municipality is the 299th most populous municipality in Norway with a population of 1,648. The municipality's population density is 1.1 inhabitants per square kilometre (2.8/sq mi) and its population has increased by 2.7% over the previous 10-year period.

== General information ==
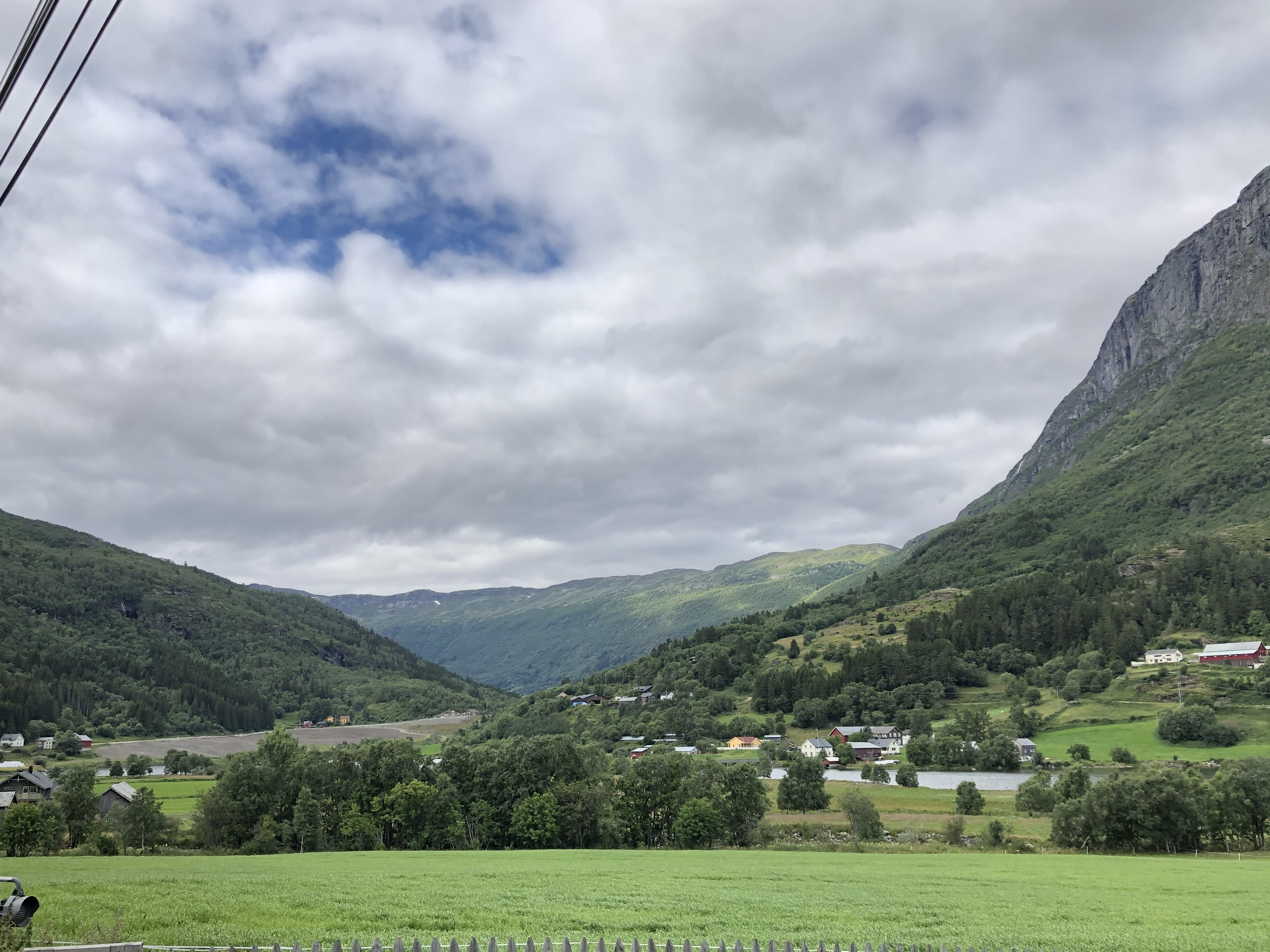
View of the Øye area

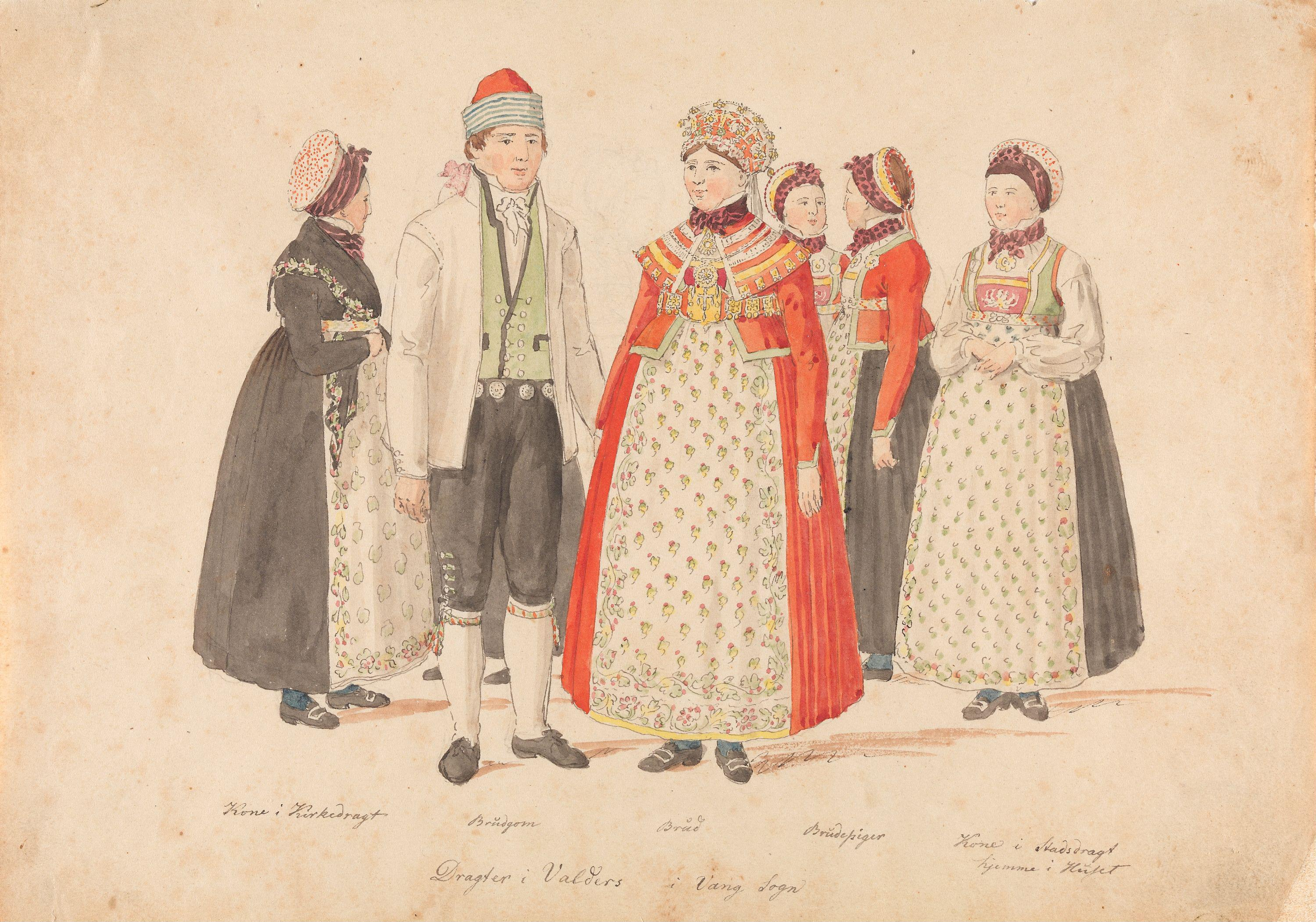
Drawing from 1820 of locals in their traditional clothing

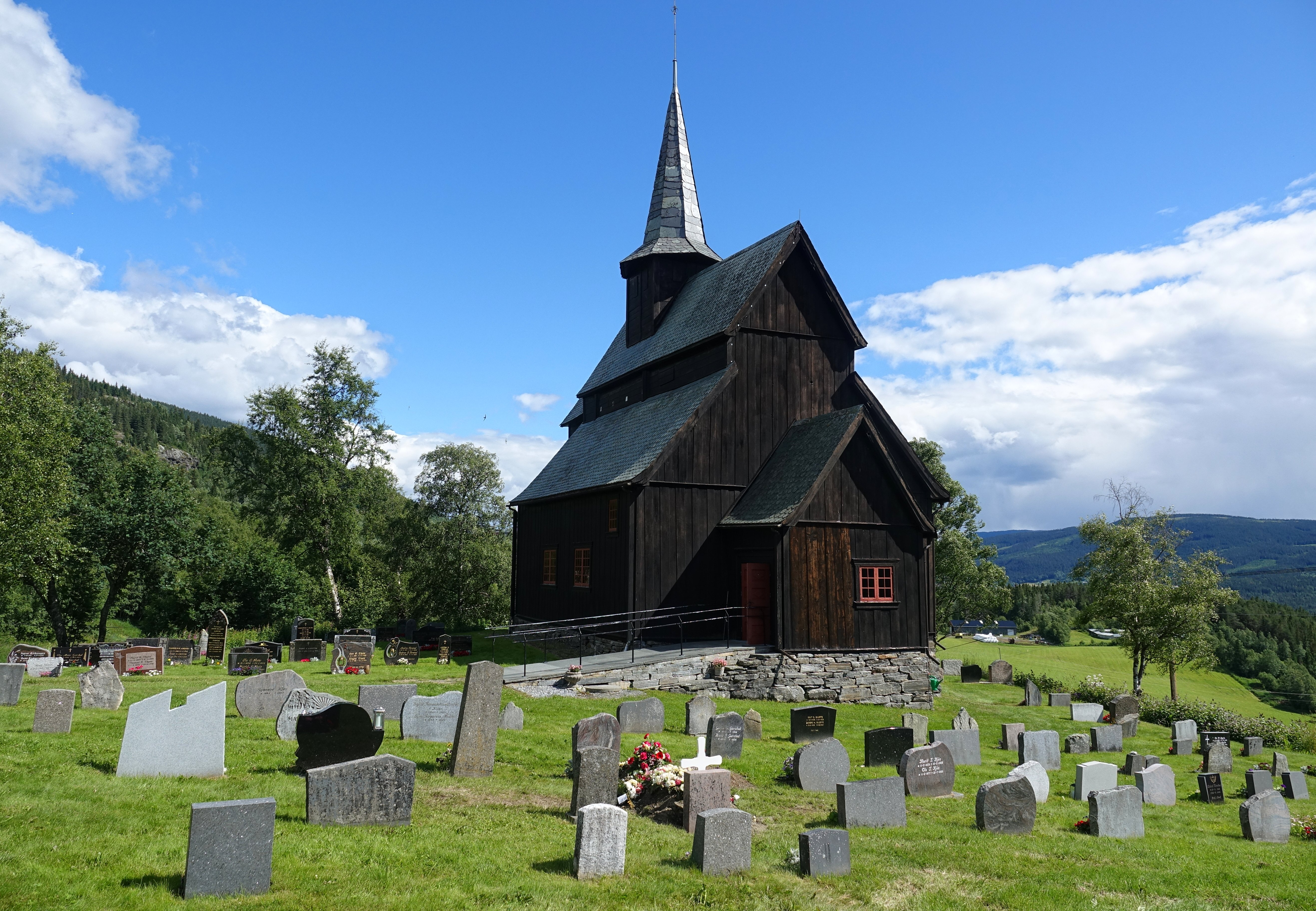
Høre Stave Church

On 1 January 1838, the prestegjeld of Vang was established as a civil municipality (see formannskapsdistrikt law). On 1 January 1882, a small area of Vang Municipality (population: 31) was transferred into the neighboring Øystre Slidre Municipality. The municipal boundaries have not changed since that time.

Historically, the municipality was part of the old Oppland county. On 1 January 2020, the municipality became a part of the newly-formed Innlandet county (after Hedmark and Oppland counties were merged).

=== Name ===
The municipality (originally the parish) is named after the old Vang farm (Old Norse: Vangr) since the first Vang Church was built there. The name is identical to the word vangr which means "field" or "meadow".

=== Coat of arms ===
The coat of arms was granted by royal decree on 26 June 1987. The official blazon is "Azure, within a tressure floury three swords bendwise Or" (Norwegian: På blå grunn tre skråstilte gull sverd omgjevne av gull liljebord). This means the arms have a blue field (background) and the charge is three diagonal swords. The arms also have a border line with fleur-de-lis designs (tressure floury) going around the edge of the arms. The charge and border have a tincture of Or which means they are commonly colored yellow, but if it is made out of metal, then gold is used. The arms are based on historic descriptions and depictions of the personal arms the a local medieval nobleman Sigvat of Leirhol. He was named as one of the members of the delegation that followed King Håkon V Magnusson to Copenhagen in 1309. Later, he became the local governor of Valdres and Hallingdal (Vang is part of the Valdres region). He played a major role in the development of the region and the arms can be seen on different places, including in the local Vang Church. The arms were designed by Stein Davidsen. The municipal flag has the same design as the coat of arms.

=== Churches ===
The Church of Norway has four parishes (sokn) within Vang Municipality. It is part of the Valdres prosti (deanery) in the Diocese of Hamar.

Churches in Vang Municipality
| Parish (sokn) | Church name | Location of the church | Year built |
|---|---|---|---|
| Heensåsen | Heensåsen Church | Hensgardane | 1902 |
| Høre | Høre Stave Church | near Ryfoss | 1180 |
| Vang | Vang Church | Vang i Valdres | 1840 |
| Øye | Øye Church | Øye | 1747 |
| Øye | Øye Stave Church | Øye | 1965 |
| Øye | St. Thomas Church | Nystuen | 1971 |

== History ==
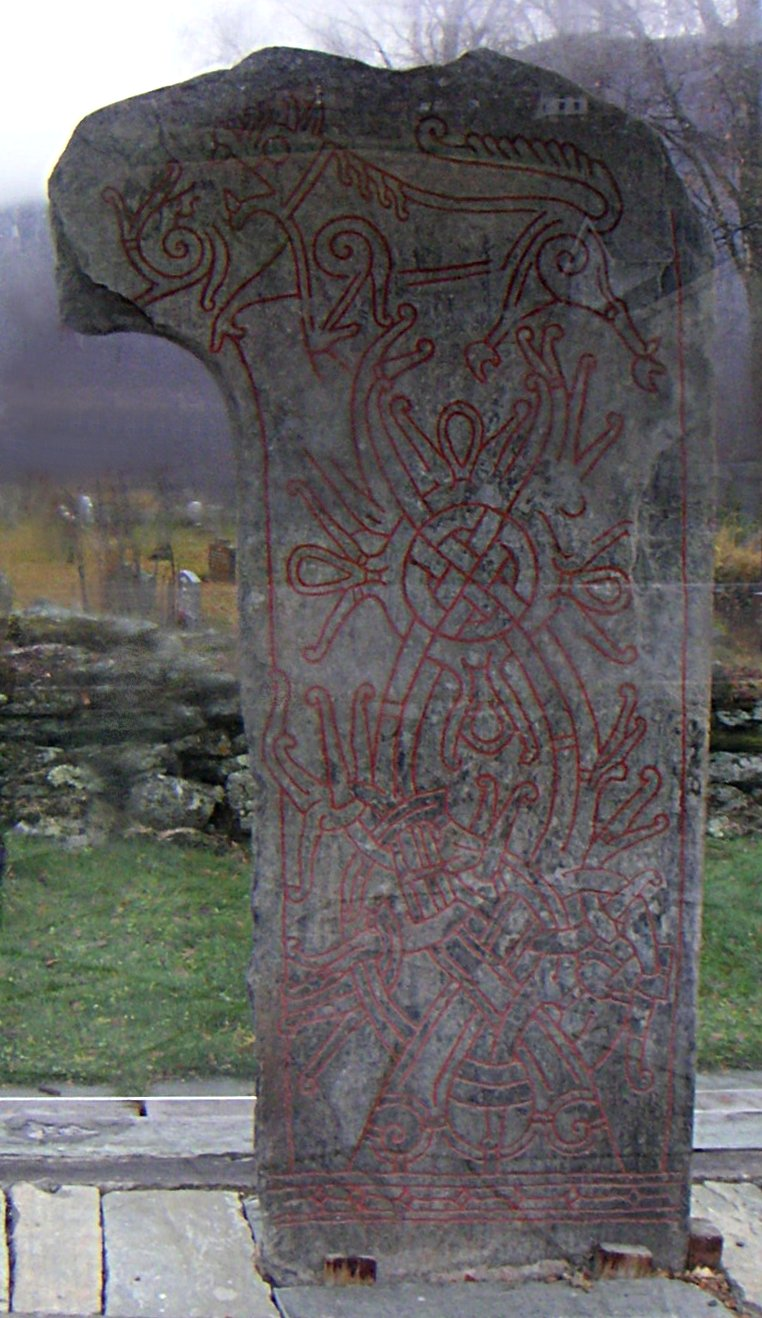
Vangssteinen

Vang, like the rest of Valdres, was originally populated by migrants from Vestlandet. In 1153, recognizing this, Cardinal Breakspear included these valleys in the Diocese of Stavanger.

The ancient Vang Church was the site of a legal court (thing) held by King Haakon VI in 1368. Here, he settled a boundary dispute. The boundary stone which resulted stands to this day.

High up the slopes of Filefjell is the site of Nystuen, where travellers found refuge as they passed across the divide into Vestlandet. On the other side of the pass, Maristua was erected at the direction of Queen Margaret c. 1390. Although Nystuen is first mentioned in 1627, it is undoubtedly older. These refuges were maintained by the state until 1830.

Number of minorities (1st and 2nd generation) in Vang by country of origin in 2017
| Ancestry | Number |
|---|---|
| Poland | 55 |
| Lithuania | 44 |
| Syria | 25 |

Smeddalen (Smith's Valley) immediately to the west of Nystuen, was for centuries the site of the church of St. Thomas på Filefjell. The earliest reference to it is in 1615, but it was apparently a stave church, so would have been much older. According to F.N. Stagg "It was reconditioned (c. 1615)… the priest at Vang preached there once a year–on July 2nd… many sought cures for their ailments in the miraculous powers possessed by splinters from its timbers…" A market grew up near the church as a result of the 2 July service. "Horses were traded, races run, heavy drinking indulged in and many a fight ensued." Markets continued to be held near the church until the 19th century, but as a result of fighting and general unrest in connection with the market days the church was torn down in 1808. A new church was built on the site in 1971.

== Government ==
Vang Municipality is responsible for primary education (through 10th grade), outpatient health services, senior citizen services, welfare and other social services, zoning, economic development, and municipal roads and utilities. The municipality is governed by a municipal council of directly elected representatives. The mayor is indirectly elected by a vote of the municipal council. The municipality is under the jurisdiction of the Vestoppland og Valdres District Court and the Eidsivating Court of Appeal.

=== Municipal council ===
The municipal council (Kommunestyre) of Vang Municipality is made up of 17 representatives that are elected to four year terms. The tables below show the current and historical composition of the council by political party.

Vang kommunestyre 2023–2027
| Party name (in Nynorsk) | Number of representatives |
|---|---|
| Labour Party (Arbeidarpartiet) | 7 |
| Red Party (Raudt) | 1 |
| Centre Party (Senterpartiet) | 3 |
| Local list in Vang (Bygdelista i Vang) | 6 |
| Total number of members: | 17 |

Vang kommunestyre 2019–2023
| Party name (in Nynorsk) | Number of representatives |
|---|---|
| Labour Party (Arbeidarpartiet) | 9 |
| Green Party (Miljøpartiet Dei Grøne) | 1 |
| Centre Party (Senterpartiet) | 4 |
| Local list in Vang (Bygdelista i Vang) | 3 |
| Total number of members: | 17 |

Vang kommunestyre 2015–2019
| Party name (in Nynorsk) | Number of representatives |
|---|---|
| Labour Party (Arbeidarpartiet) | 7 |
| Green Party (Miljøpartiet Dei Grøne) | 1 |
| Centre Party (Senterpartiet) | 7 |
| Local list in Vang (Bygdelista i Vang) | 2 |
| Total number of members: | 17 |

Vang kommunestyre 2011–2015
| Party name (in Nynorsk) | Number of representatives |
|---|---|
| Labour Party (Arbeidarpartiet) | 9 |
| Conservative Party (Høgre) | 2 |
| Centre Party (Senterpartiet) | 5 |
| Local list in Vang (Bygdelista i Vang) | 1 |
| Total number of members: | 17 |

Vang kommunestyre 2007–2011
| Party name (in Nynorsk) | Number of representatives |
|---|---|
| Labour Party (Arbeidarpartiet) | 4 |
| Conservative Party (Høgre) | 2 |
| Centre Party (Senterpartiet) | 8 |
| Local list (Bygdelista) | 3 |
| Total number of members: | 17 |

Vang kommunestyre 2003–2007
| Party name (in Nynorsk) | Number of representatives |
|---|---|
| Labour Party (Arbeidarpartiet) | 3 |
| Conservative Party (Høgre) | 2 |
| Centre Party (Senterpartiet) | 8 |
| Local list (Bygdelista) | 4 |
| Total number of members: | 17 |

Vang kommunestyre 1999–2003
| Party name (in Nynorsk) | Number of representatives |
|---|---|
| Labour Party (Arbeidarpartiet) | 2 |
| Conservative Party (Høgre) | 1 |
| Centre Party (Senterpartiet) | 8 |
| Local list (Bygdelista) | 6 |
| Total number of members: | 17 |

Vang kommunestyre 1995–1999
| Party name (in Nynorsk) | Number of representatives |
|---|---|
| Labour Party (Arbeidarpartiet) | 5 |
| Conservative Party (Høgre) | 1 |
| Centre Party (Senterpartiet) | 11 |
| Total number of members: | 17 |

Vang kommunestyre 1991–1995
| Party name (in Nynorsk) | Number of representatives |
|---|---|
| Labour Party (Arbeidarpartiet) | 5 |
| Conservative Party (Høgre) | 2 |
| Christian Democratic Party (Kristeleg Folkeparti) | 1 |
| Centre Party (Senterpartiet) | 9 |
| Total number of members: | 17 |

Vang kommunestyre 1987–1991
| Party name (in Nynorsk) | Number of representatives |
|---|---|
| Labour Party (Arbeidarpartiet) | 6 |
| Conservative Party (Høgre) | 2 |
| Christian Democratic Party (Kristeleg Folkeparti) | 1 |
| Centre Party (Senterpartiet) | 8 |
| Total number of members: | 17 |

Vang kommunestyre 1983–1987
| Party name (in Nynorsk) | Number of representatives |
|---|---|
| Labour Party (Arbeidarpartiet) | 5 |
| Conservative Party (Høgre) | 4 |
| Christian Democratic Party (Kristeleg Folkeparti) | 1 |
| Centre Party (Senterpartiet) | 7 |
| Total number of members: | 17 |

Vang kommunestyre 1979–1983
| Party name (in Nynorsk) | Number of representatives |
|---|---|
| Labour Party (Arbeidarpartiet) | 5 |
| Conservative Party (Høgre) | 3 |
| Christian Democratic Party (Kristeleg Folkeparti) | 2 |
| Centre Party (Senterpartiet) | 7 |
| Total number of members: | 17 |

Vang kommunestyre 1975–1979
| Party name (in Nynorsk) | Number of representatives |
|---|---|
| Labour Party (Arbeidarpartiet) | 3 |
| Christian Democratic Party (Kristeleg Folkeparti) | 1 |
| Centre Party (Senterpartiet) | 7 |
| Non-party list (Upolitisk liste) | 5 |
| Free voters (Frie velgere) | 1 |
| Total number of members: | 17 |

Vang kommunestyre 1971–1975
| Party name (in Nynorsk) | Number of representatives |
|---|---|
| Labour Party (Arbeidarpartiet) | 4 |
| Local List(s) (Lokale lister) | 13 |
| Total number of members: | 17 |

Vang kommunestyre 1967–1971
| Party name (in Nynorsk) | Number of representatives |
|---|---|
| Labour Party (Arbeidarpartiet) | 2 |
| Centre Party (Senterpartiet) | 3 |
| Joint List(s) of Non-Socialist Parties (Borgarlege Felleslister) | 3 |
| Local List(s) (Lokale lister) | 9 |
| Total number of members: | 17 |

Vang kommunestyre 1963–1967
| Party name (in Nynorsk) | Number of representatives |
|---|---|
| Labour Party (Arbeidarpartiet) | 4 |
| Conservative Party (Høgre) | 1 |
| Centre Party (Senterpartiet) | 5 |
| Local List(s) (Lokale lister) | 7 |
| Total number of members: | 17 |

Vang heradsstyre 1959–1963
| Party name (in Nynorsk) | Number of representatives |
|---|---|
| Labour Party (Arbeidarpartiet) | 4 |
| List of workers, fishermen, and small farmholders (Arbeidarar, fiskarar, småbrukarar liste) | 3 |
| Joint List(s) of Non-Socialist Parties (Borgarlege Felleslister) | 10 |
| Total number of members: | 17 |

Vang heradsstyre 1955–1959
| Party name (in Nynorsk) | Number of representatives |
|---|---|
| Labour Party (Arbeidarpartiet) | 4 |
| Joint List(s) of Non-Socialist Parties (Borgarlege Felleslister) | 7 |
| Local List(s) (Lokale lister) | 6 |
| Total number of members: | 17 |

Vang heradsstyre 1951–1955
| Party name (in Nynorsk) | Number of representatives |
|---|---|
| Labour Party (Arbeidarpartiet) | 3 |
| List of workers, fishermen, and small farmholders (Arbeidarar, fiskarar, småbrukarar liste) | 1 |
| Joint List(s) of Non-Socialist Parties (Borgarlege Felleslister) | 7 |
| Local List(s) (Lokale lister) | 5 |
| Total number of members: | 16 |

Vang heradsstyre 1947–1951
| Party name (in Nynorsk) | Number of representatives |
|---|---|
| Labour Party (Arbeidarpartiet) | 2 |
| Joint List(s) of Non-Socialist Parties (Borgarlege Felleslister) | 10 |
| Local List(s) (Lokale lister) | 4 |
| Total number of members: | 16 |

Vang heradsstyre 1945–1947
| Party name (in Nynorsk) | Number of representatives |
|---|---|
| Labour Party (Arbeidarpartiet) | 4 |
| Local List(s) (Lokale lister) | 12 |
| Total number of members: | 16 |

Vang heradsstyre 1937–1941*
| Party name (in Nynorsk) | Number of representatives |
|---|---|
| Labour Party (Arbeidarpartiet) | 3 |
| Farmers' Party (Bondepartiet) | 9 |
| List of workers, fishermen, and small farmholders (Arbeidarar, fiskarar, småbrukarar liste) | 1 |
| Joint List(s) of Non-Socialist Parties (Borgarlege Felleslister) | 3 |
| Total number of members: | 16 |
Note: Due to the German occupation of Norway during World War II, no elections were held for new municipal councils until after the war ended in 1945.

=== Mayors ===
The mayor (Nynorsk: ordførar) of Vang Municipality is the political leader of the municipality and the chairperson of the municipal council. Here is a list of people who have held this position:

- 1838–1838: Rev. Thomas Stang
- 1838–1839: Ole A. Haalien
- 1839–1840: Anfind O. Qvame
- 1841–1843: Nils N. Helle
- 1844–1844: Rev. Peter Schnitler
- 1844–1845: Nils N. Helle
- 1845–1847: Rev. Carl Andreas Hansen
- 1847–1849: Ole Pedersen Framstad
- 1850–1861: Nils Wangensteen
- 1862–1877: Nils Trondsen Thune
- 1878–1881: Torger E. Haalien
- 1881–1884: Thomas H. Kjersteen
- 1884–1897: Thorstein H. Kvale
- 1897–1898: Knut E. Berge
- 1898–1901: Jørgen Wangensten
- 1901–1904: Lars O. Kvien (H)
- 1905–1919: Kristoffer K. Lerhol (H)
- 1919–1922: Ivar A. Opdal
- 1923–1925: Ole Wangensten (Bp)
- 1925–1926: Ivar A. Opdal
- 1926–1928: Olav Nystuen (Bp)
- 1929–1931: Ole Kvale (Bp)
- 1931–1934: Andris Larsen Wangensten (Bp)
- 1934–1937: Olav Nystuen (Bp)
- 1937–1945: Andris Larsen Wangensten (Bp)
- 1945–1945: Helge Ellingbø (LL)
- 1945–1945: Endre Holien (LL)
- 1946–1948: Torstein Hamre (LL)
- 1948–1952: Nils Thune (LL)
- 1952–1959: John Opdal (LL)
- 1960–1968: Ove W. Kvien (LL)
- 1968–1975: Jørgen Garstad (LL)
- 1976–1995: Erling Øraker (Sp)
- 1996–2011: Knut Haalien (Sp)
- 2011–2023: Vidar Eltun (Ap)
- 2023–present: Jørand Ødegård Lunde (LL)

== Geography ==
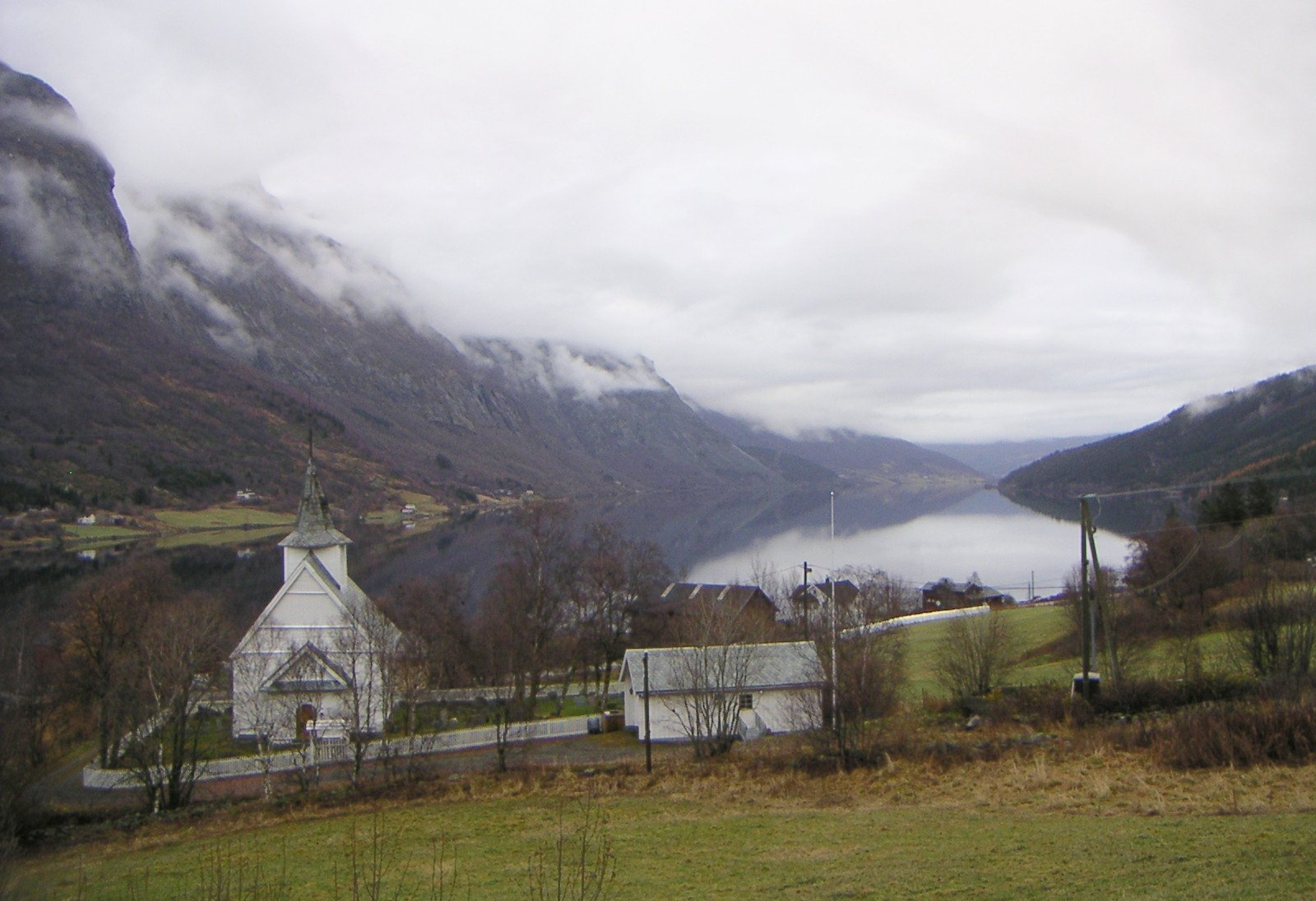
View from Øye

Vang is bordered to the north by Lom Municipality and Vågå Municipality, to the east by Øystre Slidre Municipality, to the southeast by Vestre Slidre Municipality, to the south by Hemsedal Municipality (in Buskerud county), and to the west by Lærdal Municipality and Årdal Municipality (in Vestland county).

Vang is part of the Valdres region in central, southern Norway. This region is situated between the Gudbrandsdal and Hallingdal valleys.

Vang Municipality is 56 kilometres (35 mi) on a north–south axis and 47.3 kilometres (29.4 mi) on an east–west axis. The highest point is Kalvehøgde with a height of 2,208 metres (7,244.1 ft) above sea level.

Three-quarters of the region is above 900 metres (3,000 ft). About 13 percent of the municipality is covered by water, including Lakes Fleinsendin, Slettningen and Vangsmjøsa. The lowest point is 363 metres (1,191 ft) above sea level. The river Begna has its headwaters in the Filefjell area of Vang.

== Attractions ==
- The Vang stone
- The Ryfossen waterfall
- The Sputrefossen waterfall

== Gallery ==
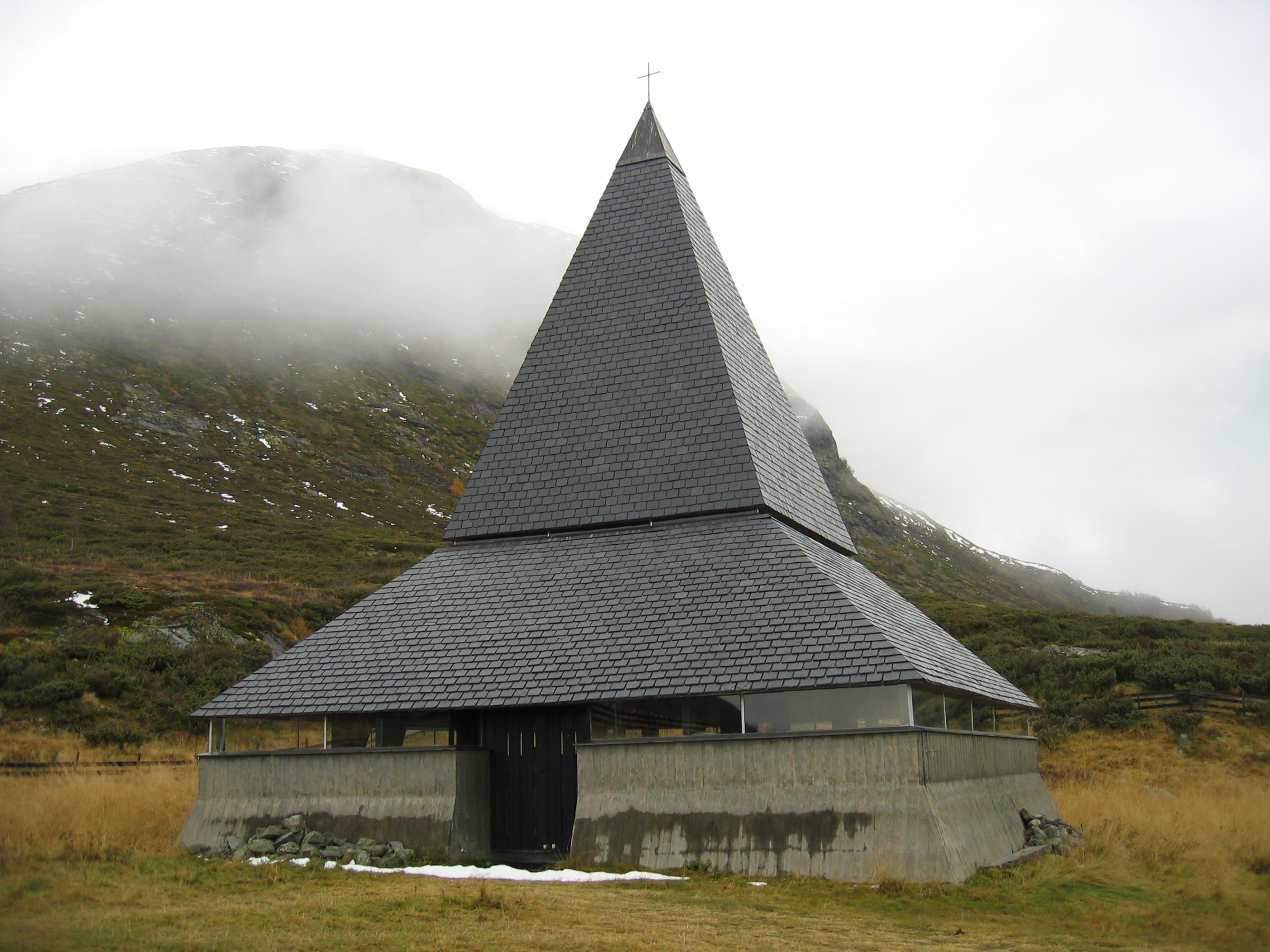
St. Thomas Church

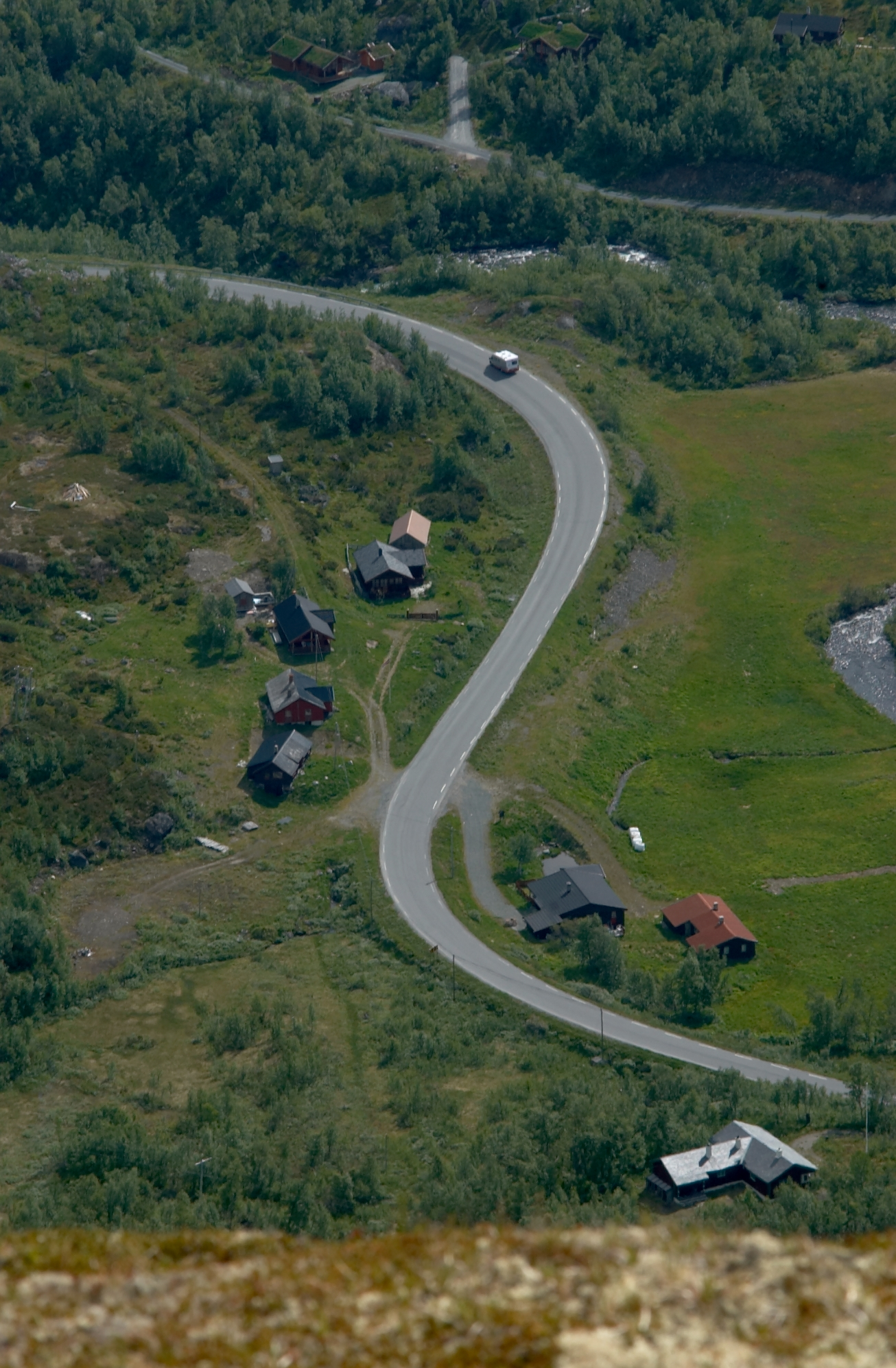
Highway E16

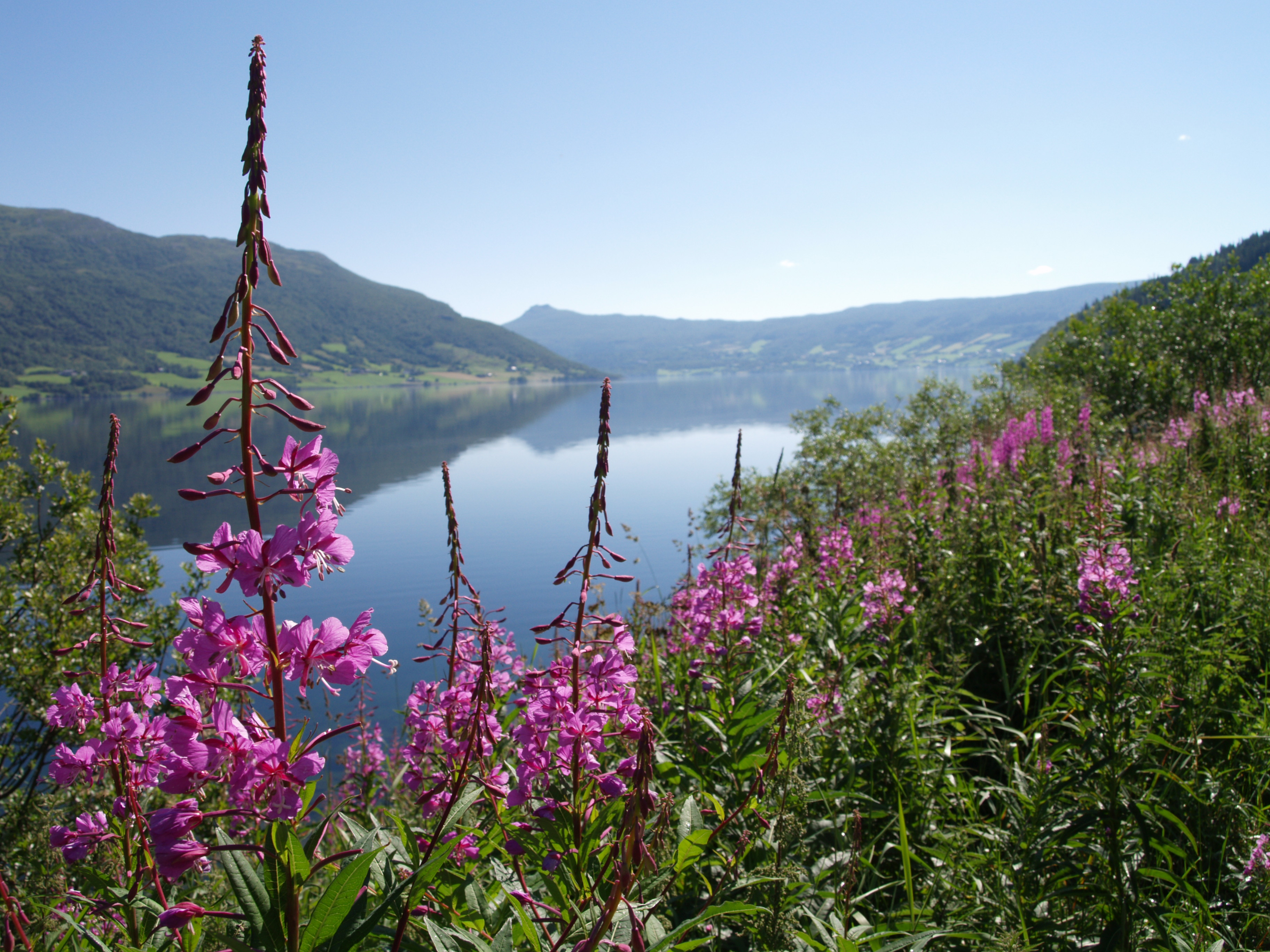
Lake Vangsmjøsa

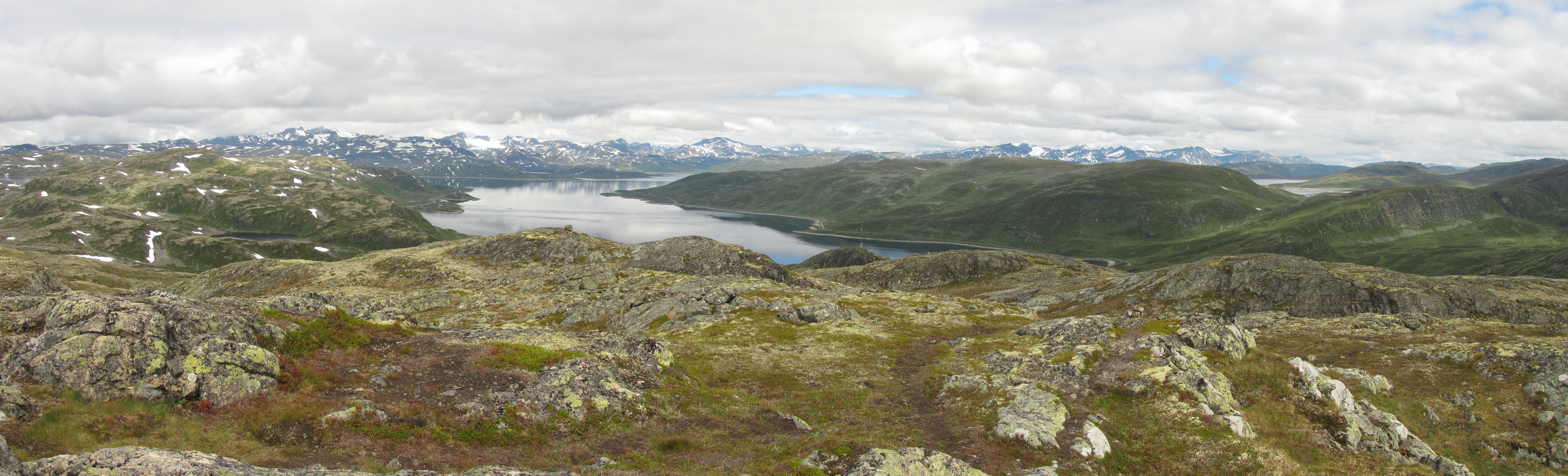
Tyin lake

== Trivia ==
The Veblen and Bunde farmsteads were the homes of the parents of Thorstein Bunde Veblen, from where they emigrated a year before the birth of their son.

== Notable people ==
- Christopher Andreas Holmboe (1796 in Vang – 1882), a philologist, orientalist, and numismatist
- Johannes Belsheim (1829 in Thorpegardane – 1909), a teacher, priest, translator, and biographer
- Nils Nilsen Thune (1880 in Vang – 1950), a jurist and civil servant
- Torstein Høverstad (1880 in Vang – 1959), an educator, teacher educator, school historian, and government scholar
