= Fleinsendin =

Lake in Innlandet, Norway

- Interactive map of the lake
- Location: Vang Municipality, Innlandet
- Coordinates: 61°16′4″N 8°43′10″E
- Basin countries: Norway
- Max. length: 3 kilometres (1.9 mi)
- Max. width: 1.6 kilometres (0.99 mi)
- Surface area: 2.45 km^{2} (0.95 sq mi)
- Max. depth: 29 metres (95 ft)
- Shore length^{1}: 14.57 kilometres (9.05 mi)
- Surface elevation: 950 metres (3,120 ft)
- References: NVE
- ^{1} Shore length is not a well-defined measure.

Fleinsendin is a lake in Vang Municipality in Innlandet county, Norway. The 2.45-square-kilometre (0.95 sq mi) lake lies about 10 kilometres (6.2 mi) west of the village of Beitostølen.

== See also ==
- List of lakes in Norway
