= Vang stone =

11th-century runestone in Norway

Coordinates: 61°07′32″N 8°34′29″E

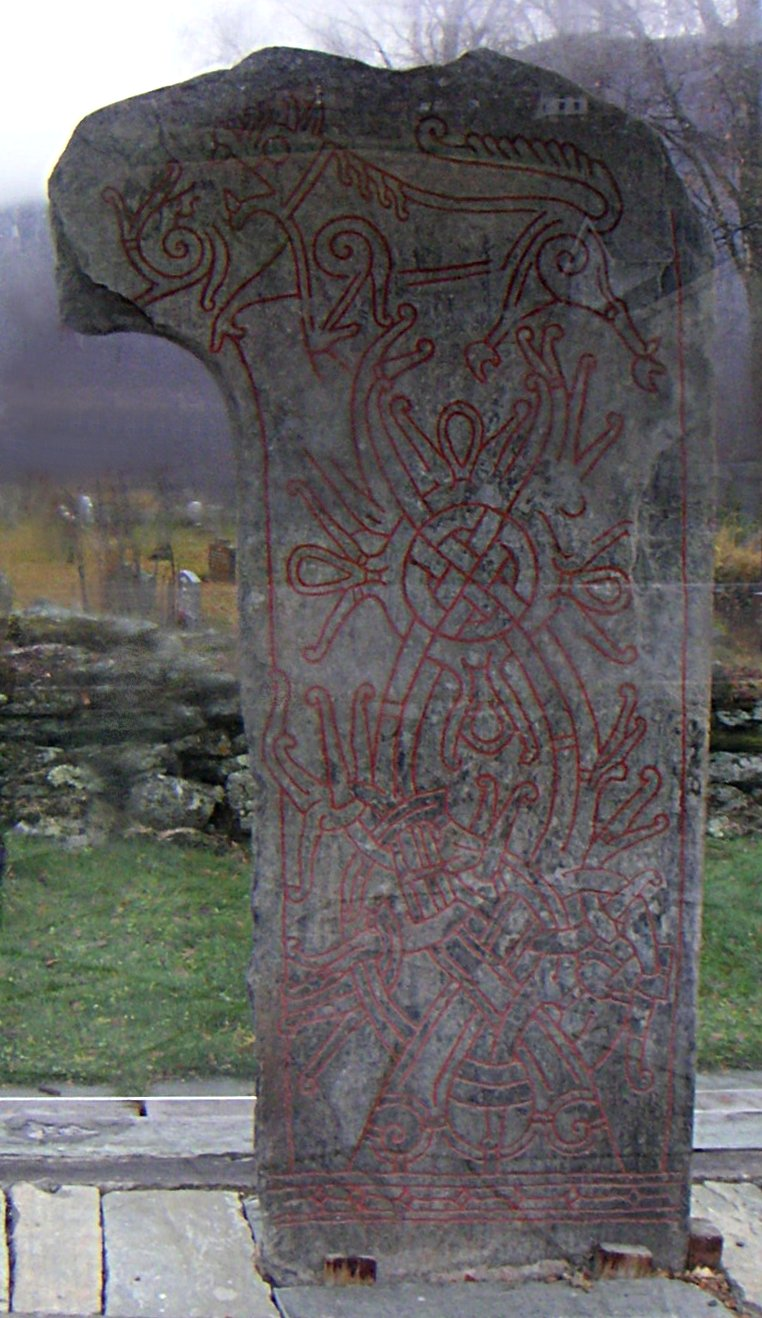
- Created: Eleventh century
- Discovered: Vang Municipality, Innlandet, Norway
- Rundata ID: N 84
- Runemaster: Gása

Vang stone (Vangsteinen) listed as N 84 in Rundata is a runestone from the early eleventh century located at Vang Municipality in Innlandet county, Norway.

== Description ==
The Vang stone was erected around 1000, during the transitional period from Paganism to Christianity in Norway. It was originally located in the traditional district of Valdres. It was situated outside a stave church at Vang. Vang Stave Church was dismantled and moved to Krummhübel, Germany in 1844. At that time, the runestone was moved to its current location, outside the Vang Church (Vang kirke).

The stone is made of an irregular slab of slate. It is 2.15m tall, up to 1.25m wide and 8–13 cm thick. The artwork on the front of the stone is in Ringerike style, and depicts ribbons, leaves and a stylized animal, allegedly a lion. Although thought to be a part of a stone portal, this idea is generally not supported. In contrast to other Viking Age runestones. The runic text is not integrated with the artwork to make a unified composition, but is carved along the edge of the stone.

== Inscription ==
kosa : sunir : ristu : s(t)in : þinsi : af(t)ir : kunar : bruþur:sun
Gása {} synir {} reistu {} stein {} þenna {} eptir {} Gunnar, {} bróðurson.
Gasi's sons raised this stone in memory of Gunnarr, (their) nephew.

== Other sources ==
- Sawyer, Birgit (2003) The Viking-Age Rune-Stones: Custom and Commemoration in Early Medieval Scandinavia (Oxford University Press) ISBN 978-0199262212
- Stocklund, Marie; et al., eds. (2006) Runes and Their Secrets: Studies in Runology (Copenhagen: Museum Tusculanum Press) ISBN 978-87-635-0627-4
