= Heensåsen Church =

Church in Innlandet, Norway

- Heensåsen kirke
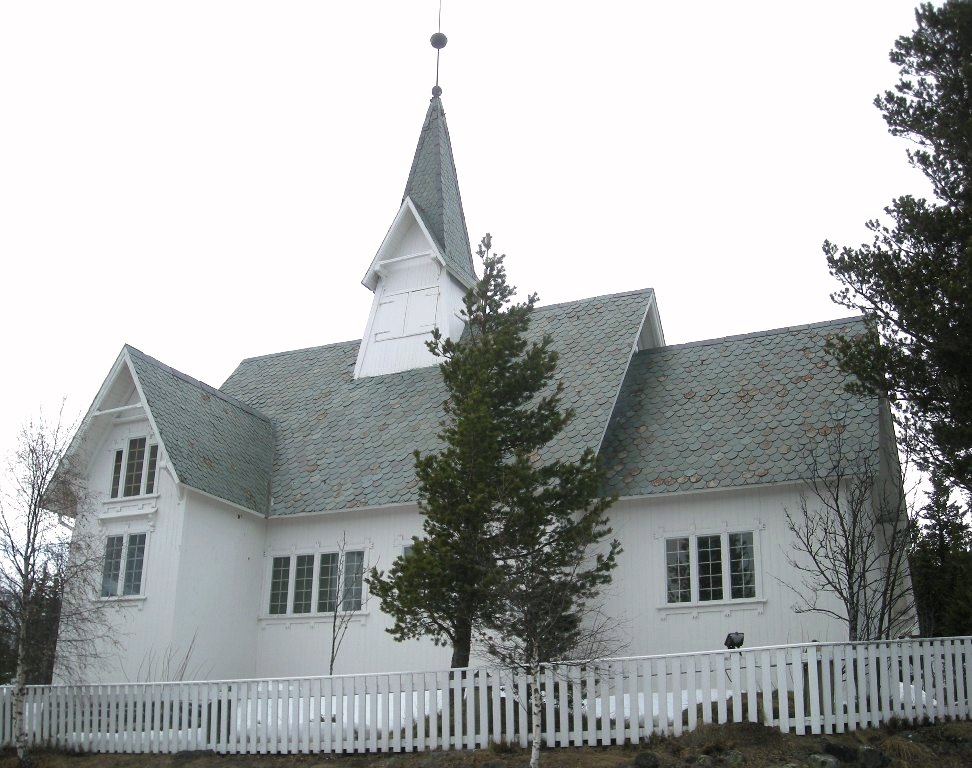
- View of the church
- Heensåsen Church
- 61°10′13″N 8°41′42″E
- Location: Vang Municipality, Innlandet
- Country: Norway
- Denomination: Church of Norway
- Churchmanship: Evangelical Lutheran

History
- Status: Parish church
- Founded: 1902
- Consecrated: 17 September 1902

Architecture
- Functional status: Active
- Architect: Johan Meyer
- Architectural type: Long church
- Completed: 1902 (124 years ago)

Specifications
- Capacity: 200
- Materials: Wood

Administration
- Diocese: Hamar bispedømme
- Deanery: Valdres prosti
- Parish: Heensåsen
- Norwegian Cultural Heritage Site
- Type: Church
- Status: Protected
- ID: 84553

Heensåsen Church (Norwegian: Heensåsen kirke) is a parish church of the Church of Norway in Vang Municipality in Innlandet county, Norway. It is located in the village of Hænsgardane. It is the church for the Heensåsen parish which is part of the Valdres prosti (deanery) in the Diocese of Hamar. The white, wooden church was built in a long church design in 1902 using plans drawn up by the architect Johan Meyer. The church seats about 200 people.

== History ==
At the beginning of the 20th century, work began on a new annex chapel at Hænsgardane. Johan Meyer was hired to design the building and Erik Eriksen was hired as the lead builder. The building was consecrated on 17 September 1902. Later it was upgraded from a chapel to parish church status.

== See also ==
- List of churches in Hamar
