= St. Thomas Church, Filefjell =

Church in Innlandet, Norway

St. Thomas Church
- St. Tomaskyrkja
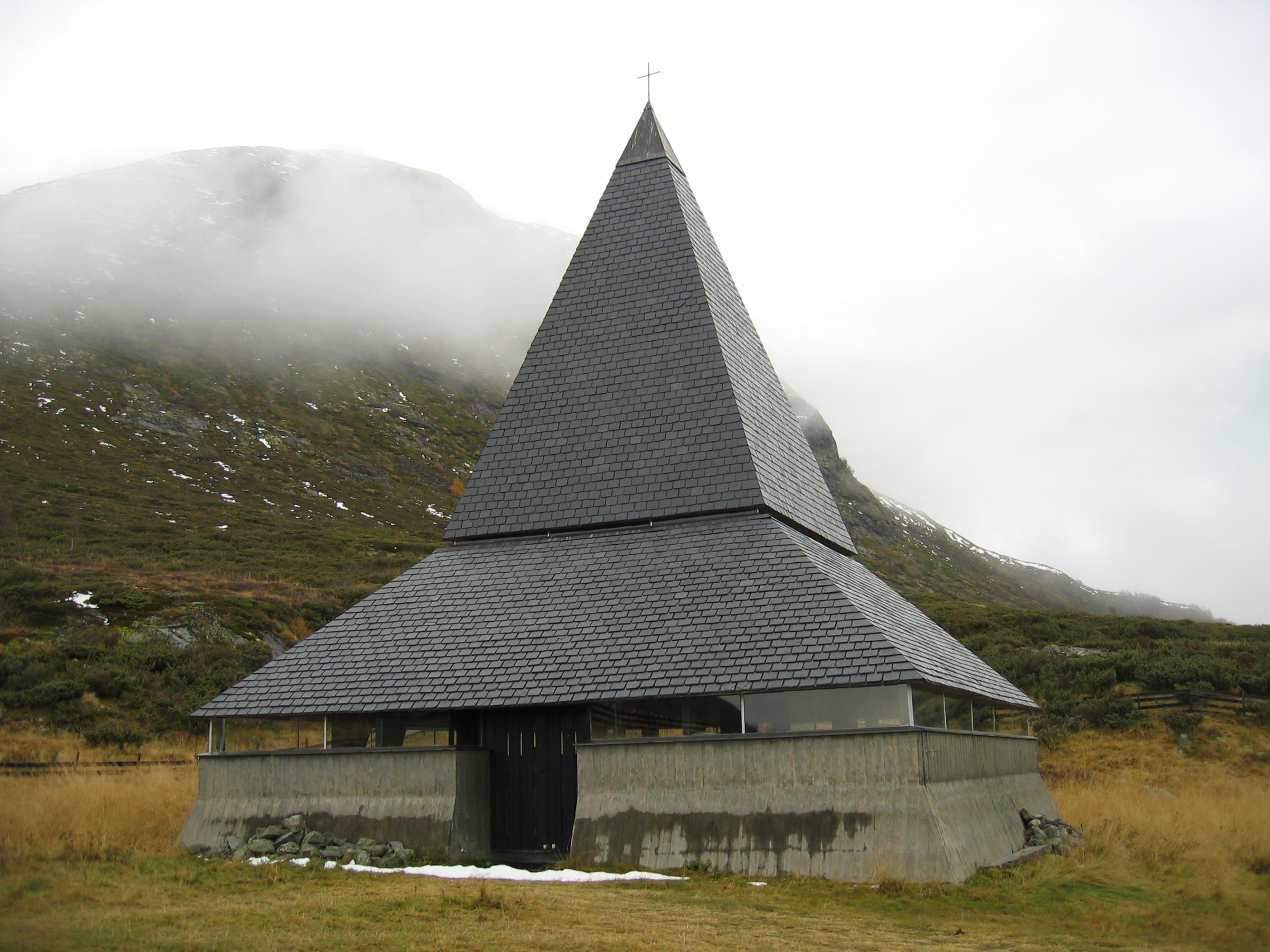
- View of the church
- St. Thomas Church
- 61°10′48″N 8°07′08″E
- Location: Vang Municipality, Innlandet
- Country: Norway
- Denomination: Church of Norway
- Previous denomination: Catholic Church
- Churchmanship: Evangelical Lutheran

History
- Status: Parish church
- Founded: 12th-century
- Consecrated: 2 July 1971

Architecture
- Functional status: Active
- Architect: Claus Lindstrøm
- Architectural type: Rectangular
- Completed: 1971 (55 years ago)
- Closed: 1808-1971

Specifications
- Capacity: 120
- Materials: Concrete

Administration
- Diocese: Hamar bispedømme
- Deanery: Valdres prosti
- Parish: Øye
- Norwegian Cultural Heritage Site
- Type: Church
- Status: Not protected
- ID: 51238

St. Thomas Church (Norwegian: St. Tomaskyrkja) is a parish church of the Church of Norway in Vang Municipality in Innlandet county, Norway. It is located in the Filefjell area of Vang. It is one of the churches for the Øye parish which is part of the Valdres prosti (deanery) in the Diocese of Hamar. The concrete and wood church was built in a rectangular design in 1971 using plans drawn up by the architect Claus Lindstrøm. The church seats about 120 people.

== History ==
A church was built in the Filefjell area of Vang around the years 1180-1200. The church was a wooden stave church with about 100 seats. The church was named after Thomas Becket who was killed in England in 1170. It is speculated that it may have been a parish church for people who engaged in iron mining in the area. According to tradition, the church was left desolate after the Reformation, but it is also said that Thue Anchesen Bahr, who was parish priest in Vang from 1615–1620, persuaded the local people to restore the church. After that time, it was an annex church to the main Vang Church. The church attracted travelers and provided shelter to those who traveled over the mountain pass. People from all over the country came to be healed (avoid difficult births, illness, get forgiveness of sins, and so on). For this reason, there was a lot of unrest around the church and disturbances for the priests who held mass at the church. As early as 1747, the bishop had proposed that it be closed down. On 24 June 1808, the government approved the demolition of the old church, and this was carried out soon afterwards.

In the early 20th century, an initiative was taken to build a new church about 20 metres (66 ft) east of the old church site. The foundation stone was laid in 1922 for a stone church that had been designed by Olaf Due. Finances and disputes over building materials led to many postponements and changes to plans by various architects. It is said that the Nazis showed interest in church building, and that it deterred others from working for it. In the 1960s, new drawings were prepared by Claus Lindstrøm, and the foundation stone was laid in 1970. The church has a square floor plan and a pyramid-shaped roof. The church was consecrated on 2 July 1971.

== Media gallery ==
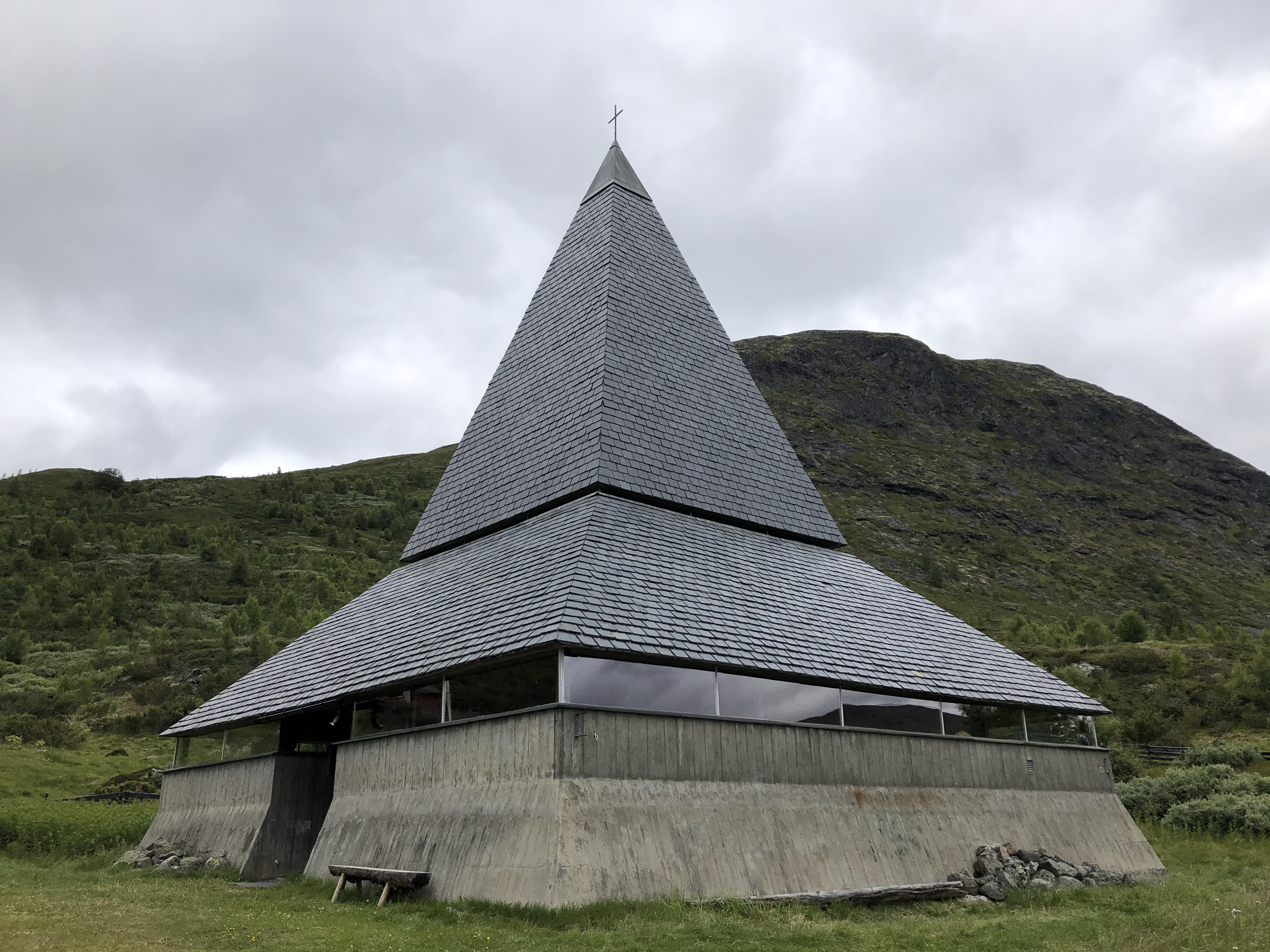

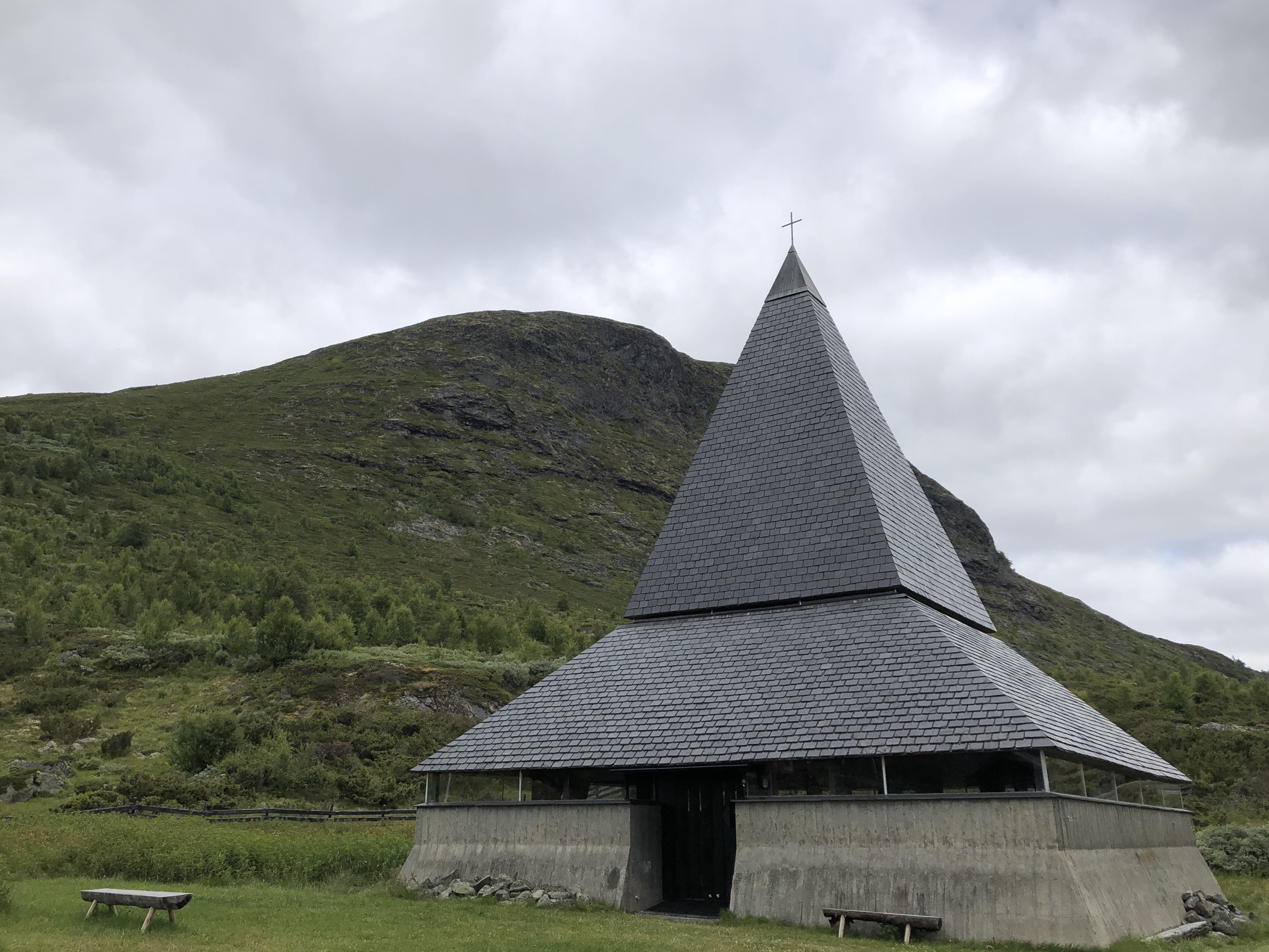

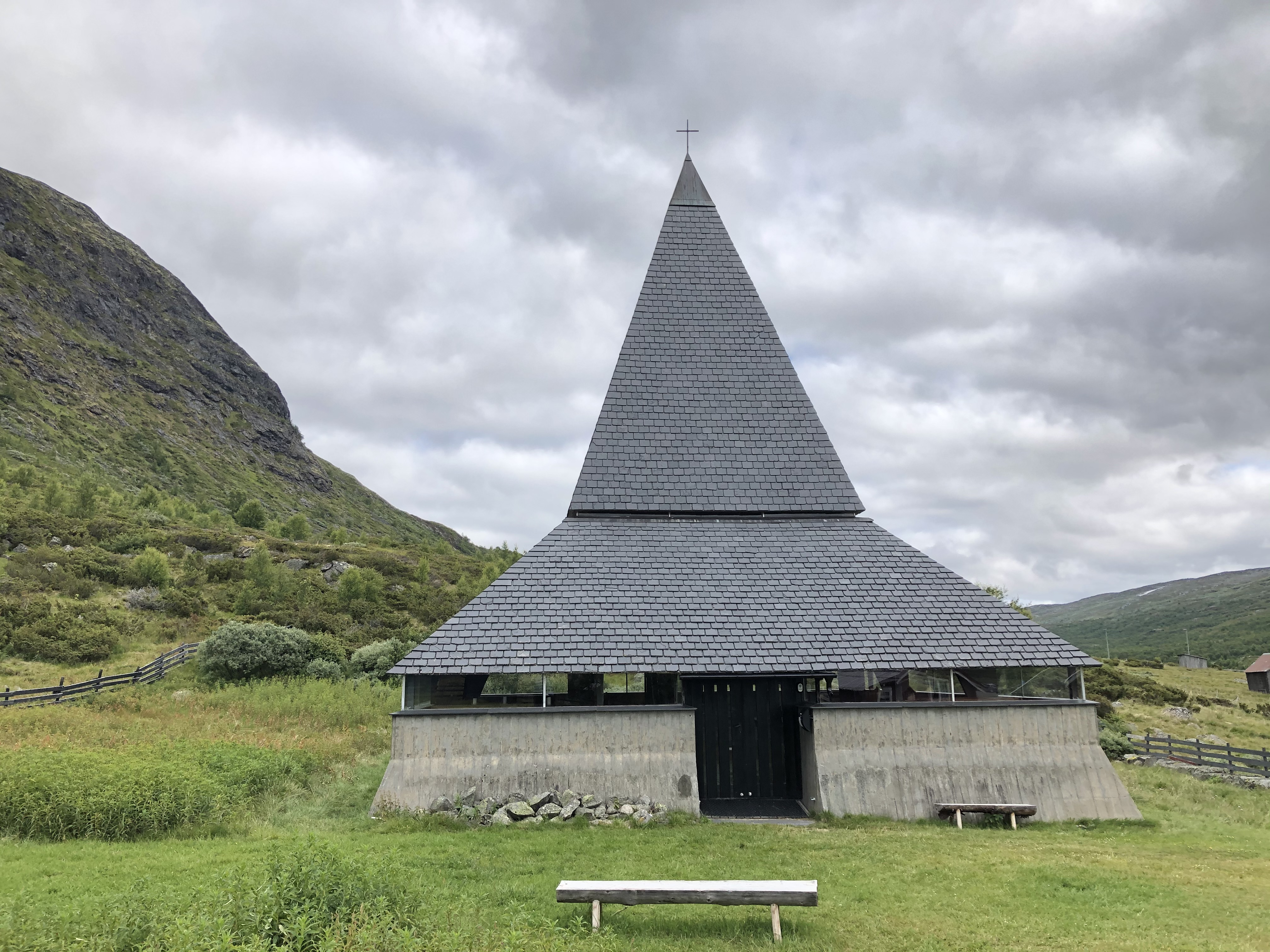

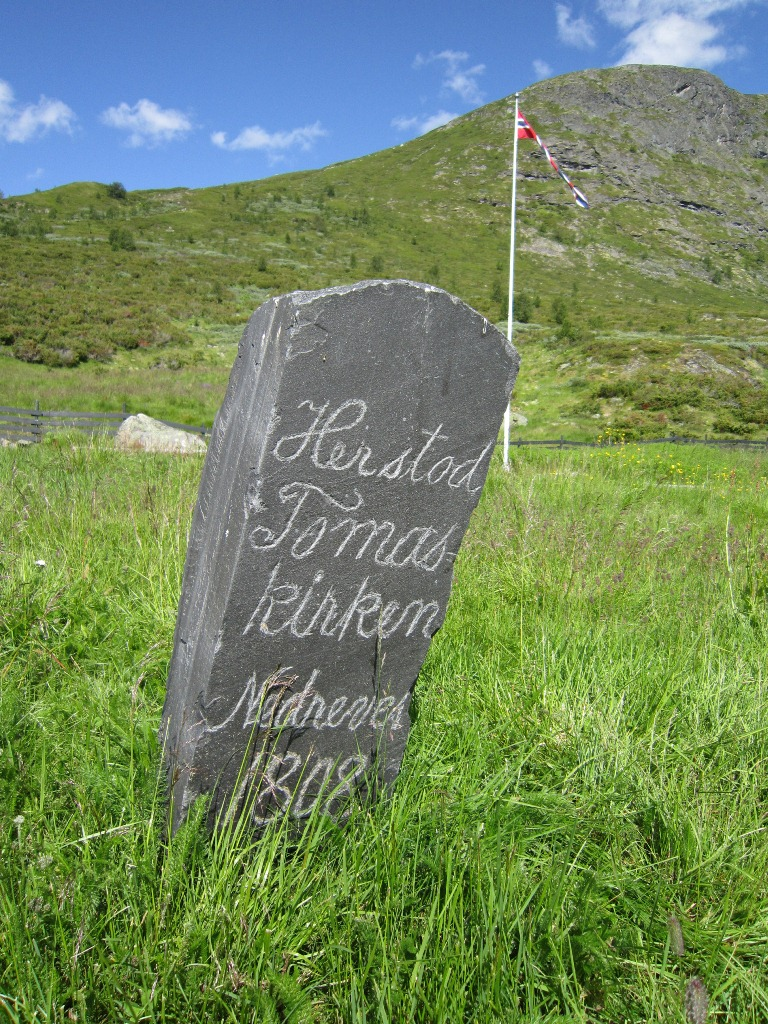

== See also ==
- List of churches in Hamar
