= Hensgardane =

Village in Vang Municipality, Norway

Hensgardane Hænsgardane
- Village
- Interactive map of Hensgardane
- Location within Innlandet Location within Norway
- Coordinates: 61.16791°N 8.67677°E
- Country: Norway
- Region: Eastern Norway
- County: Innlandet
- District: Valdres
- Municipality: Vang Municipality
- Elevation: 608 m (1,995 ft)
- Time zone: UTC+01:00 (CET)
  - Summer (DST): UTC+02:00 (CEST)
- Post Code: 2975 Vang i Valdres

Hensgardane is a village in Vang Municipality in Innlandet county, Norway. The village is located on a hillside, just east of the eastern end of the lake Vangsmjøse, about 8 kilometres (5.0 mi) to the northeast of the village of Vang i Valdres and about the same distance to the northwest of the village of Ryfoss. Heensåsen Church is located in the village.
