= Høre Stave Church =

Church in Innlandet, Norway

- Høre stavkyrkje
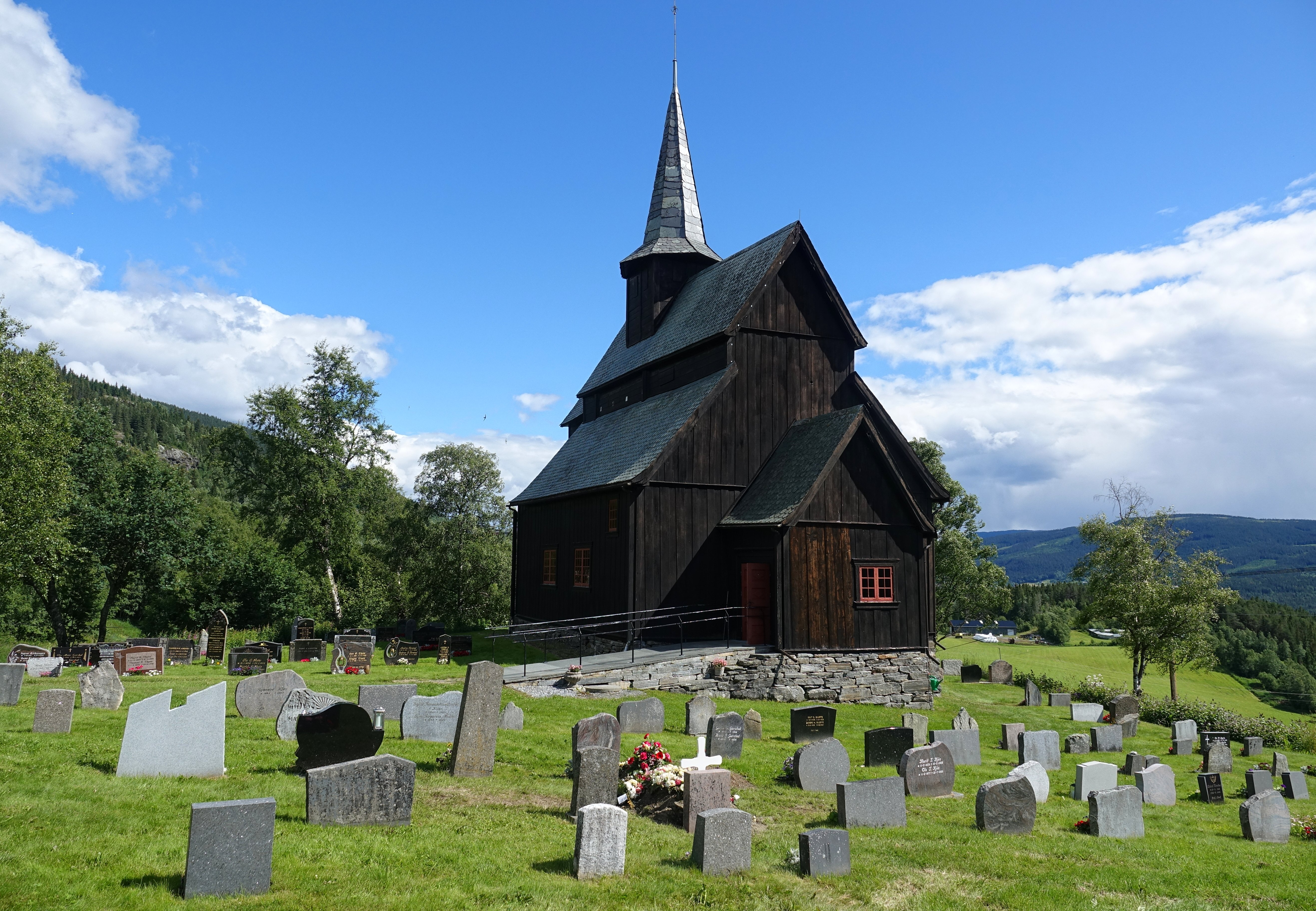
- View of the church
- Høre Stave Church
- 61°09′11″N 8°48′17″E
- Location: Vang Municipality, Innlandet
- Country: Norway
- Denomination: Church of Norway
- Previous denomination: Catholic Church
- Churchmanship: Evangelical Lutheran

History
- Status: Parish church
- Founded: 11th century
- Consecrated: 1179

Architecture
- Functional status: Active
- Architectural type: Long church
- Completed: 1179 (847 years ago)

Specifications
- Capacity: 170
- Materials: Wood

Administration
- Diocese: Hamar bispedømme
- Deanery: Valdres prosti
- Parish: Høre
- Norwegian Cultural Heritage Site
- Type: Church
- Status: Automatically protected
- ID: 84696

Høre Stave Church (Norwegian: Høre stavkyrkje) is a parish church of the Church of Norway in Vang Municipality in Innlandet county, Norway. It is located in the village of Kvien. It is the church for the Høre parish which is part of the Valdres prosti (deanery) in the Diocese of Hamar. The brown, wooden church was built in a long church design around the year 1179 using plans drawn up by an unknown architect. The church seats about 170 people.

== History ==
The earliest existing historical records of the church date back to the year 1327, but the church was not built that year. The first Høre church was a wooden post church (a church with earth-bound posts standing directly on the ground) that was built in the 11th century. Over 100 years later, around the year 1179, the old church was torn down and a new wooden stave church was constructed on roughly the same site. The new church had a long church design. Through a dendrochronological study of the church, the wood is dated to the years 1178-1179. A runic inscription upon the medieval pulpit reads: "Þá, um þat sumar [létu] þeir brœðr Erlingr ok Auðun hôggva till kirkju þessar, er Erlingr ja[rl fe]ll í Niðarósi" which translates to The brothers Erling and Audun had the timber for this church felled, the summer that Erling Jarl fell in Nidaros. This refers to the Battle of Kalvskinnet in 1179, which supports the dendrochronological evidence that the church was built in 1179. There are also several other runic inscriptions, and items with runic inscriptions in the church. There are also a number of graves under the church, including those of children, some of which pre-date the present church which lends support to the fact that a previous church stood on roughly the same site before the present church. Over the years, the church was repaired several times including in the 1660s, 1680s, 1724, and 1740.

In 1822, the church was significantly renovated and expanded. The work was led by builder Ole J. Ulen from Slidre. During this project, the old choir was torn down and a new, larger choir was built. Also, the nave was lengthened by extending it towards west. It was also widened by taking the old open-air corridors that once surrounded the church and incorporating them into the north and south sides of the nave. In 1857, the old rooftop was taken down and a new tower was built on a reinforced construction over the ceiling. There was another extensive restoration and rebuilding in 1888-1889. The exterior walls received paneled siding to cover the log building construction. The church also received a sacristy addition and a new slate roof. In 1970, the church was restored under the leadership of Bjarne Hvoslef. In 1952, the floors were taken up and rot-damaged wood was removed and replaced with new materials. In 1979, the floors were once again sagging so the floors were again taken up and repaired. During this work, archaeological investigations were also carried out. The excavation uncovered artifacts including 357 coins. The oldest of the coins dates back to a period 1042–1047.

== Media gallery ==
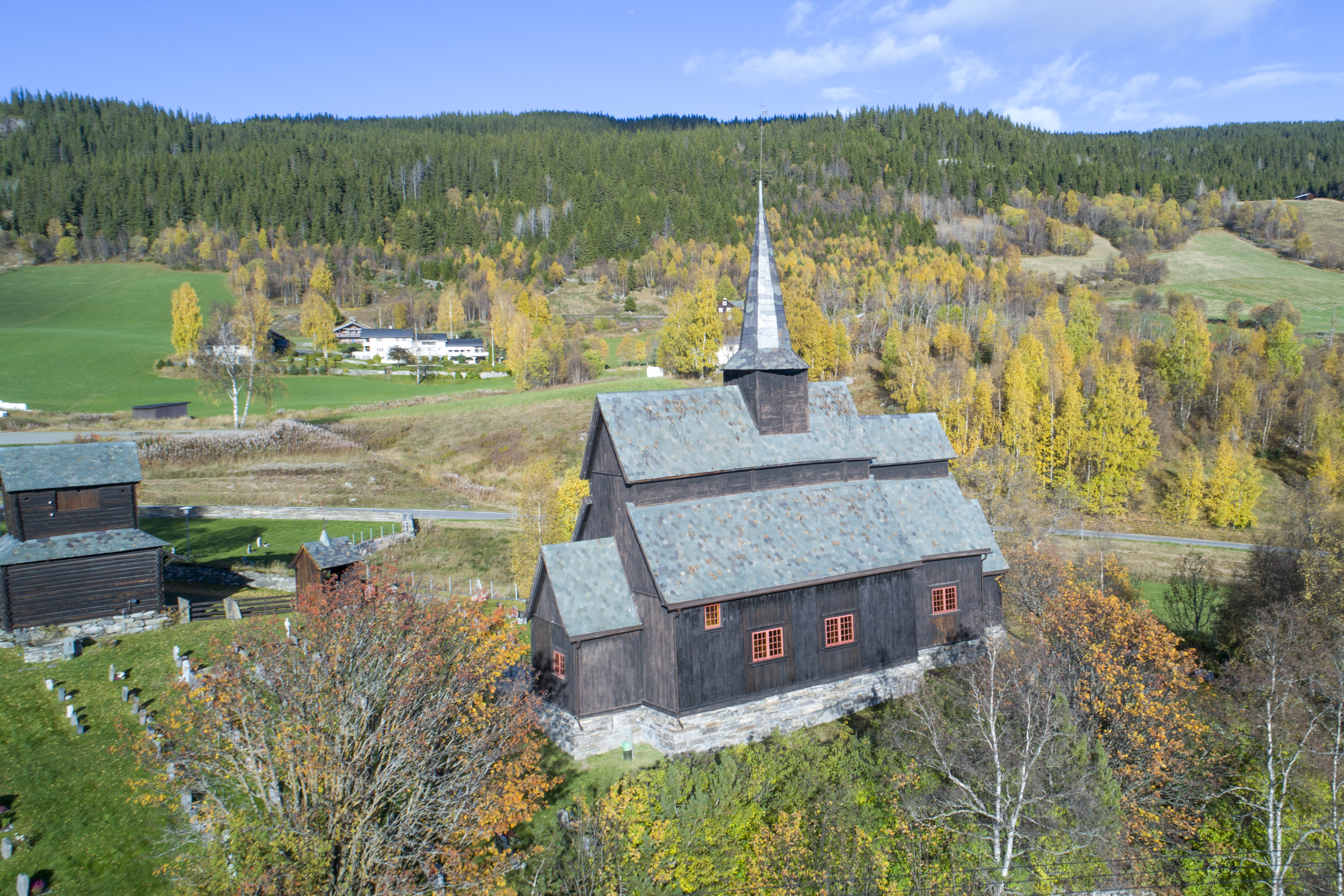

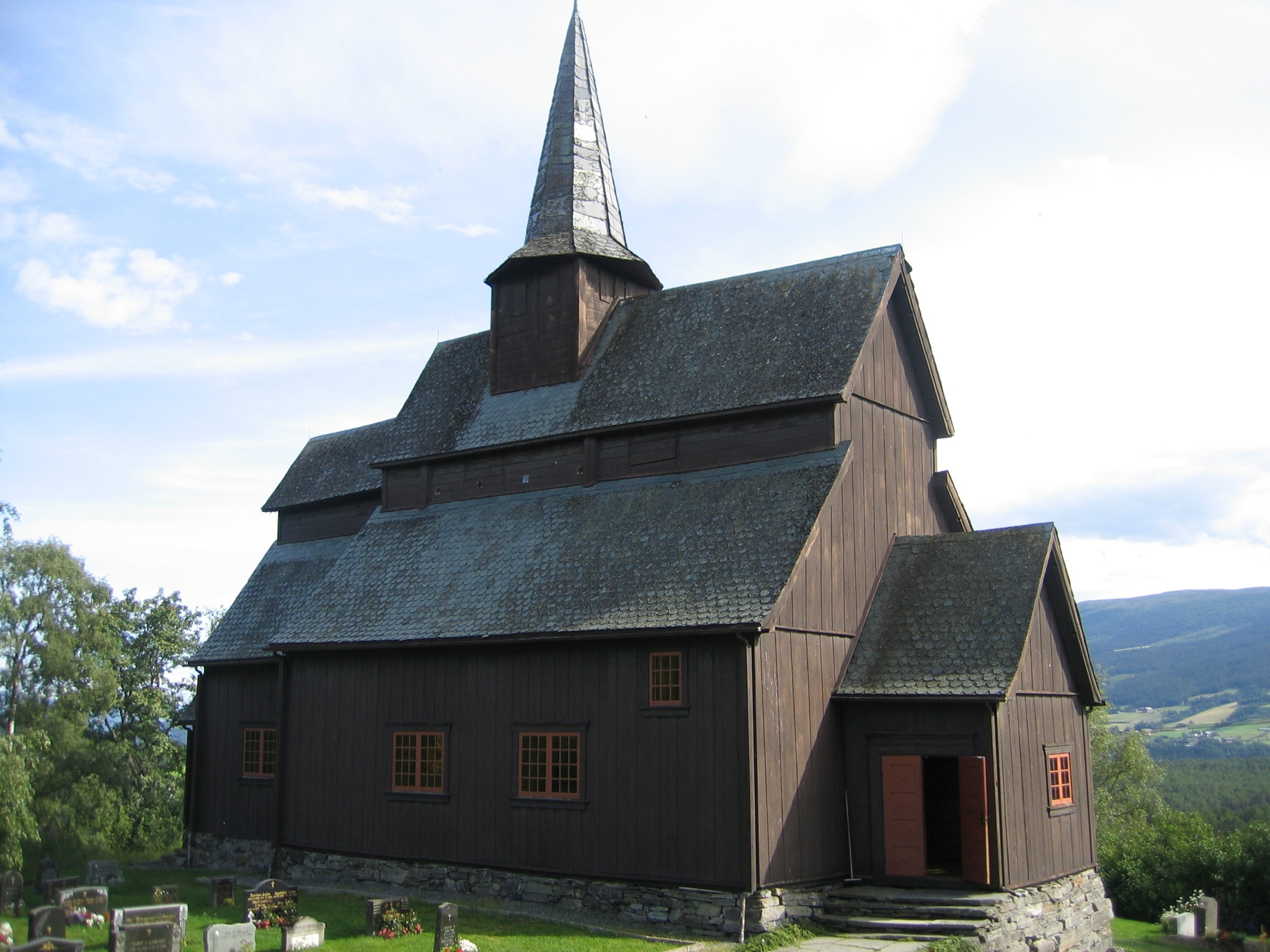

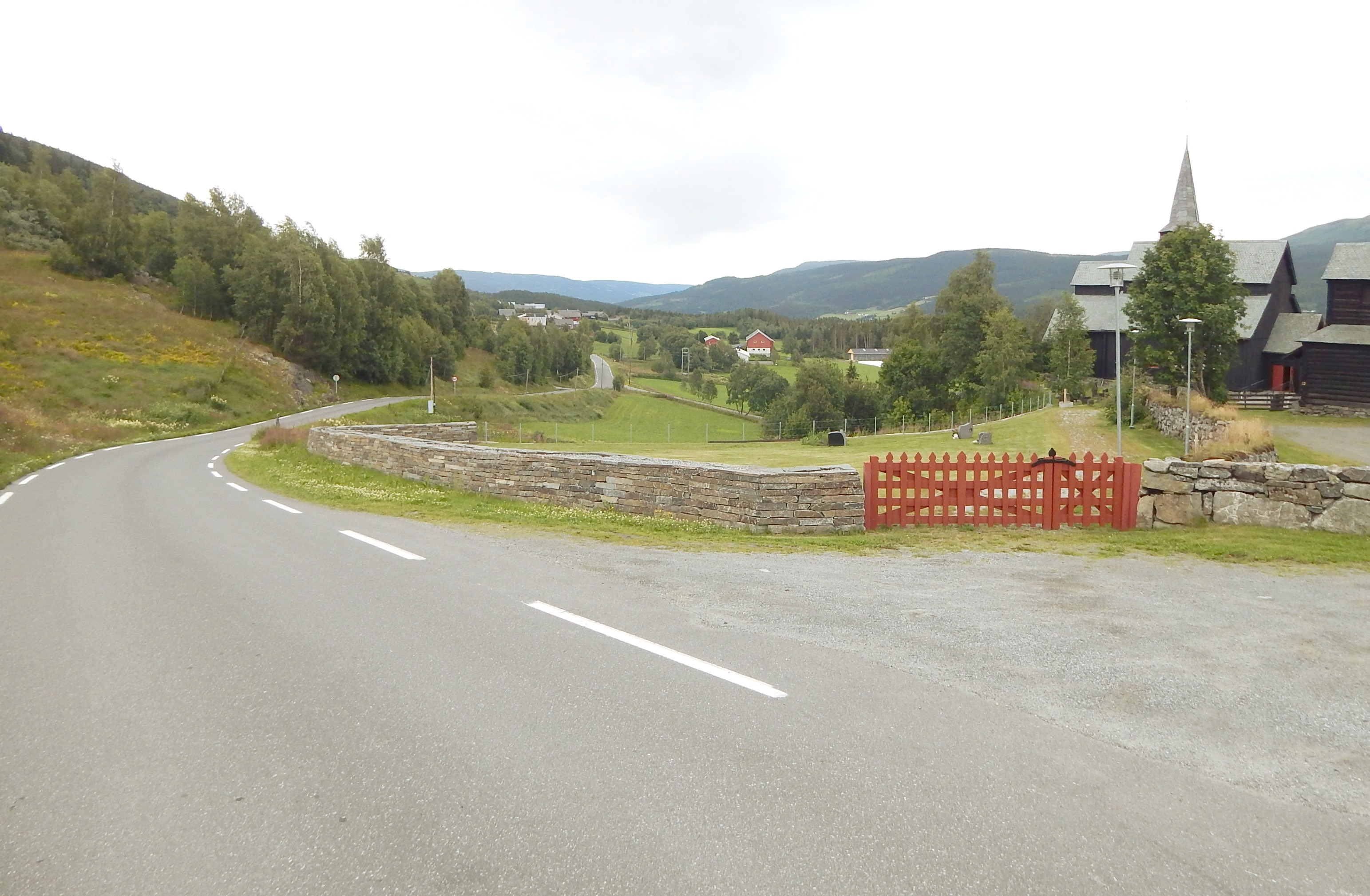

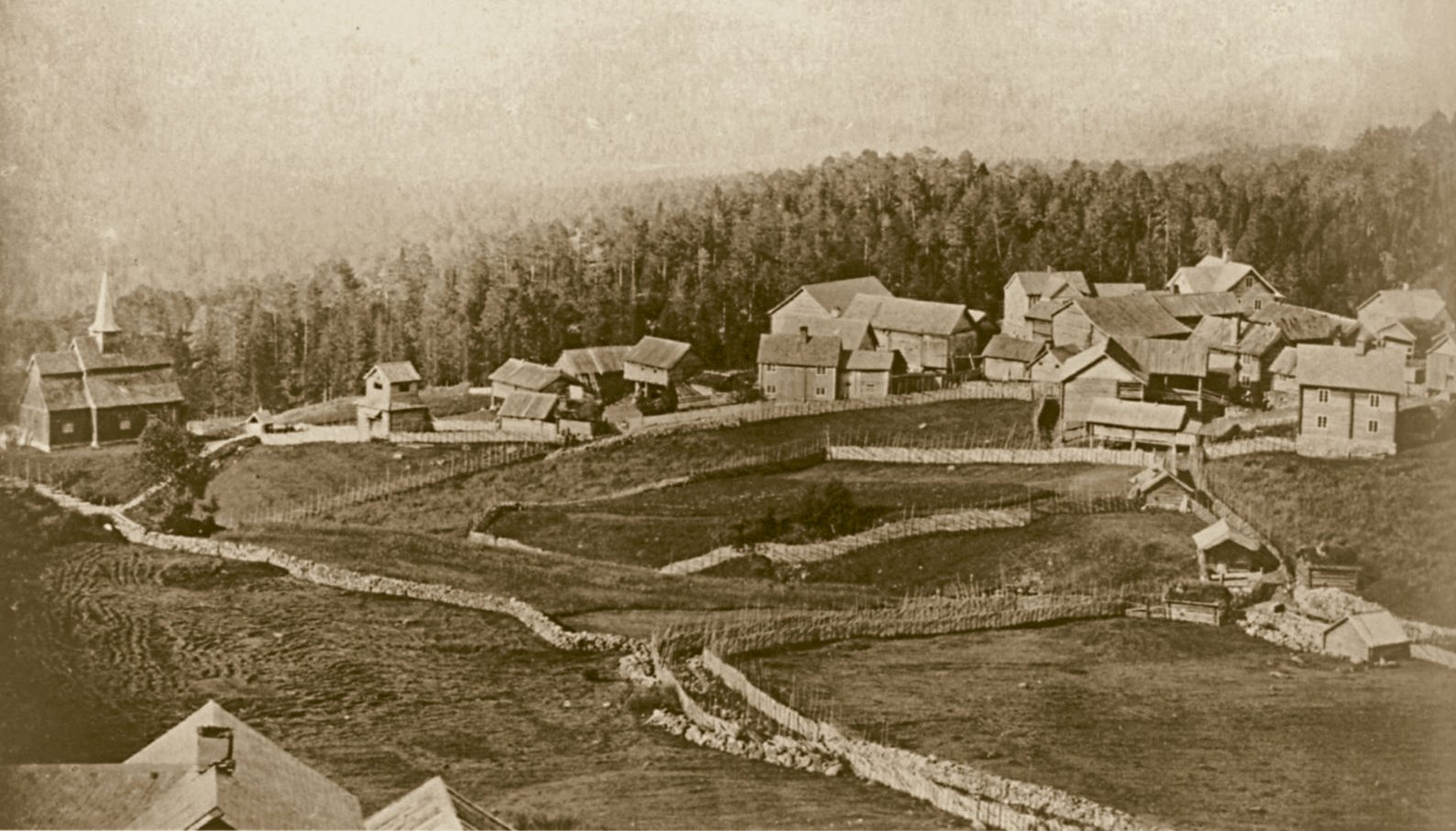

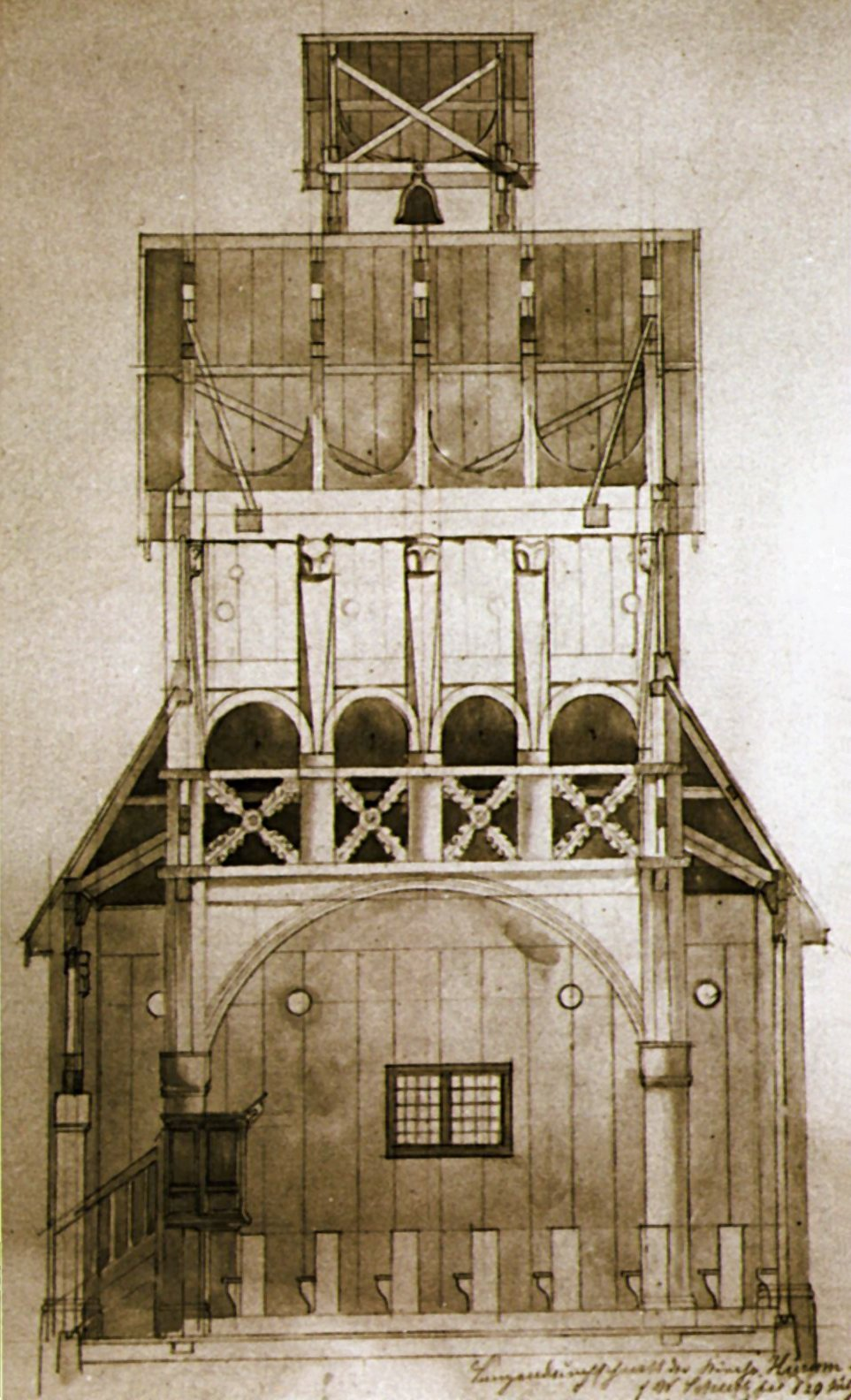

== See also ==
- List of churches in Hamar

== Related reading ==
- Anker, Leif (2005). The Norwegian Stave Churches. Oslo: Arfo Forlag. ISBN 978-8291399294.
