= Tyinkrysset =

Village in Vang Municipality, Norway

- Village
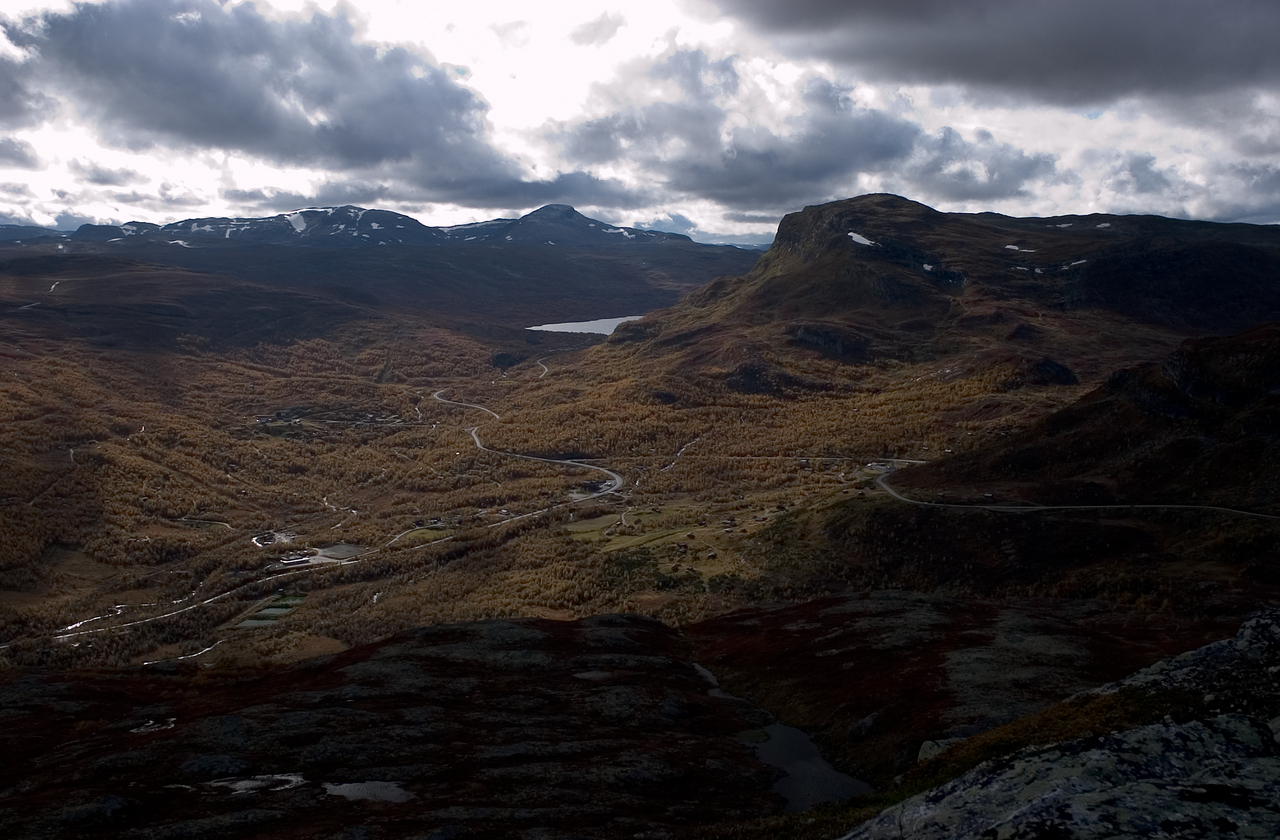
- View of the village area
- Interactive map of Tyinkrysset
- Location within Innlandet Location within Norway
- Coordinates: 61.20161°N 8.23439°E
- Country: Norway
- Region: Eastern Norway
- County: Innlandet
- District: Valdres
- Municipality: Vang Municipality
- Elevation: 900 m (3,000 ft)
- Time zone: UTC+01:00 (CET)
  - Summer (DST): UTC+02:00 (CEST)
- Post Code: 2985 Tyinkrysset

Tyinkrysset is a village in Vang Municipality in Innlandet county, Norway. The village is located in the Filefjell mountains, just a short distance south of the lake Tyin. The village of Øye lies about 10 kilometres (6.2 mi) to the southeast of this village. The village sits at an elevation of about 900 metres (3,000 ft) above sea level.

The European route E16 highway passes through Tyinkrysset, connecting Innlandet county with Lærdal Municipality to the west. Also, the Norwegian County Road 53 heads north from the village towards Årdal Municipality. Many mountain-climbers enjoy this area as it has few inhabitants and has many mountain climbing and hiking opportunities. There is a hotel in the village as well as many holiday cottages.
