= Vang Church (Vang) =

Church in Innlandet, Norway

- Vang kyrkje
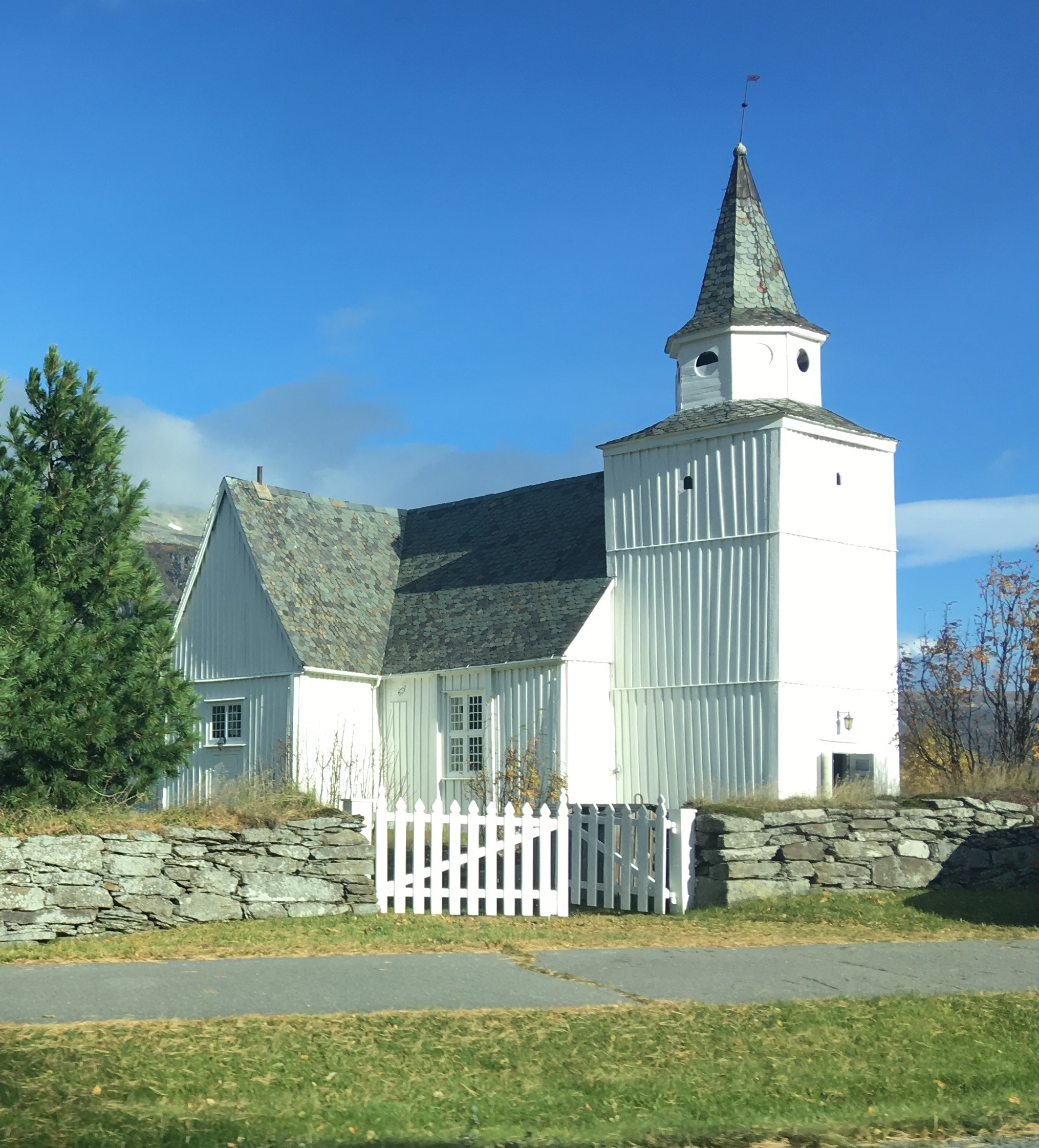
- View of the church
- Vang Church
- 61°07′33″N 8°34′31″E
- Location: Vang Municipality, Innlandet
- Country: Norway
- Denomination: Church of Norway
- Previous denomination: Catholic Church
- Churchmanship: Evangelical Lutheran

History
- Status: Parish church
- Founded: 12th century
- Consecrated: 9 April 1840

Architecture
- Functional status: Active
- Architect: Hans Linstow
- Architectural type: Cruciform
- Completed: 1839 (187 years ago)

Specifications
- Capacity: 250
- Materials: Wood

Administration
- Diocese: Hamar bispedømme
- Deanery: Valdres prosti
- Parish: Vang
- Norwegian Cultural Heritage Site
- Type: Church
- Status: Automatically protected
- ID: 85760

Vang Church (Norwegian: Vang kyrkje) is a parish church of the Church of Norway in Vang Municipality in Innlandet county, Norway. It is located in the village of Vang i Valdres, on the shore of the lake Vangsmjøse. It is the church for the Vang parish which is part of the Valdres prosti (deanery) in the Diocese of Hamar. The white, wooden church was built in a cruciform design in 1839 using plans drawn up by the architect Hans Linstow. The church seats about 250 people.

== History ==
The earliest existing historical records of the church date back to the year 1341, but the church was not new that year. The first church in Vang was a wooden stave church that was likely built in the late 1100s, possibly around 1180. The church was fairly small, measuring about 36 by 36 feet (11 m × 11 m). It had a rectangular nave with a smaller, narrower chancel. There was an open-air corridor around the church which were removed in the 1600s or 1700s.

In 1814, this church served as an election church (Norwegian: valgkirke). Together with more than 300 other parish churches across Norway, it was a polling station for elections to the 1814 Norwegian Constituent Assembly which wrote the Constitution of Norway. This was Norway's first national elections. Each church parish was a constituency that elected people called "electors" who later met together in each county to elect the representatives for the assembly that was to meet at Eidsvoll Manor later that year.

In 1832, the parish started planning to replace the centuries-old church because it was in poor condition and too small for the congregation. Plans were drawn up by the architect Hans Linstow. The parish priest in Vang had complained about the smell in the cemetery, and so it was decided to place the new church a little further to the northwest of the old church site. The new building was a wooden cruciform church. The construction took place in 1839 and the new building was consecrated on 9 April 1840. In 1841, the old church (which was still standing next to the new building) was disassembled and put up for auction. The famous artist, Johan Christian Dahl bought the materials to save some of the historic art and carvings from destruction. Dahl unsuccessfully tried to get the old church to be rebuilt elsewhere in Norway. After some controversy, he sold them to King Frederick William IV of Prussia who had a residence in the Giant Mountains at Brückenberg in Silesia (now part of Poland). The King bought the materials and moved them to Brückenberg where it would be rebuilt and used for the local congregation there where it is now known as Vang Stave Church. The newly rebuilt church is not an exact replica of the old church at Vang. This is the only medieval Norwegian stave church to be moved out of the country. The newly rebuilt church was consecrated in 1844.

== Media gallery ==
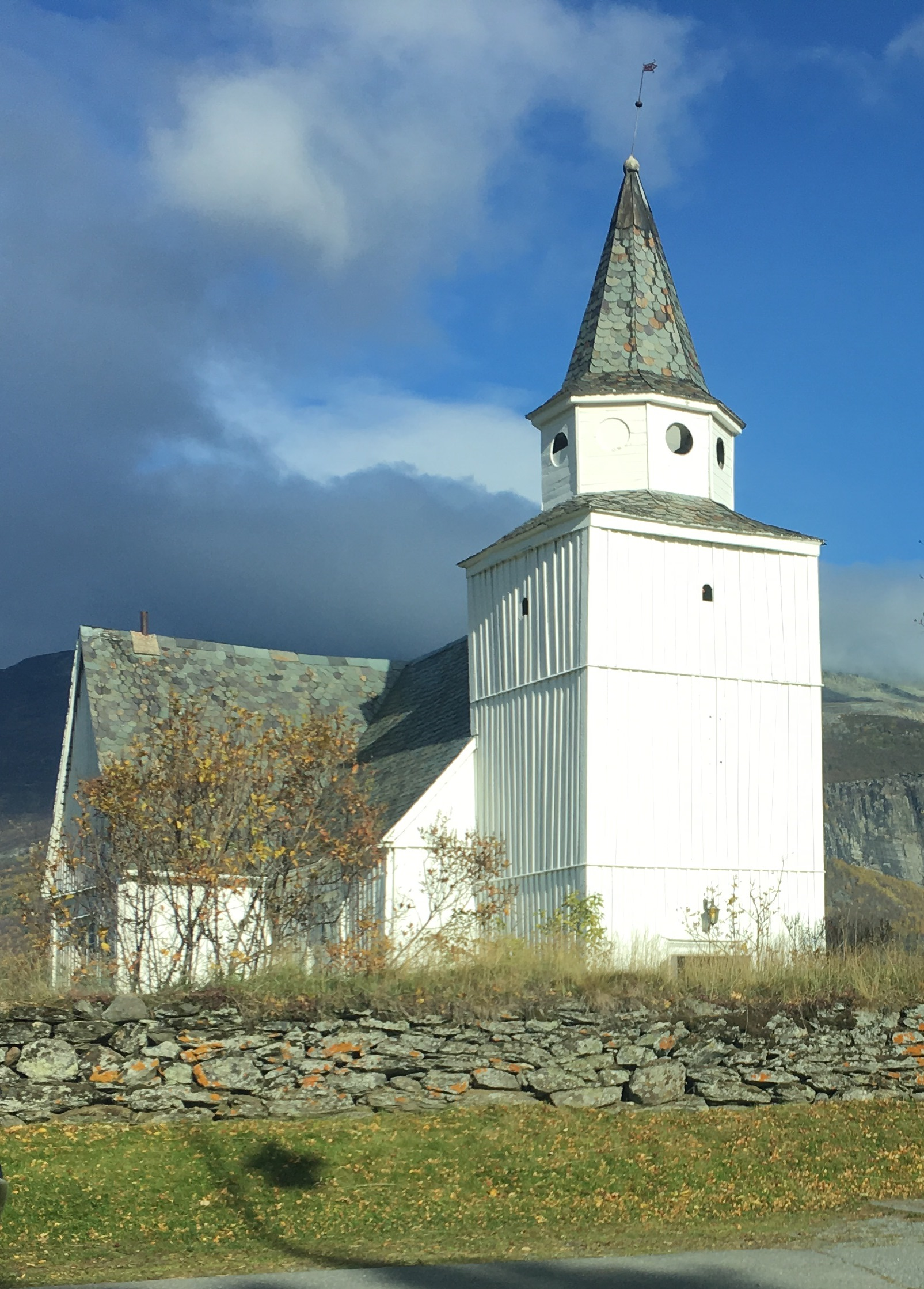

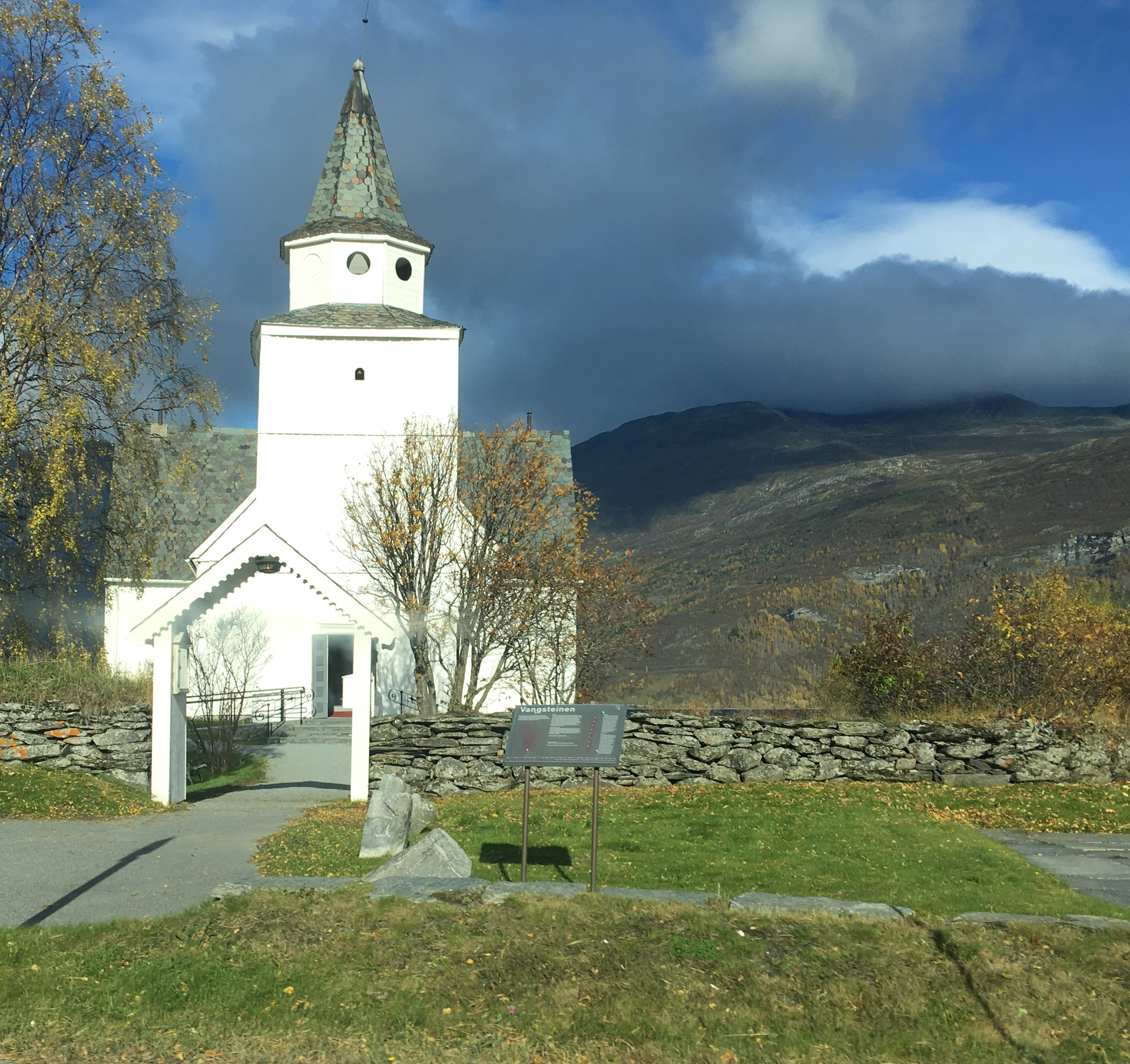

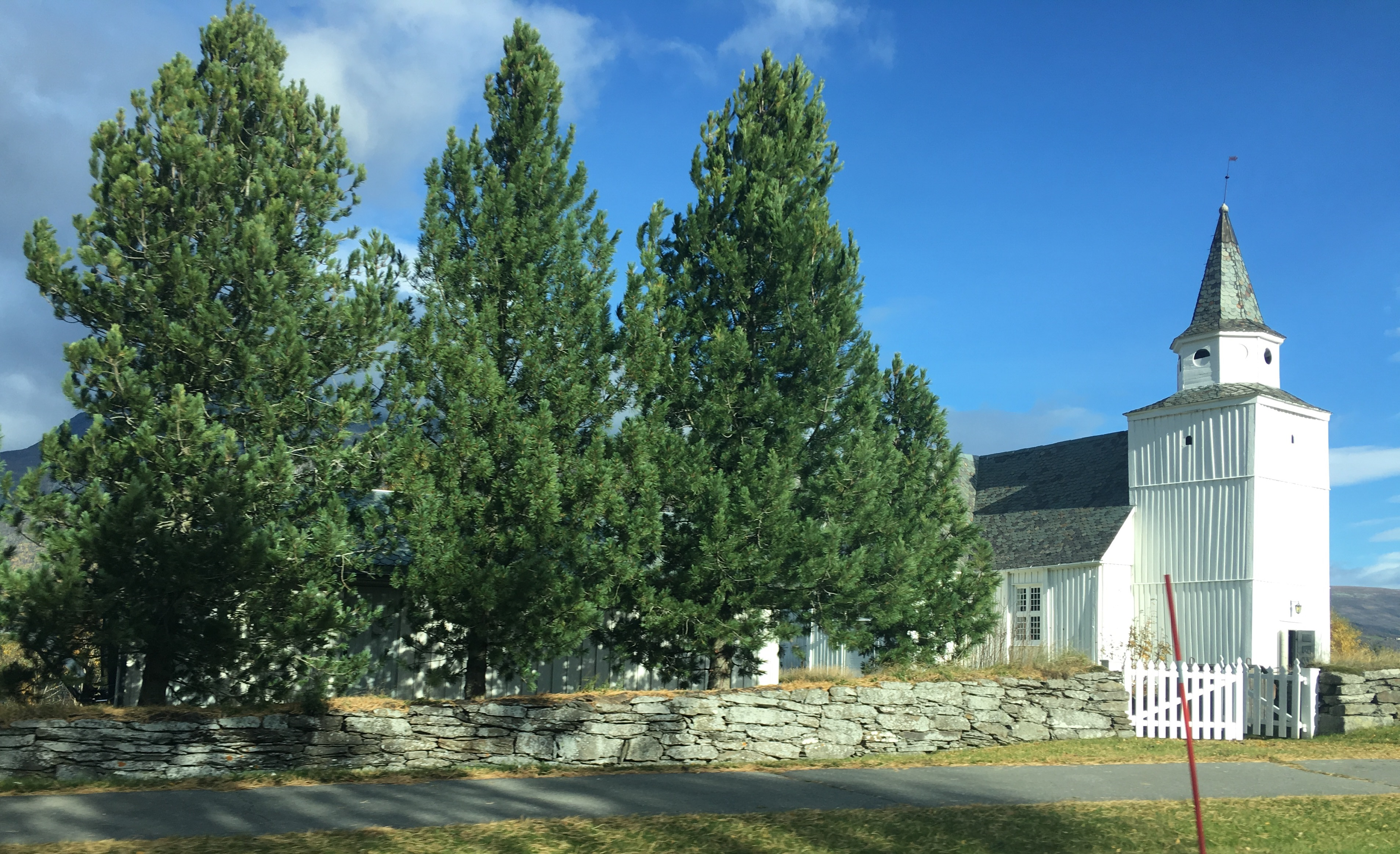

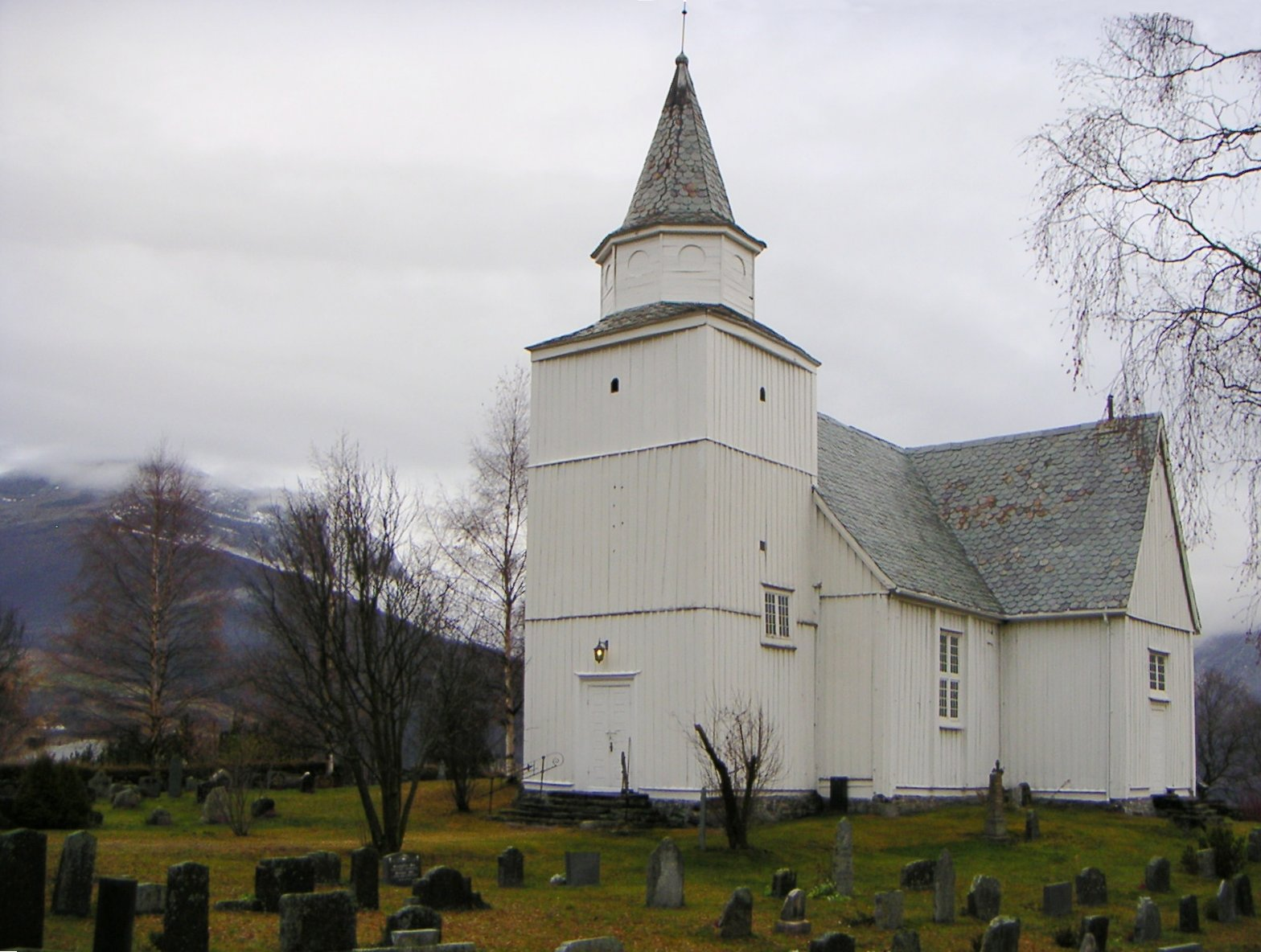

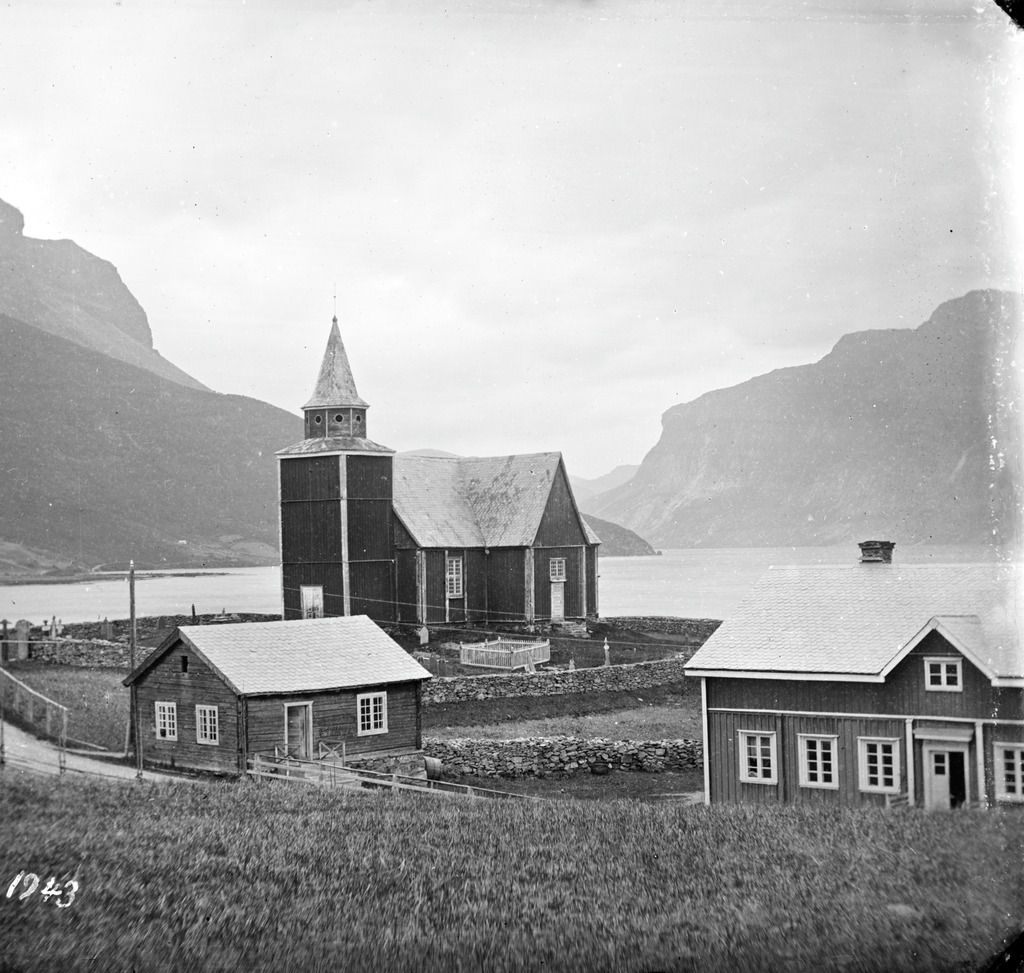

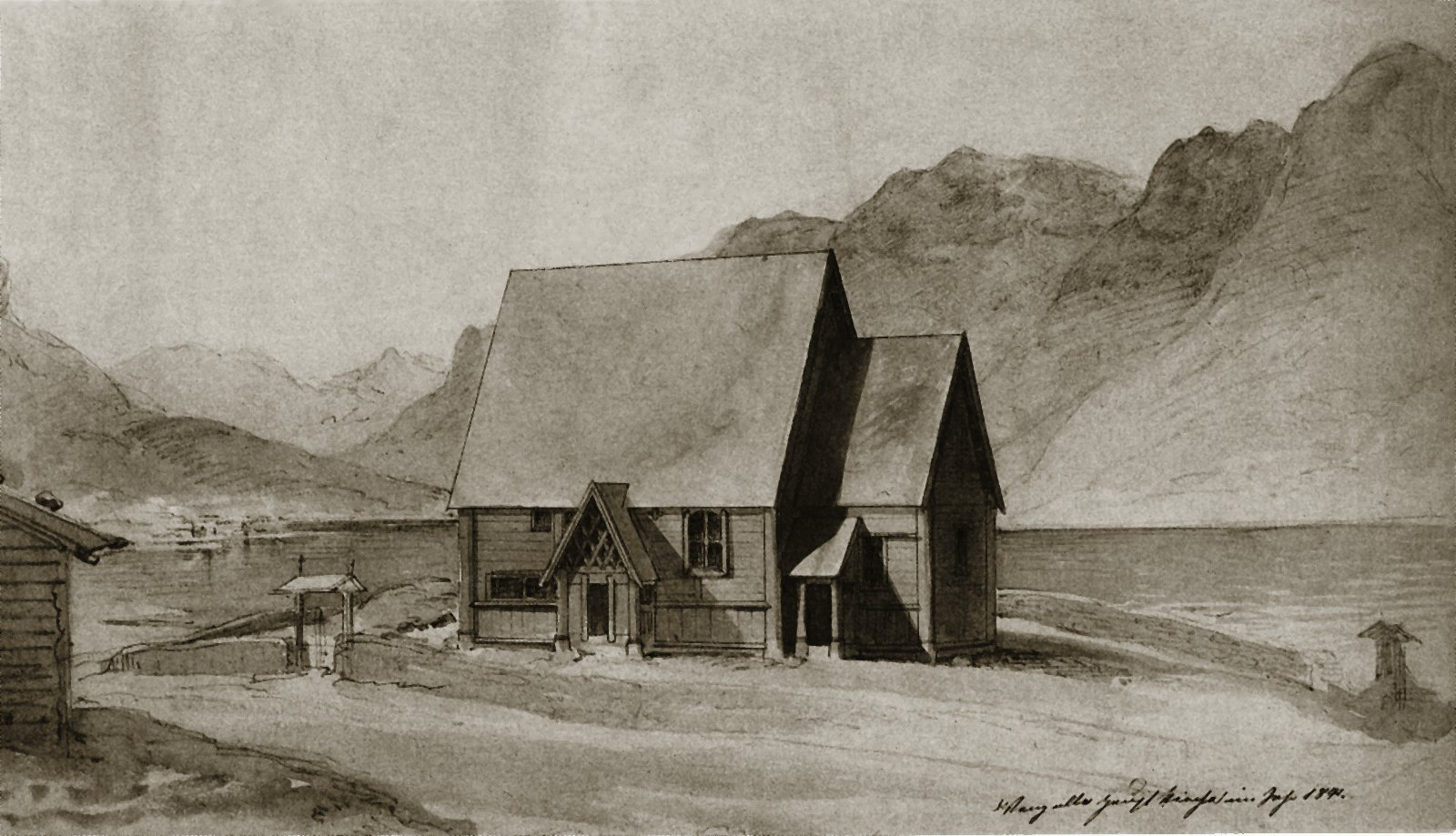
Drawing of the old church before it was torn down

== See also ==
- List of churches in Hamar
