= Sollihøgda =

Village in Hole Municipality, Norway

Coordinates: 59°58′N 10°21′E

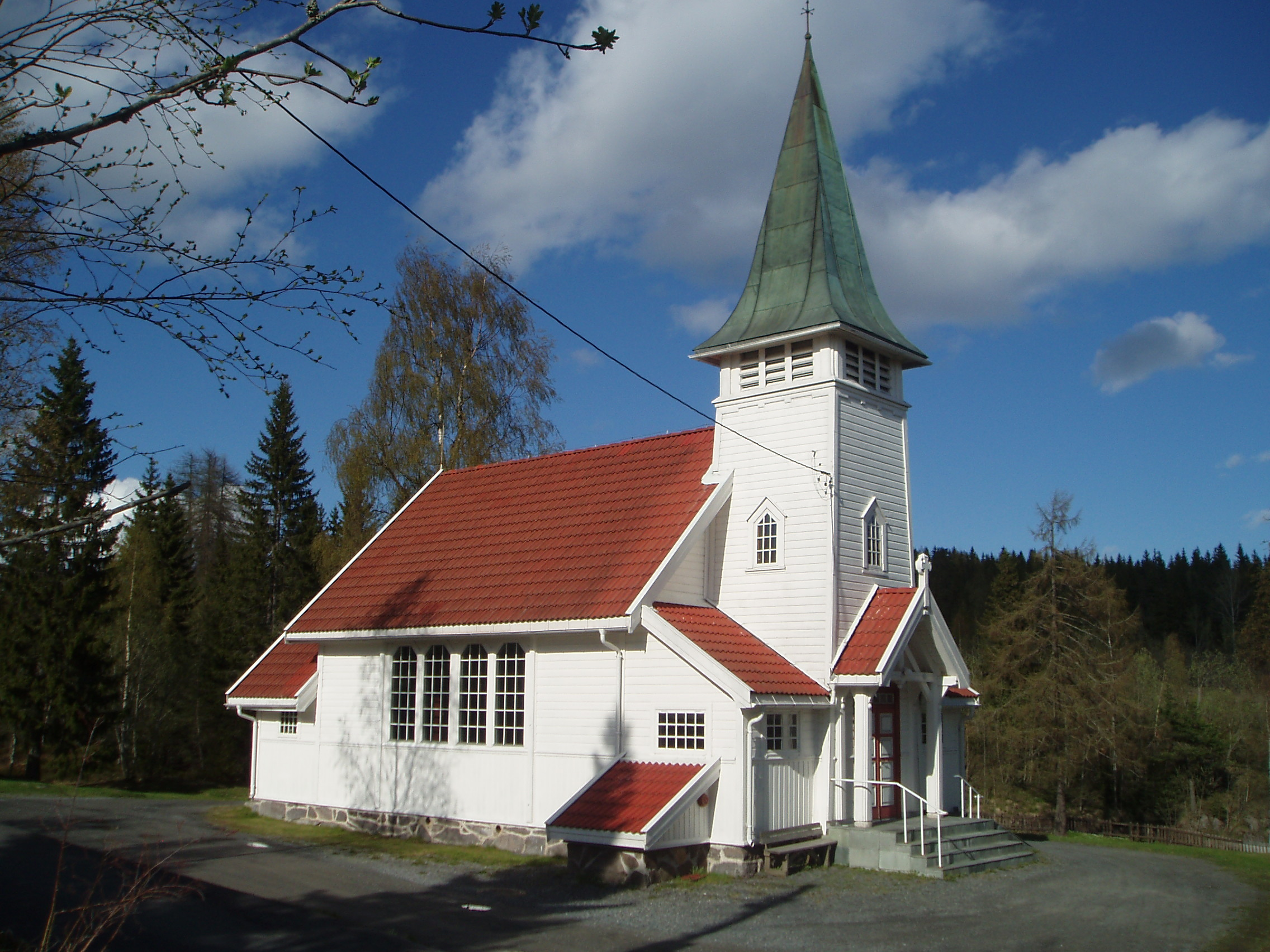
Sollihøgda Chapel, exterior

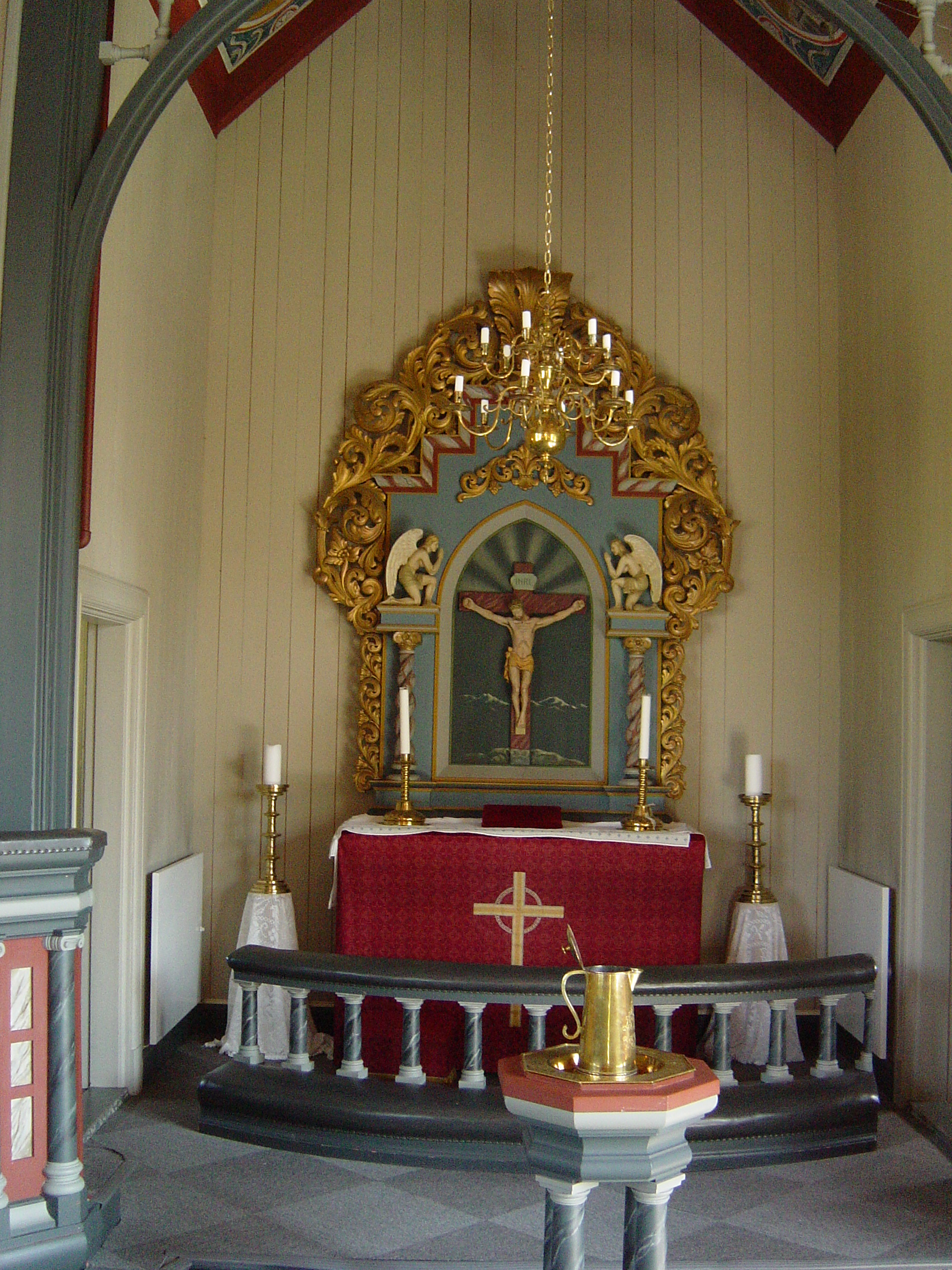
Sollihøgda Chapel altar

Sollihøgda is a village in Hole municipality, in the county of Buskerud, Norway. It is situated near the border with the municipality of Bærum, in the county of Akershus, 28 km from Oslo.

European route E16 passes through the village. Sollihøgda is a popular base for skiing at Krokskogen north of the road and in Vestmarka on the south side in the Oslomarka area in Oslo. Vestmarka is the southern continuation of Krokskogen.

Sollihøgda Chapel (Sollihøgda kapell) dates from 1911. The wooden church has 100 seats. It was designed by the architect Herman Major Backer (1856–1932).

== Notable residents ==
- Olav Thon- Norwegian real estate developer
