= Kjelfossen =

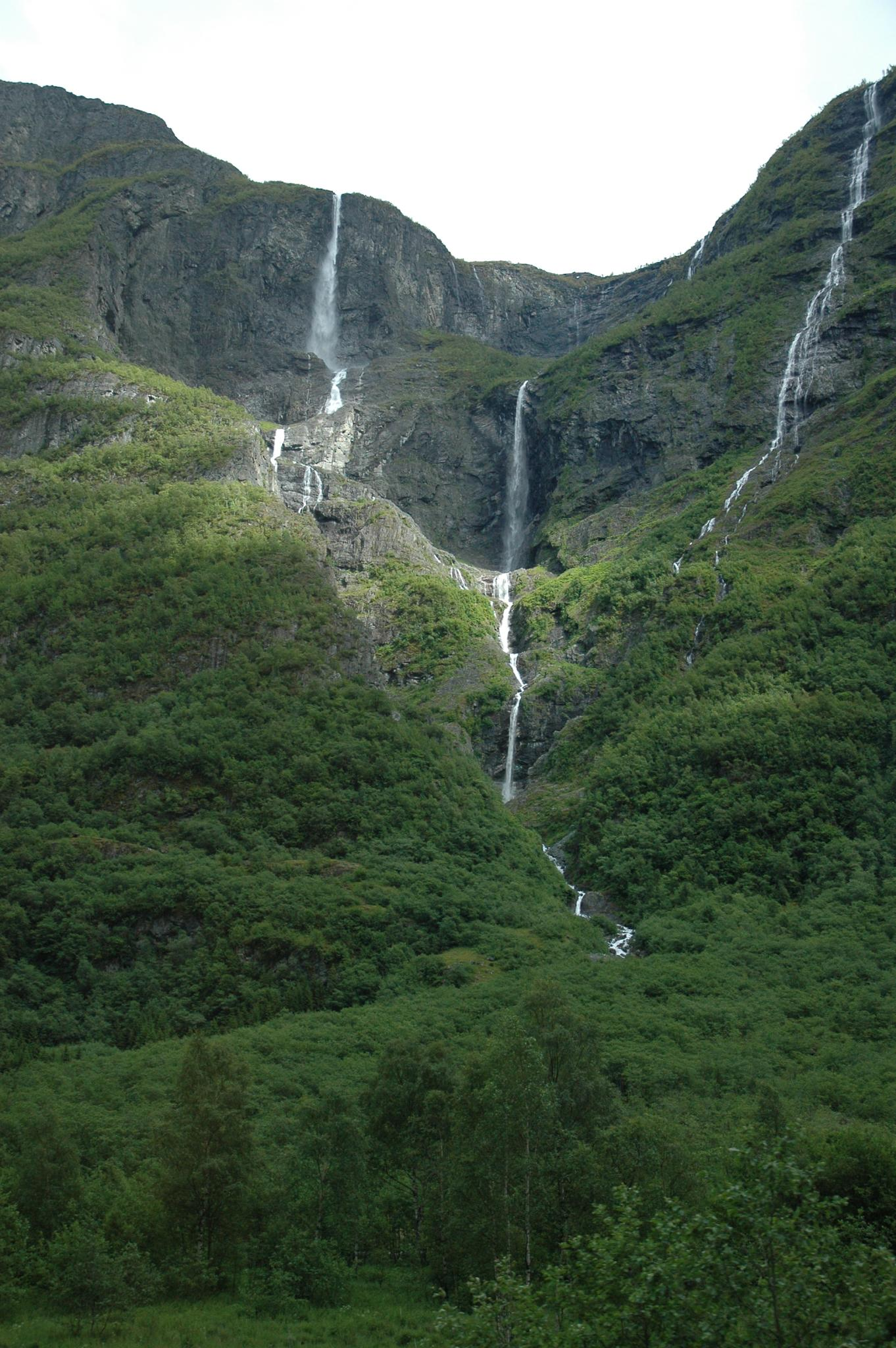
- View of the waterfall
- Interactive map of Kjelfossen
- Location: Vestland, Norway
- Coordinates: 60°52′29″N 06°51′43″E
- Type: Tiered plunges
- Elevation: 832 m (2,730 ft)
- Total height: 705 m (2,313 ft)
- Number of drops: 6
- Longest drop: 198 m (650 ft)
- Total width: 15 m (49 ft)
- Average width: 8 m (26 ft)
- Run: 488 m (1,601 ft)
- Watercourse: Kjelfossgrovi
- Average flow rate: 1.42 to 0.42 cubic metres per second (50 to 15 cu ft/s)
- World height ranking: 18

Kjelfossen is one of the highest waterfalls in Norway. They are located near the village of Gudvangen in Aurland Municipality in Vestland county.

The waterfall is only about 8 metres (26 ft) wide and has a flow of only 1.42 to 0.42 cubic metres per second (50 to 15 cu ft/s). There are six drops in the falls. The largest of the three main drops (the one on the left) is officially named Kjelfossen, but is also known as Stor Kjelfossen. The middle falls is known as Vetle Kjelfoss, and the one on the right (and the smallest by volume) is thought to be unnamed. The falls are located just east of Gudvangen at the end of the Nærøyfjord. The falls can be seen from the European route E16 highway, just west of the entrance into the Gudvanga Tunnel. The falls are located about 18 kilometres (11 mi) west of the village of Flåm and 27 kilometres (17 mi) west of the village of Aurlandsvangen.

== Height ==
With a total fall height of 705 metres (2,313 ft), the waterfall is listed as the 18th tallest waterfall in the world. The tallest single drop is 198 metres (650 ft). The height of the waterfall has never been accurately measured, so there are discrepancies in its actual height. Some sources list it as 840 metres (2,760 ft) tall.

== Gallery ==
Part of the Kjelfossen

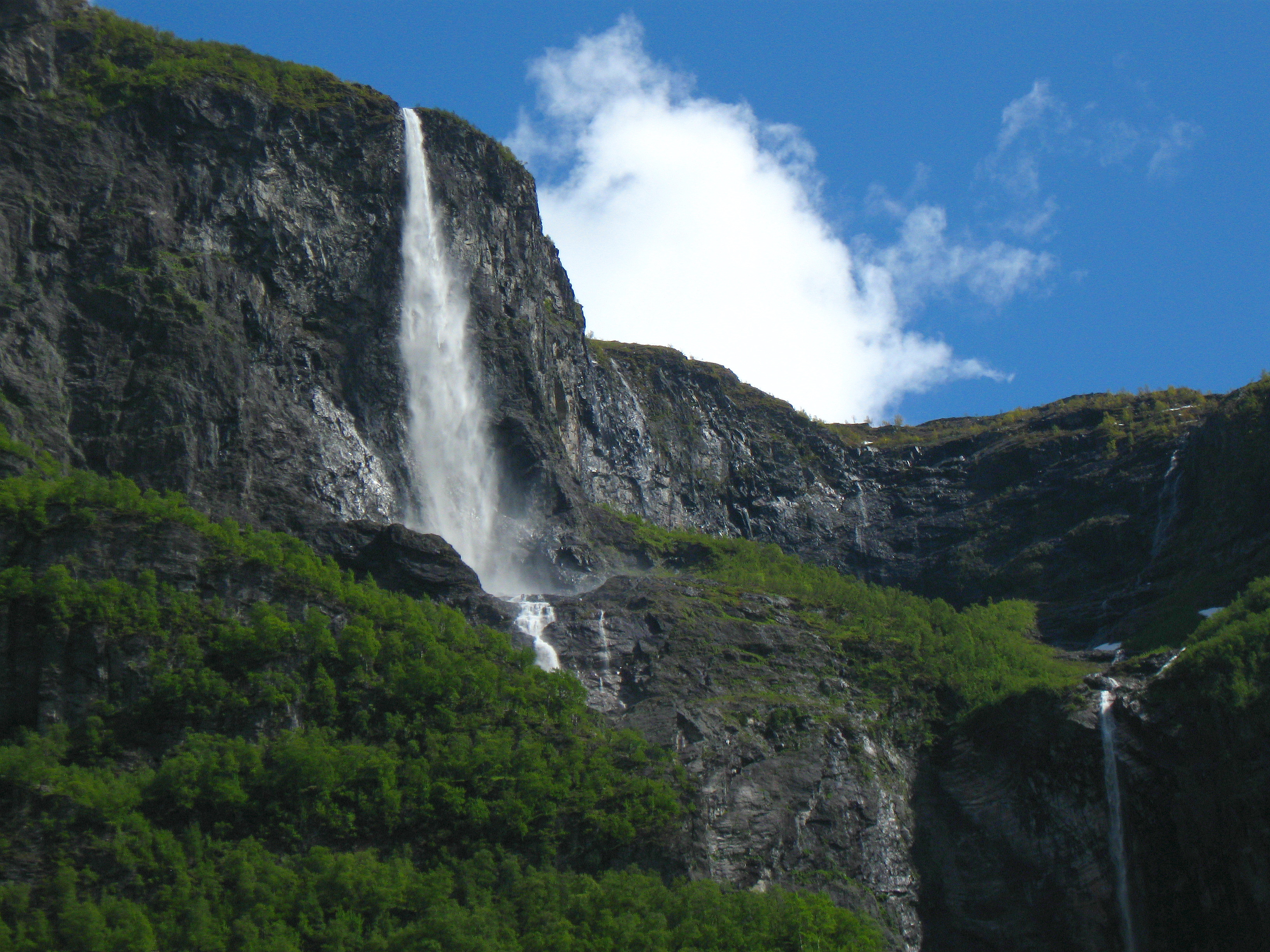
View of Kjelfossen

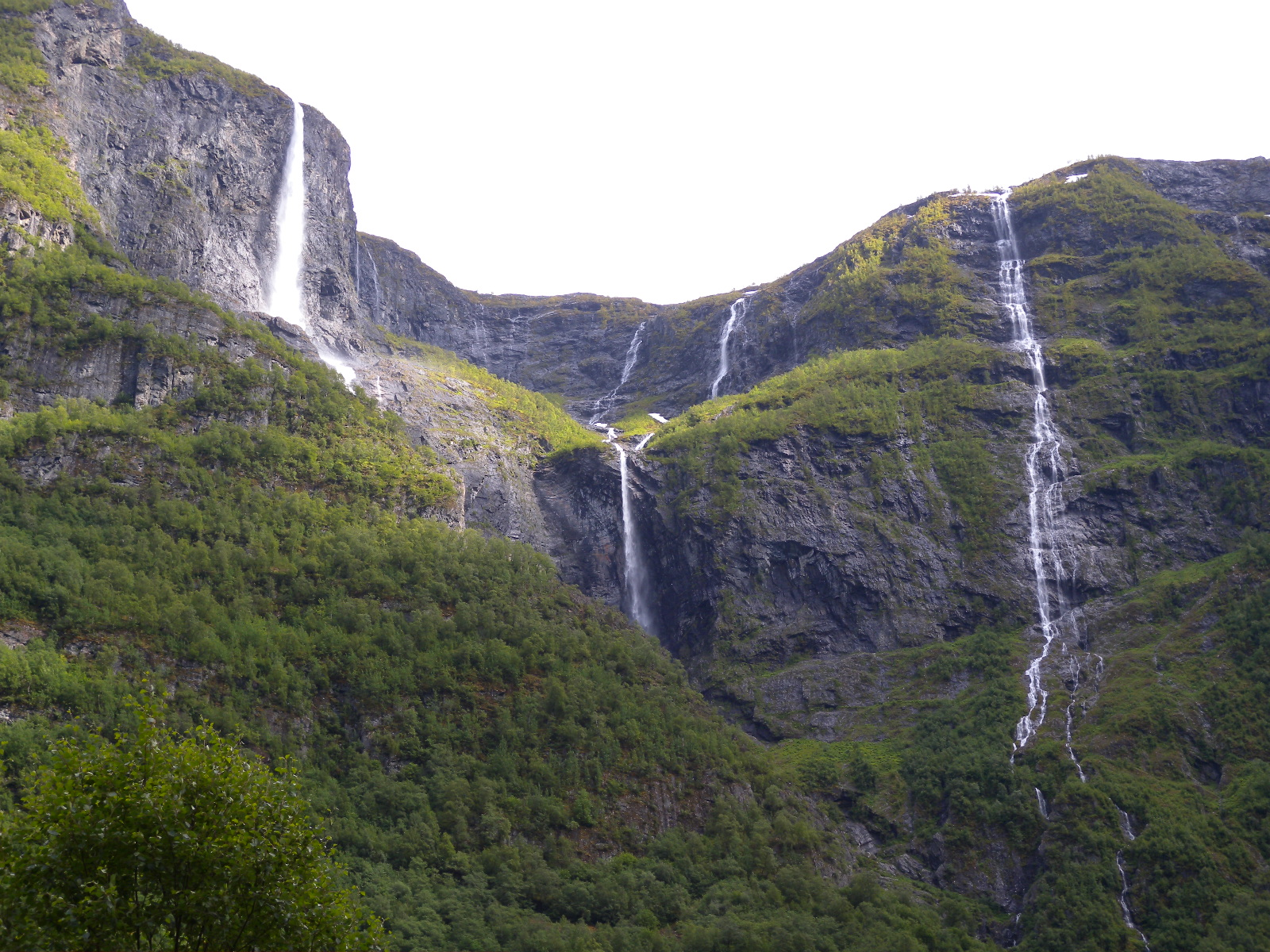
Kjelfossen

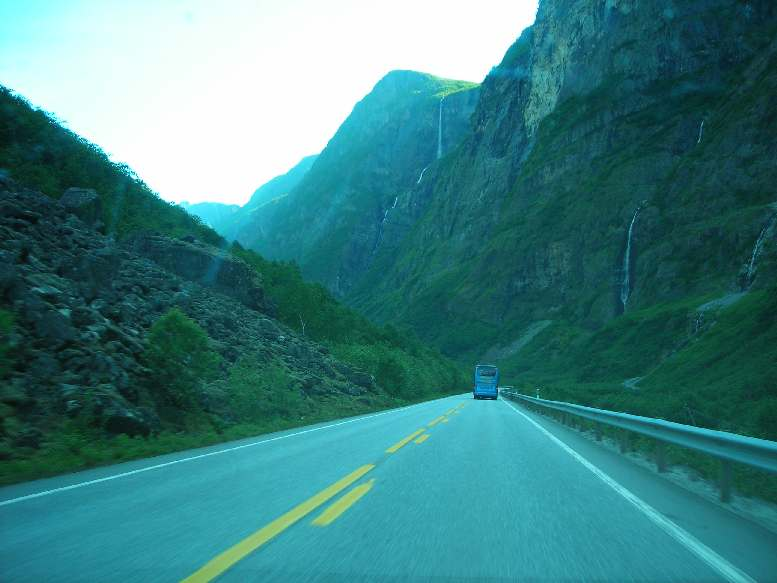
View from the highway

== See also ==
- List of waterfalls
- List of waterfalls by height
