= Gudvangen =

Village in Aurland Municipality, Norway

- Village
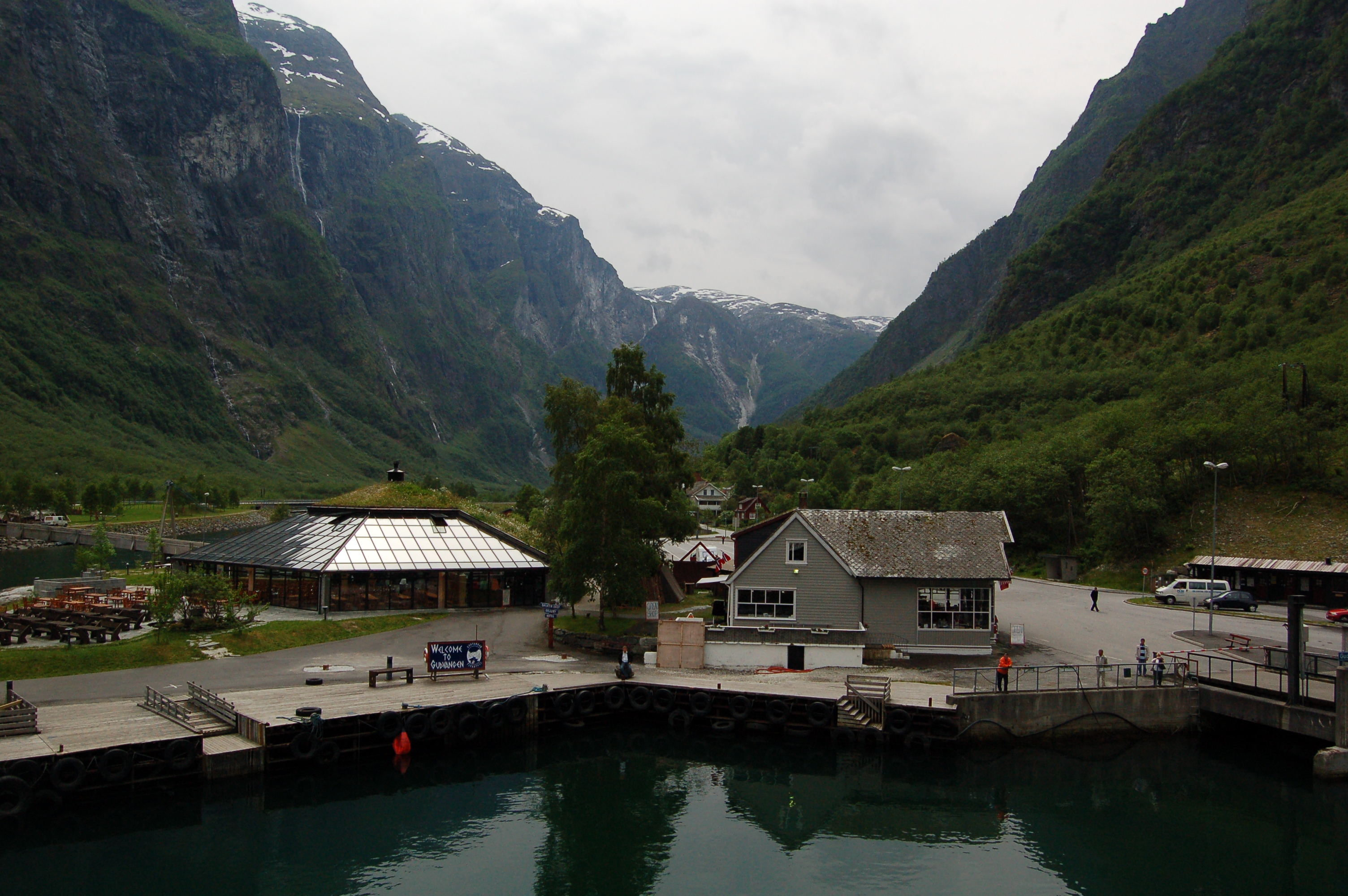
- Looking towards Gudvangen from the fjord
- Interactive map of Gudvangen
- Location within Vestland Location within Norway
- Coordinates: 60.8777°N 6.8379°E
- Country: Norway
- Region: Western Norway
- County: Vestland
- District: Sogn
- Municipality: Aurland Municipality
- Elevation: 6 m (20 ft)
- Time zone: UTC+01:00 (CET)
  - Summer (DST): UTC+02:00 (CEST)
- Post Code: 5747 Gudvangen

Gudvangen is a village in Aurland Municipality in Vestland county, Norway. It is a popular tourist destination and is located at the end of the Nærøyfjord where the Nærøydalselvi river empties into the fjord. The European route E16 highway passes by the village. Heading southwest on the highway leads to Voss Municipality while heading northeast the E16 enters the Gudvanga Tunnel on its way to the villages of Flåm, Undredal, and Aurlandsvangen. The nearby village of Bakka lies about 5 kilometres (3.1 mi) to the north. The Kjelfossen waterfall is located just to the southeast of the village.

== Name ==
The name Gudvangen (Old Norse: Guðvangir) comes from the old farm name. The first element is gud meaning "god". The second element is vangen which comes from the definite form of the word vang which means "meadow" or "grassy area". This likely refers to the open space in front of a place of worship, similar to the nearby places Aurlandsvangen and Vossevangen. In Gudvangen, there have been several places of worship since pre-Christian times.

== Media gallery ==
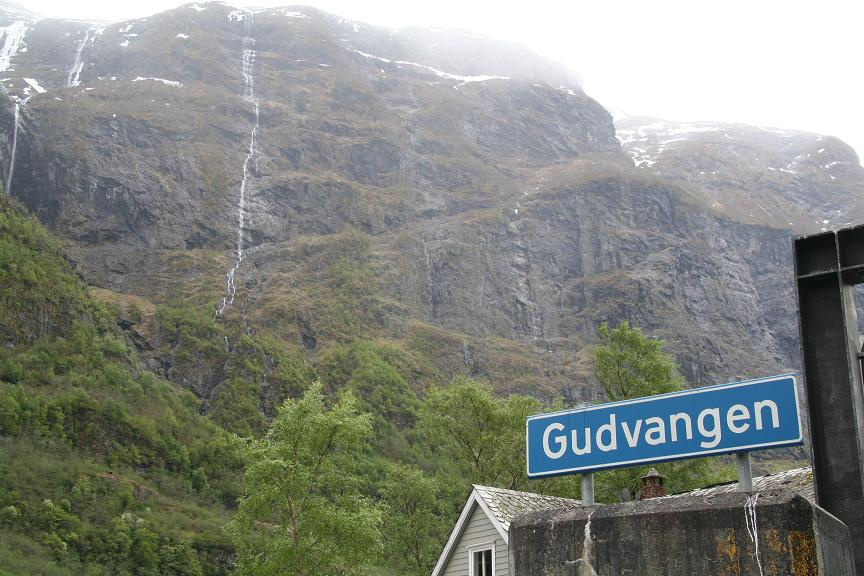
Gudvangen

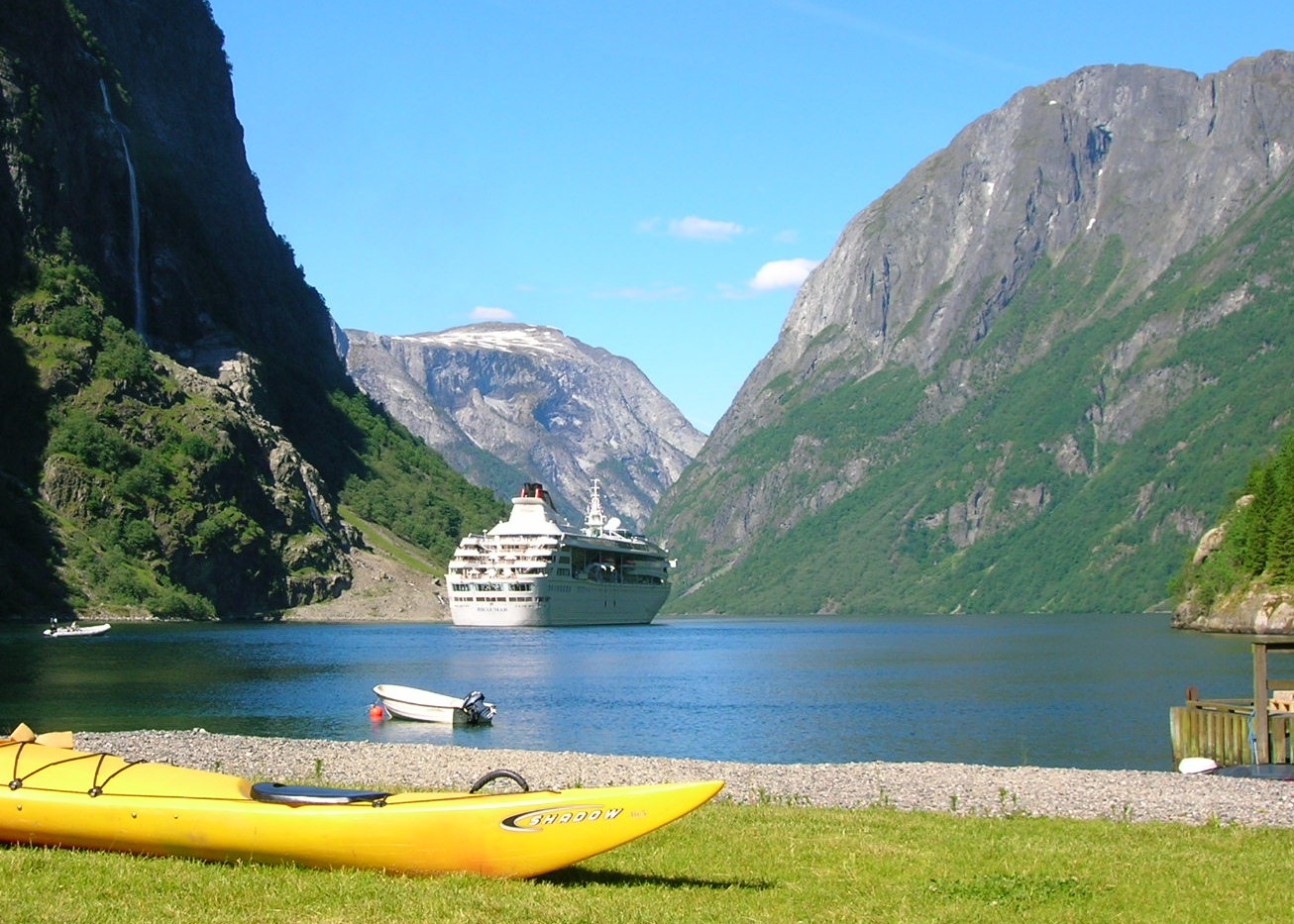
Cruise ship in Gudvangen

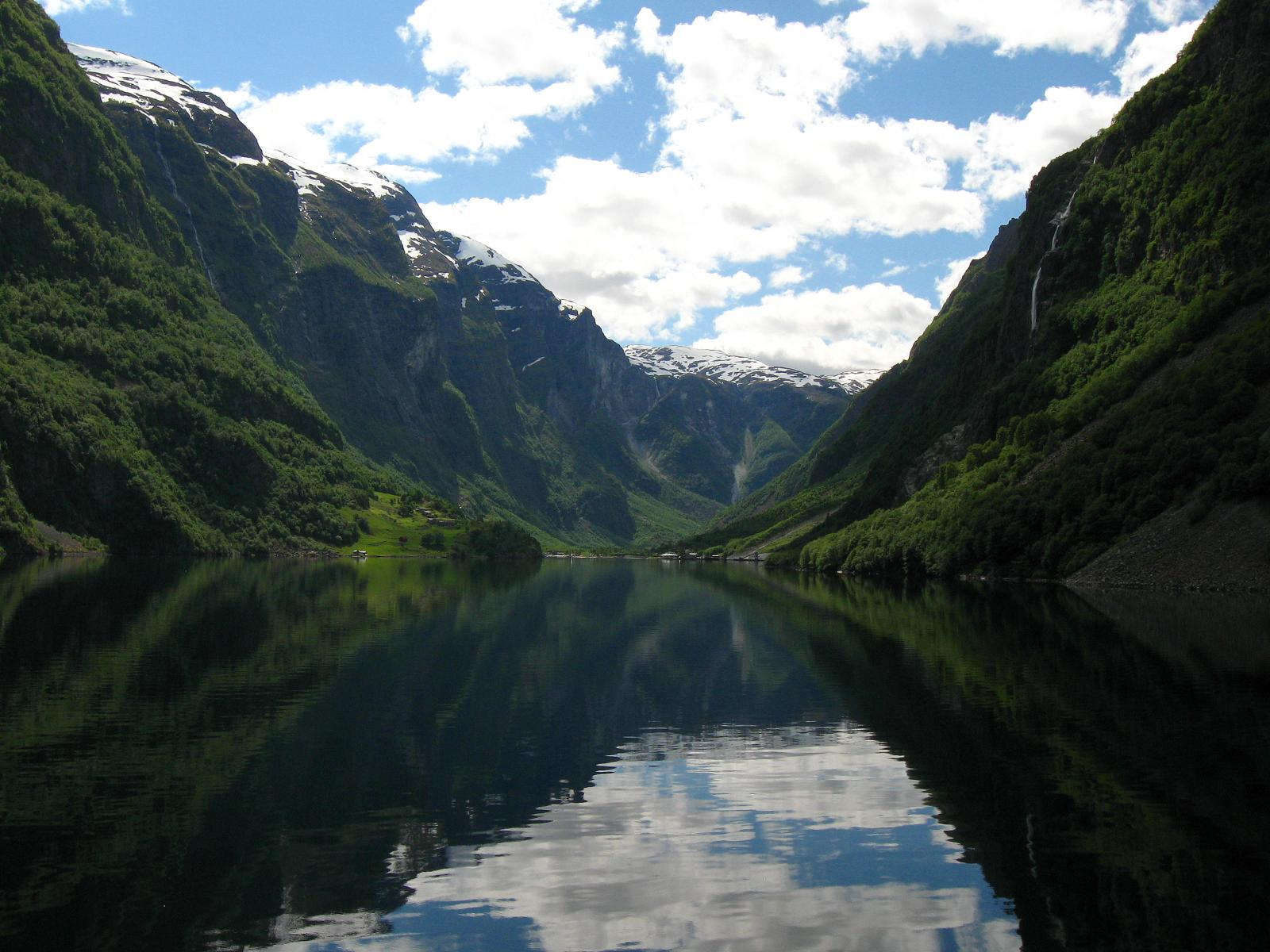
Looking to Gudvangen from the fjord

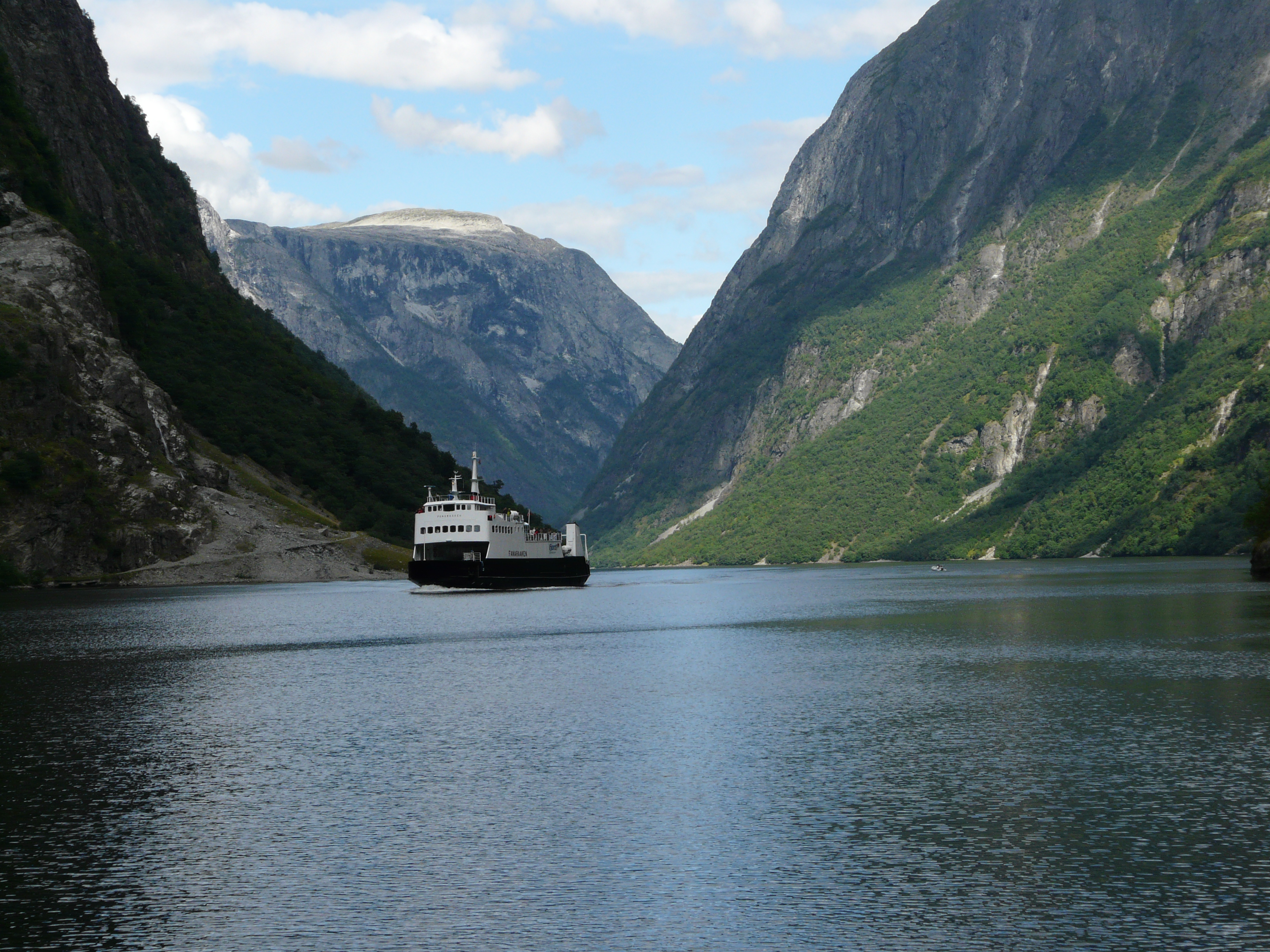
Ferry arriving at Gudvangen

Viking Valley
