= Stensgård Church =

Coordinates: 60°16′39.17″N 11°5′18.75″E

- Stensgård kirke
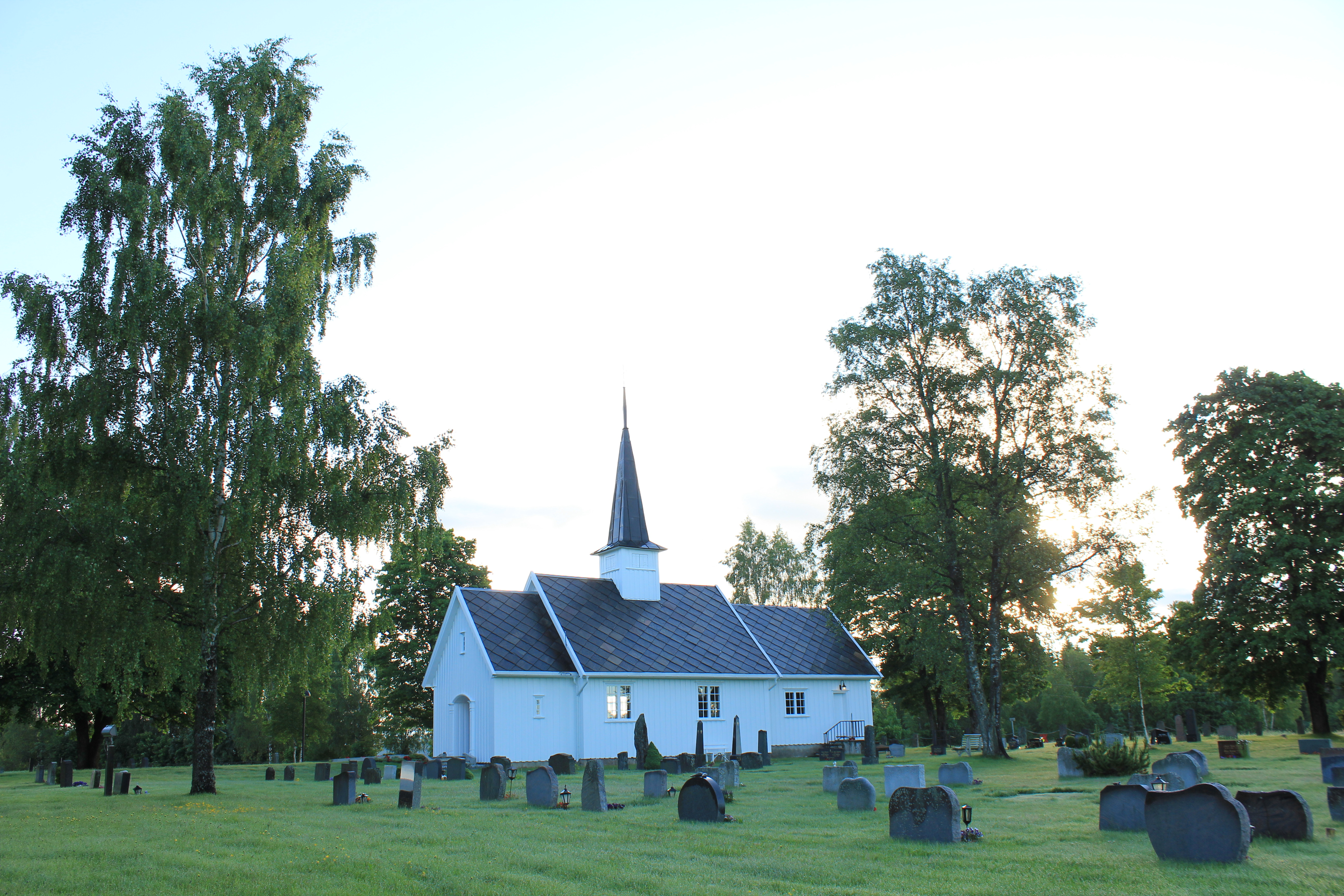

- Location of the church
- Location: Nannestad, Akershus
- Country: Norway
- Denomination: Church of Norway
- Churchmanship: Evangelical Lutheran

History
- Status: Parish church

Architecture
- Functional status: Active
- Architect: Herman Backer
- Completed: 1902

Specifications
- Capacity: 92
- Materials: Wood

Administration
- Deanery: Øvre Romerike

Stensgård Church (Norwegian: Stensgård kirke) is "long church" (Norwegian: langkirke) dating from 1902 in the municipality of Nannestad in Akershus county, Norway. The church is part of the Church of Norway and it belongs to the deanery of Øvre Romerike in the Diocese of Borg.

The building can accommodate 92 people. The cornerstone was laid in a simple ceremony on Saint John's Day in 1901. It was consecrated on November 26, 1902 in a mass celebrated by Bishop Anton Christian Bang attended by eight priests.
