= Julie E. Backer =

Norwegian demographer and statistician (1890–1977)

Julie Elisabeth Backer
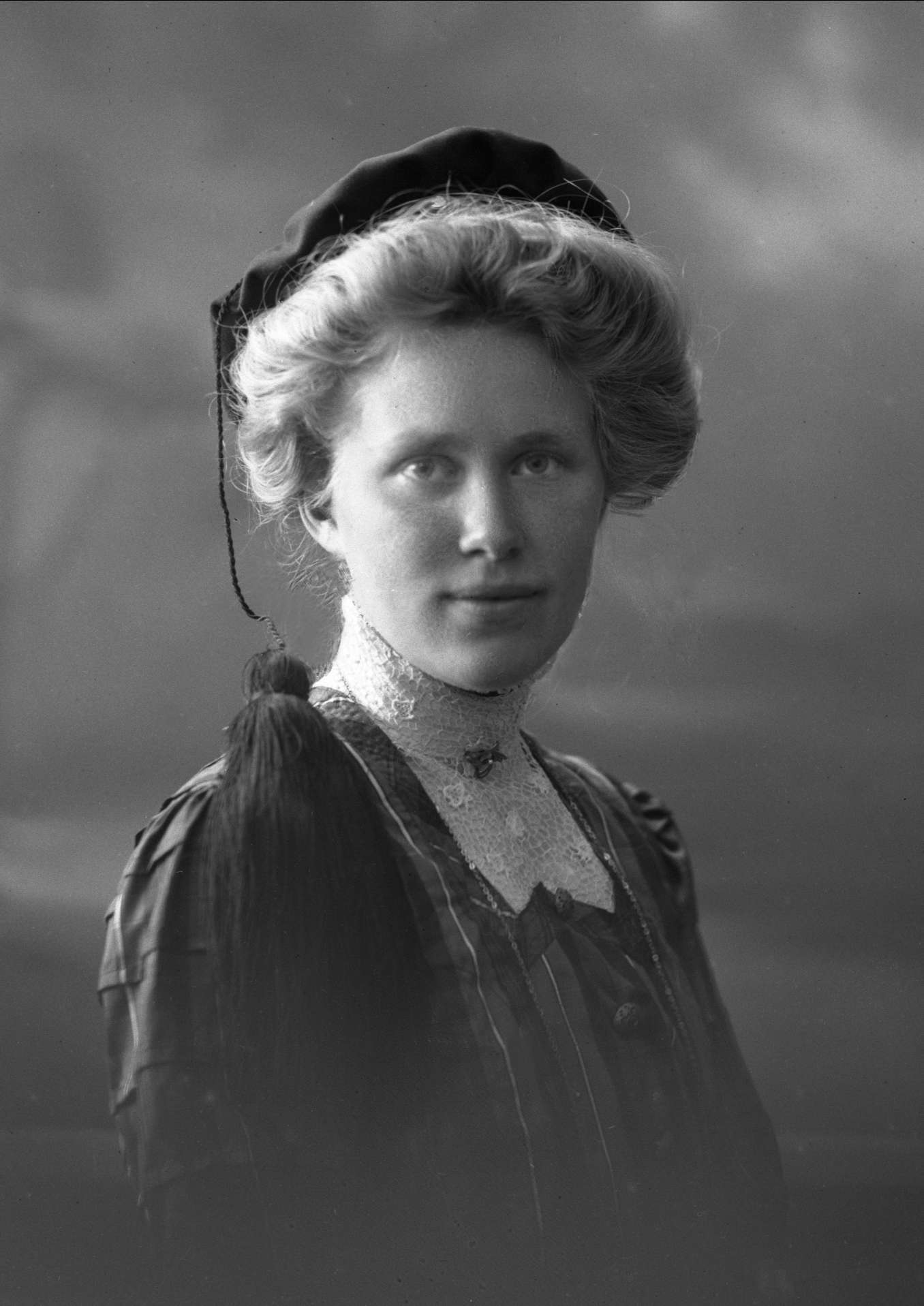
- Born: 31 August 1890; Kristiania, Norway
- Died: 31 December 1977 (aged 87); Oslo, Norway
- Occupation: Statistician
- Known for: Historical research on mortality
- Parents: Herman Backer (father); Elisabeth Christiane née Boeck (mother)

Julie Elisabeth Backer (31 August 1890 – 31 December 1977) was a Norwegian statistician who was bureau chief for Norway's Central Bureau of Statistics 1936–1956 specializing in the study of mortality.

== Biography ==
She was born in Kristiania as a daughter of architect Herman Backer (1856–1932) and Elisabeth Christiane née Boeck (1868–1958). After finishing her secondary education in 1909 she took the cand.oecon. degree in 1912. She worked a few years as a calculator at the life insurance company Gjensidige before being employed in Statistics Norway in 1917.

In 1920-1921 she studied at the University of Montpellier, and in 1922 she worked at the L'Institut international de Commerce in Brussels. In 1929 she studied Medical Statistics at the League of Nations in Geneva.

She served as bureau chief for Statistics Norway in 1936–1956, and later became a consultant in the research department there.

In 1938 she took the dr.philos. degree with the thesis Dødeligheten blandt lungetuberkuløse, on the mortality among tuberculosis victims.

Her principal interests and responsibilities lay in health and population statistics. She became head of her division in 1936 and served in that post until her retirement in 1956. After her retirement, she still continued her research and carried on publishing.

She was an elected member of the International Statistical Institute, the International Union for the Scientific Study of Population and a World Health Organization expert panel on statistical classification of diseases.

== Notable works ==
Backer was widely published, particularly concerning population statistics and medical-statistical topics.

- (1947) Population Statistics and Population Registration in Norway. Part I. The Vital Statistics of Norway: an Historical Review, Population Studies, 1(2), 212-226
- (1948) Population statistics and population registration in Norway. Part 2, Population Studies, 2(3), 318-338
- (1961) Trend of Mortality and Causes of Death in Norway 1856-1955 (Dødeligheten og dens årsaker i Norge. 1856–1955)
- (1965) Marriages, Births and Migrations in Norway 1856-1960 (Ekteskap, fødsler og vandringer i Norge 1856–1960)
- (1967) Infant Mortality Problems in Norway, Pediatrics, 41(5)
