= Sollihøgda Chapel =

Church in Buskerud, Norway

- Sollihøgda kapell
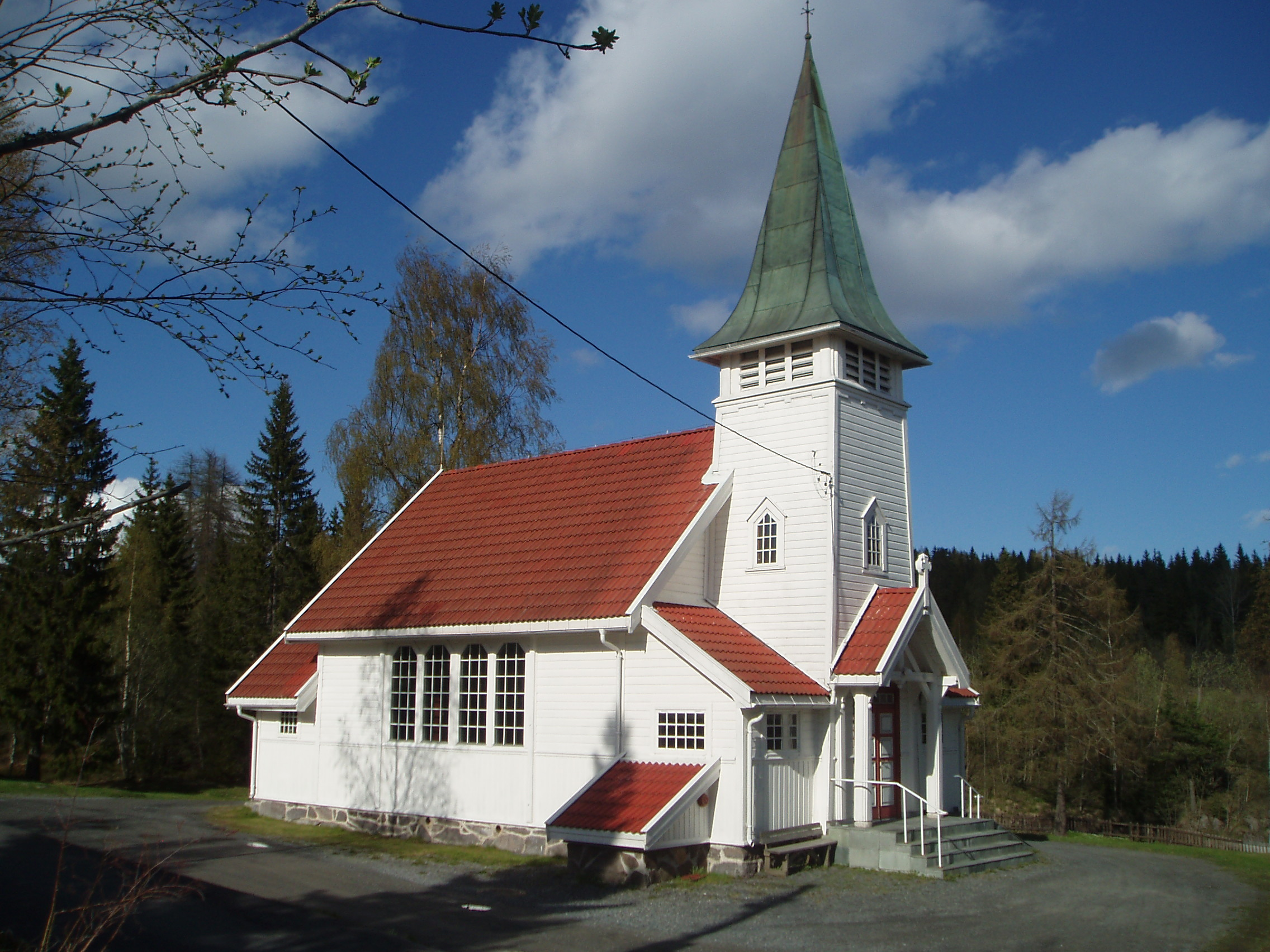
- View of the chapel
- Sollihøgda Chapel
- 59°58′00″N 10°20′55″E
- Location: Hole, Buskerud
- Country: Norway
- Denomination: Church of Norway
- Churchmanship: Evangelical Lutheran

History
- Status: Parish church
- Founded: 1911
- Consecrated: 11 Oct 1911

Architecture
- Functional status: Active
- Architect: Herman Backer
- Architectural type: Long church
- Completed: 1911 (115 years ago)

Specifications
- Capacity: 100
- Materials: Wood

Administration
- Diocese: Tunsberg
- Deanery: Ringerike prosti
- Parish: Hole
- Norwegian Cultural Heritage Site
- Type: Church
- Status: Listed
- ID: 85517

Sollihøgda Chapel (Norwegian: Sollihøgda kapell) is a parish church of the Church of Norway in Hole Municipality in Buskerud county, Norway. It is located in the village of Sollihøgda. It is one of the churches for the Hole parish which is part of the Ringerike prosti (deanery) in the Diocese of Tunsberg. The white, wooden church was built in a long church design in 1911 using plans drawn up by the architect Herman Backer. The church seats about 100 people.

== History ==
Sollihøgda Chapel is a wooden long church that was designed by the architect Herman Backer. It was built to serve the rural southeastern part of the municipality in 1911. The chapel was consecrated on 11 October 1911. The construction costs were paid for by Hofjægermester Thomas Fearnley, his wife Elisabeth (née Young), and Harriet Wedel-Jarlsberg. The group also established a foundation to pay for the ongoing maintenance of the chapel.

== Media gallery ==
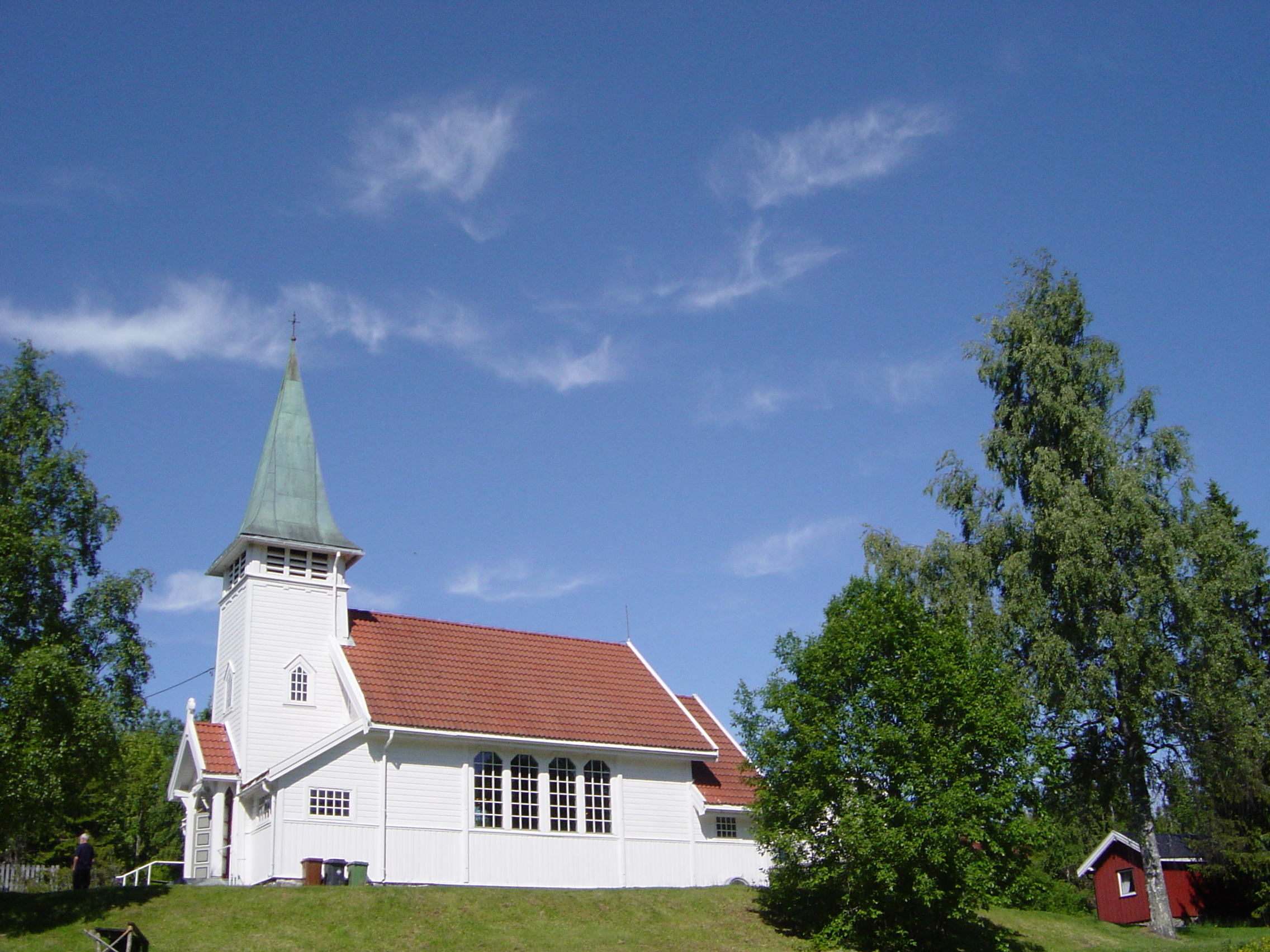

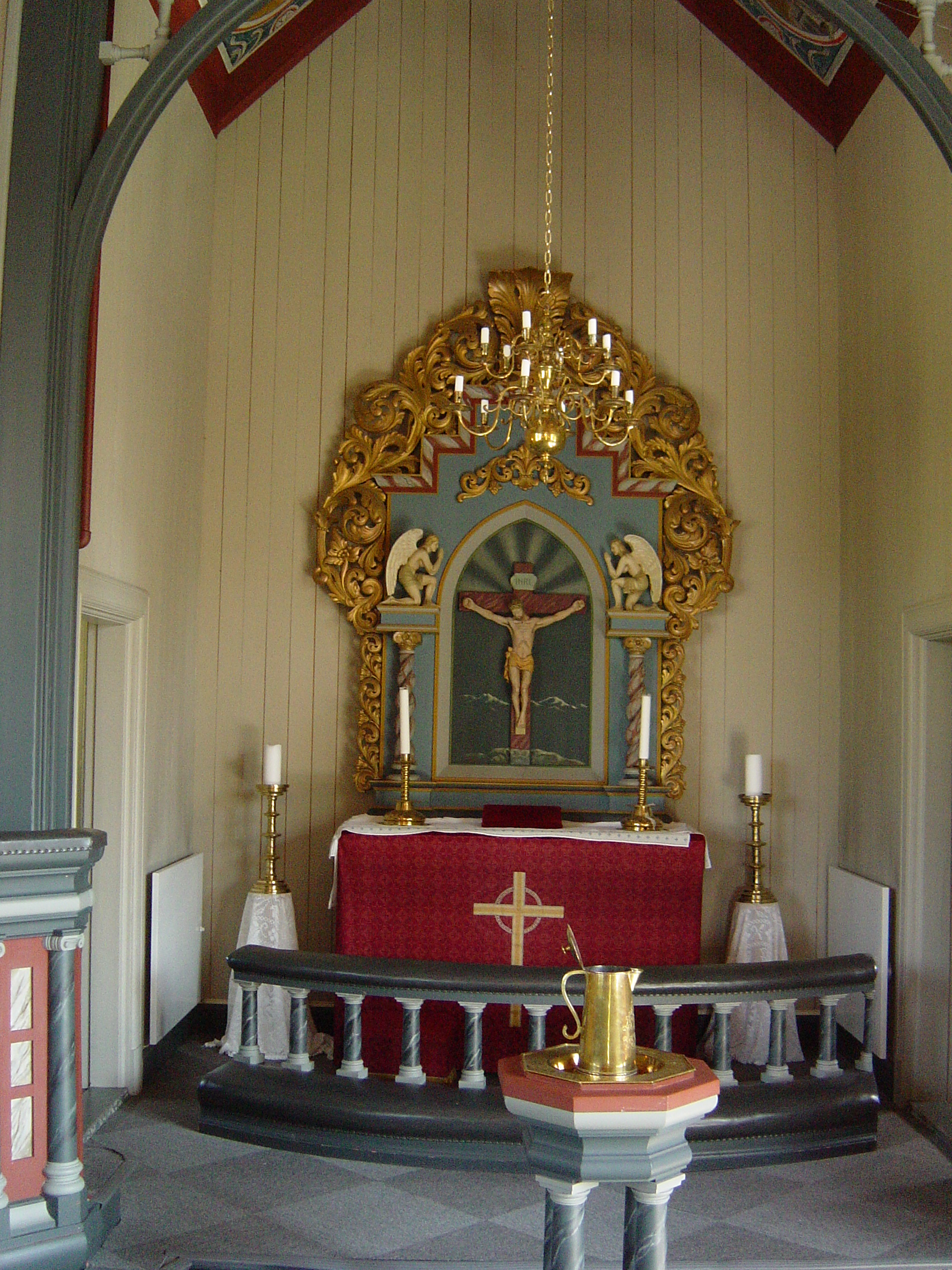

== See also ==
- List of churches in Tunsberg
