= Herman Backer =

Norwegian architect

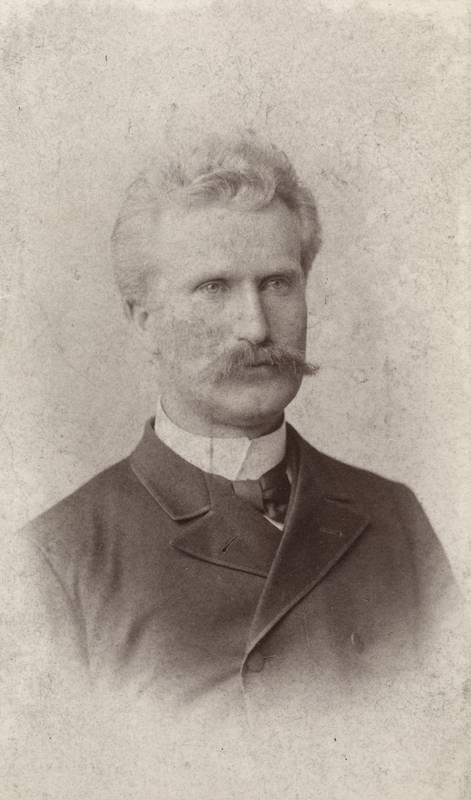
- Herman Backer
- Born: 30 October 1856; Christiania, Norway
- Died: 21 May 1932 (aged 75); Christiania, Norway
- Education: Norwegian National Academy of Craft and Art Industry
- Occupation: Architect
- Known for: St John's Church, Bergen
- Children: Lars Backer, Julie Backer

Herman Major Backer (October 30, 1856 – May 21, 1932) was a Norwegian architect. He is best known for having designed many luxury houses, grand public buildings, and business buildings, as well as hotels and churches. Backer was very productive and was one of the leading architects in Norway in the decades around 1900. His son Lars Backer was later one of Norway's leading functionalist architects.

Backer was educated at Wilhelm von Hanno's drawing school, at the Norwegian National Academy of Craft and Art Industry in Christiania, and in Dresden. When he returned to Norway from abroad, he first worked for three years as a stipendiary building inspector in Christiania before he established his own practice in the town in 1882.

== Selected works ==
One of the first large commissions that Backer accepted was to design a mansion for the lumber merchant and government minister Hans Rasmus Astrup. The Minister Astrup Mansion (Norwegian: Statsråd Astrups villa) stands at Drammensveien no. 78 in Oslo and was built in 1887 as a private home for Astrup and his family. In 1911 the building was taken over by the Norwegian Academy of Science and Letters, which still owns the building today.

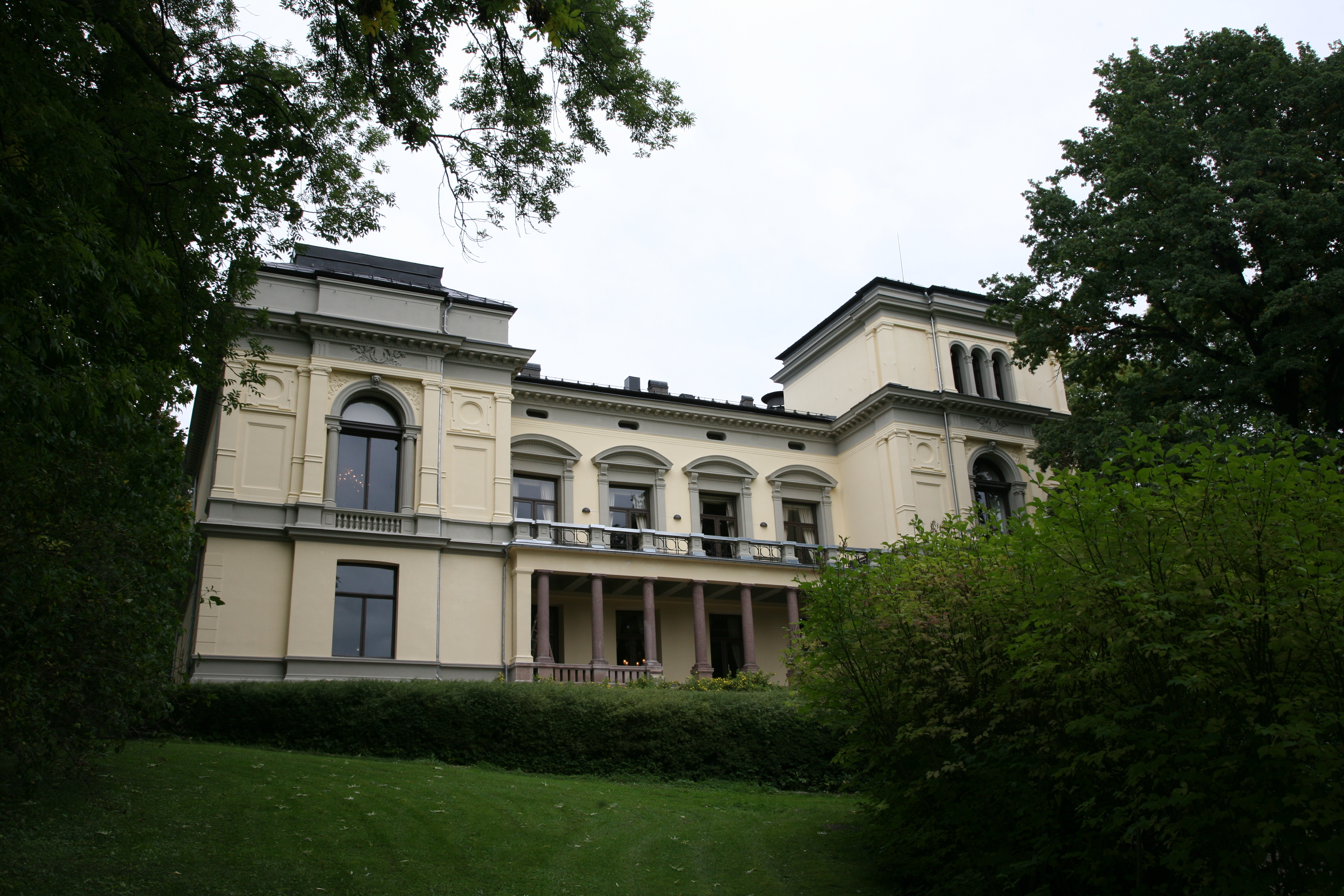
Minister Astrup Mansion

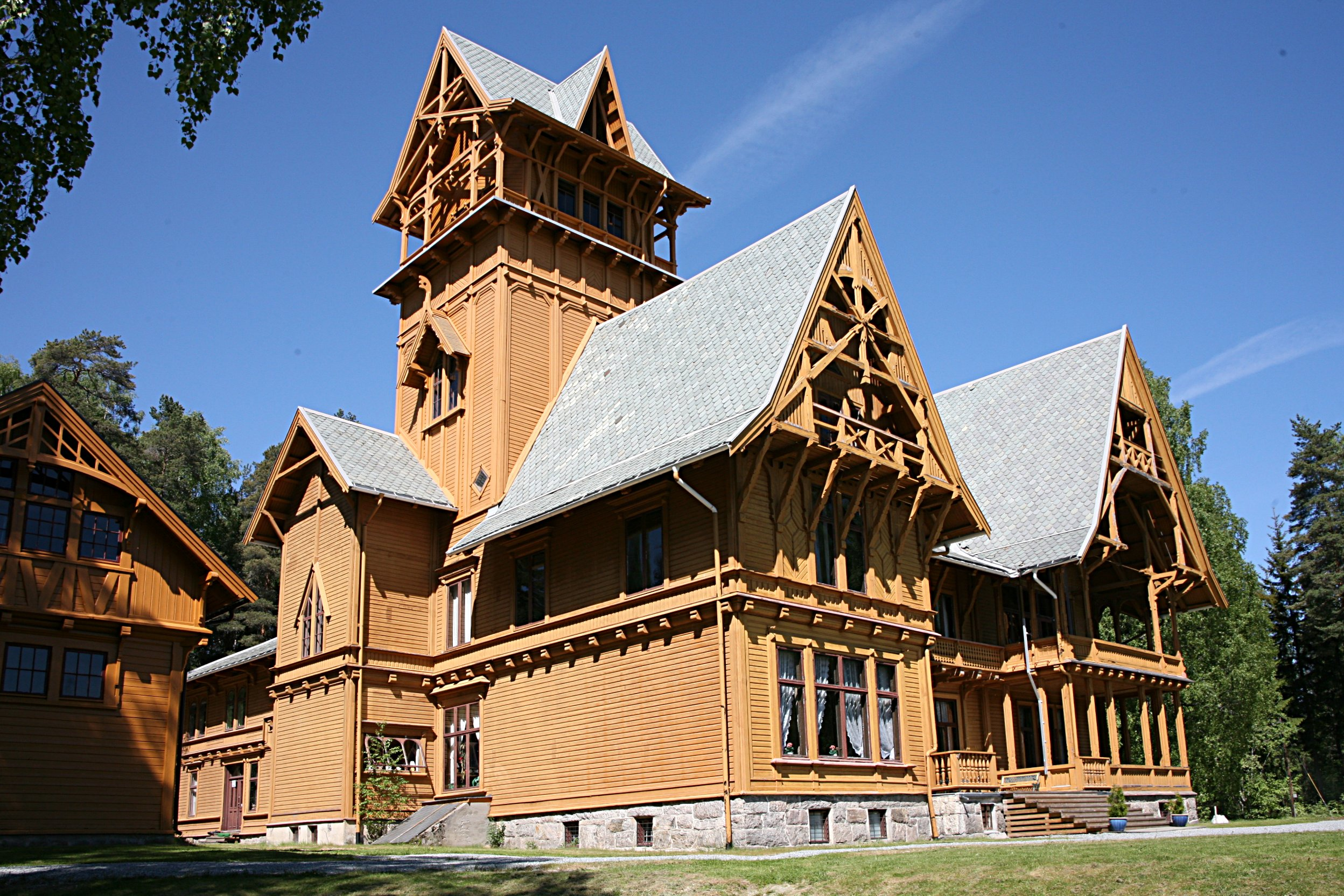
Fridheim Mansion

Around the same time he designed the Fridheim Mansion (Norwegian: Villa Fridheim) on the shore of Krøderen for the lumber merchant Svend Haug from Drammen. The building was intended to serve as a country home for the lumber merchant and his family. Later it was used as a hotel, and since 1986 the Fridheim Mansion Adventure Museum has been located there.

Backer designed another mansion at the Skaugum estate. It was commissioned by Fritz Wedel Jarlsberg and was built in 1891 in a style similar to that of the Fridheim Mansion. The Skaugum estate was presented to Crown Prince Olav and Crown Princess Märtha, who moved into it in 1929. The mansion was destroyed by fire on May 20, 1930.

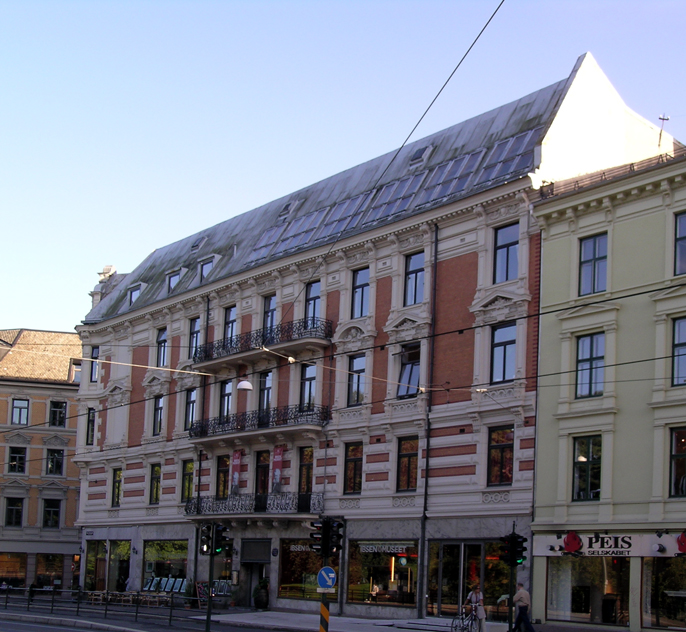
Ibsen Museum

Backer also designed the Olympen Restaurant at Grønlandsleiret no. 15 in Oslo, built in 1882. The building was commissioned by the Schou Brewery and was built of brick with plaster ornamentation. The building was remodeled by his son Lars Backer in 1927. A restaurant has operated in the building since it was opened in 1892.

In the mid-1890s, Backer designed the building at Arbins gate no. 1 in Oslo. This is the house where Henrik Ibsen lived during his last years, and the building now contains the Oslo Ibsen Museum.

Backer's Backergården building is a Baroque Revival structure at Kongens gate no. 31 in Oslo. It was built for the businessman Johan Paul Jørgen Alexander Backer and his fur business in 1895. The building was built with a steel supporting skeleton structure that allows the large windows. The facade is clad with Norwegian marble from the Dunderland Valley in Rana Municipality.

Other works by Backer include Saint John's Church in Bergen, Klemetsrud Church, Sollihøgda Chapel, Stensgård Church, Krebsegården at Holtegata no. 20 in Oslo, the Victoria Hotel in Lillehammer, Simersgården at Grev Wedels plass no. 4 in Oslo, the Alfheim Complex at Pilestredet no. 27 in Oslo, the dormitory building at Jønsberg Upper Secondary School in Romedal Municipality, and an addition to the Madserud estate at Madserud allé no 34 in Oslo.
