= Gudvanga Tunnel =

Road tunnel in western Norway

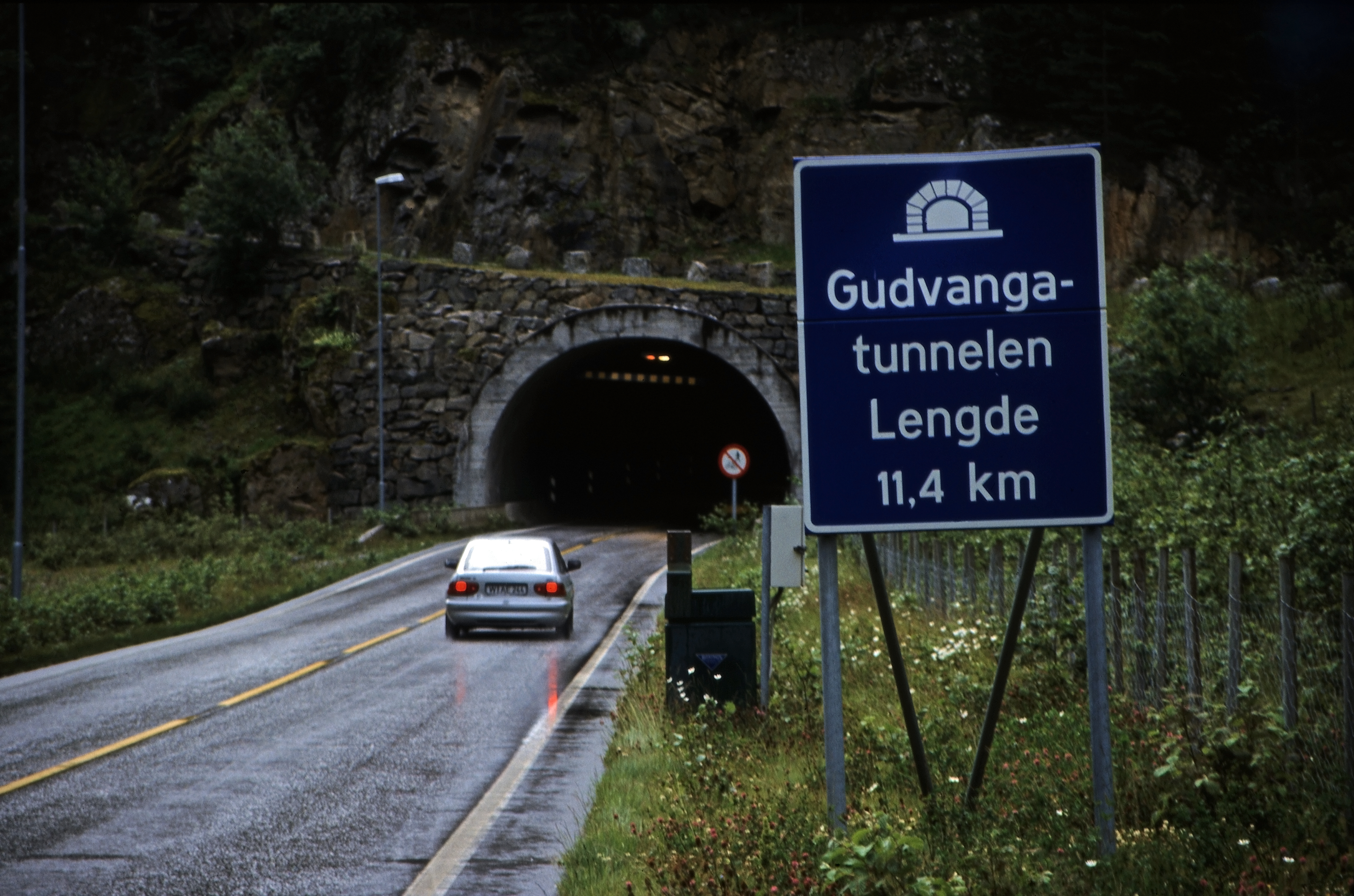
- View of the entrance to the tunnel
- Interactive map of Gudvanga Tunnel

Overview
- Other name: Gudvangatunnelen (Norwegian)
- Location: Aurland Municipality, Norway
- Coordinates: 60°53′07″N 06°56′59″E
- Route: E16

Operation
- Opened: 1991
- Character: Passenger

Technical
- Length: 11,428 m (7.1 mi)
- Max elevation: 70 m (230 ft)

The Gudvanga Tunnel (Norwegian: Gudvangatunnelen) is located in Aurland Municipality in Vestland county, Norway. The tunnel connects the village of Gudvangen, at the head of the Nærøyfjord, with the Undredalen valley and is part of European Route E16. At 11,428 metres (7.1 mi) in length, it is Norway's third longest road tunnel. It was opened on 17 December 1991.

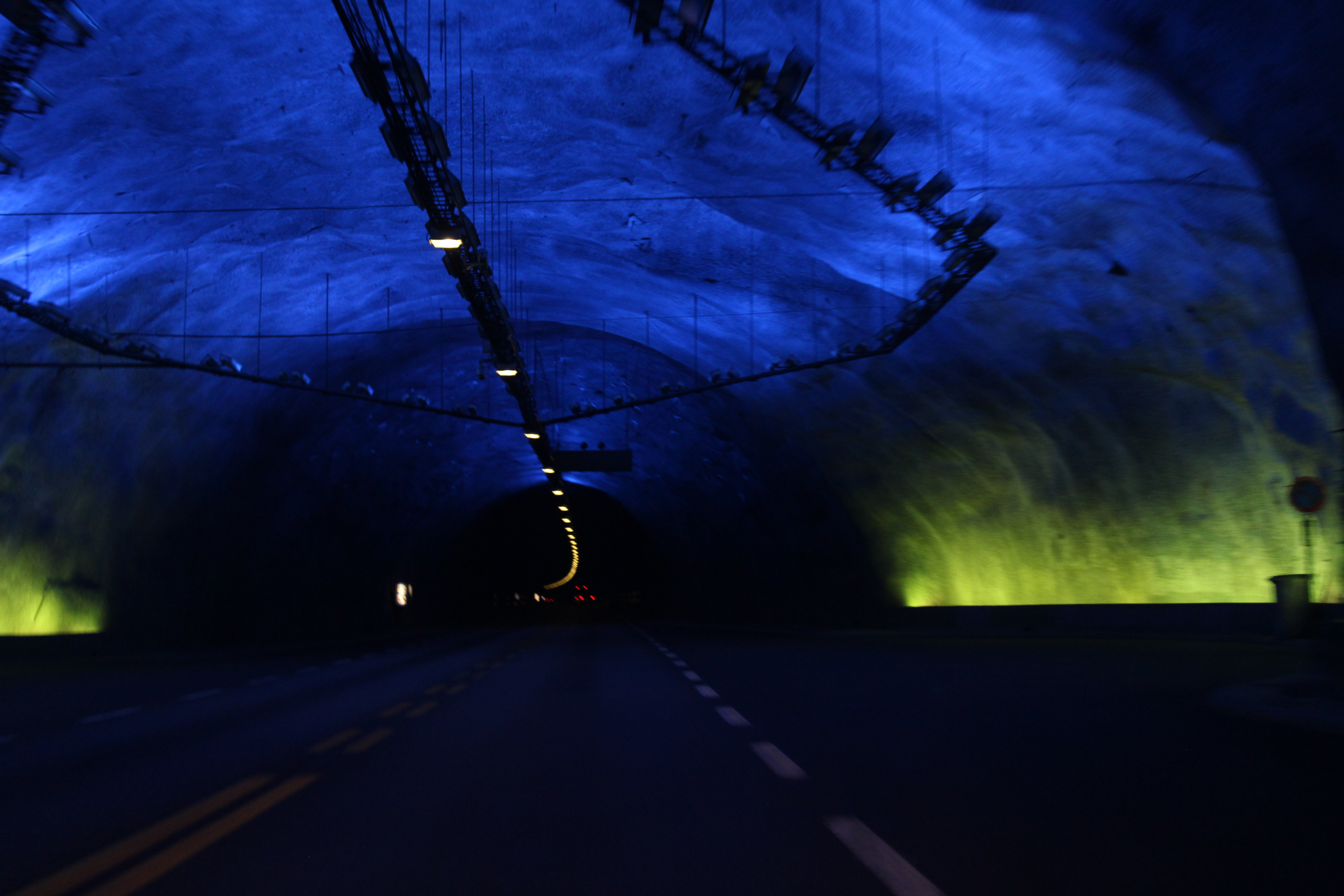
Interior of the tunnel

== Nearby tunnels ==
After passing through the Gudvanga Tunnel, drivers pass through a number of other tunnels. About 500 metres (1,600 ft) east of the eastern exit from the Gudvanga Tunnel a new tunnel begins: the 5,053-metre (16,578 ft) long Flenja Tunnel which ends at the village of Flåm. Approximately 1 kilometre (0.62 mi) after that tunnel is the 1,363-metre (4,472 ft) Fretheim Tunnel. About 7 kilometres (4.3 mi) further to the east (near the village of Aurlandsvangen) is the entrance to the 24.5-kilometre (15.2 mi) long Lærdal Tunnel, which is the world's longest road tunnel. This means that in a 51.5 kilometres (32.0 mi) section of the E16, 43 kilometres (27 mi) of that distance consists of tunnels.

== Fires ==
In August 2013, a truck caught fire in the tunnel, resulting in 55 people being hospitalised. In August 2015, a tourist bus caught fire 500 metres (1,600 ft) from the exit. In March 2019, a truck burned down about 1.5 kilometres (0.93 mi) from the tunnel entry.
