= European route E16 =

Road in trans-European E-road network

E16

Route information
- Length: 1,180 km (730 mi)

Major junctions
- West end: Derry, United Kingdom
- East end: Kotka, Finland

Location
- Countries: United Kingdom, Norway, Sweden, Finland

Highway system
- International E-road network; A Class; B Class

European route E16 is the designation of a main west–east road through Northern Ireland, Scotland, Norway and Sweden, from Derry to Gävle, via Belfast, Glasgow, Edinburgh, previously by ferry to Bergen, Voss, through the Gudvanga Tunnel and the Lærdal Tunnel (the world's longest road tunnel), Lærdal, over Filefjell to Fagernes, Hønefoss, Gardermoen and Kongsvinger. In Sweden, it passes Malung, Falun and ends in Gävle.

== United Kingdom ==
- Northern Ireland
  - : Derry -
  - : - Antrim
  - : Antrim - Belfast (Multiplex with E1 and E18 between and Belfast)
- Great Britain
  - : Glasgow (Interchange with E5 at) - Edinburgh (Interchange with E15 at)

In Northern Ireland, it follows the A6 from Derry to Randalstown, then the M22 and M2 to Belfast. In Scotland, it follows the M8 from Glasgow to Edinburgh.

The E16 meets the E1 and E18 in Belfast, the E5 in Glasgow, the E15 in Edinburgh. European routes are not signposted in the UK. There is no ferry any more between the United Kingdom and Norway.

== Norway ==
The E16 is the main road between Norway's two largest cities Oslo and Bergen, and the only mountain pass between Oslo and Bergen that is rarely closed due to snowstorms and blizzards (it goes below the tree line). Outside winter, Route 7 is at least as popular between Oslo and Bergen, since it is shorter. There are some other options, such as the road through Hemsedal. The E16 is narrow at many places in Norway, although upgrades are being built.

The E16 is 630 kilometres (390 mi) long in Norway. The E16 has three end points, on the western end it meets the E39 in Bergen, near Hønefoss one spur turns south and meets the E18 at Sandvika, another spur goes east and meets the E6 at Gardermoen before continuing on to the Swedish border at Lundersæter.

== Sweden ==
E16 is 360 kilometres (220 mi) long in Sweden. E16 runs starts at the border with Norway near Vittjärn and runs together with the E45 between Torsby and Malung. E16 ends in Gävle where it meets the E4. There is no customs control at the Norway-Sweden border (but there is video surveillance), meaning that transports needing to be declared for customs, including most lorries, must be pre-cleared.

== History ==
The road number E16 was introduced in Norway in 1992, between Bergen and Oslo. The road Bergen–Oslo was called E68 in the old E-road system from 1950. In 1975, a new system was decided, where E16 only went through the United Kingdom (Derry–Edinburgh), and Bergen–Oslo was called E136. This was changed after several revisions of the agreement.

In 2011, it was decided to extend E16 from the Oslo region eastwards through Kongsvinger, Torsby, Malung, Borlänge to Gävle in Sweden. The signposting took place in the autumn of 2012.

A large road construction project was finished in 1992 when a new routing was opened almost all the way between Bergen and Voss. A further large project were the tunnels between Gudvangen and Lærdal which total around 43 km (27 mi), including the Lærdal Tunnel (the world's longest road tunnel), finished in 2000. In 2003–2017, the road from Lærdal and over the mountain pass was improved with five new tunnels of over one kilometre (0.62 mi) length, improving road quality and winter predictability.

In 2024, Finland proposes that the road be extended to the Finnish side. In Finland, the E16 road would be formed by highway 12 between Rauma-Kouvola and highway 15 between Kouvola-Kotka. Near Tampere, the E16 road would form a ring road. Finland's part of the E16 road would be about 400 kilometers. With the changes, the roads would be marked with the new E16 numbering in addition to their own national numbering. In October 2025, the President of Finland approved an amendment to the international agreement that allows the extension of European Route 16 to the Finnish side. The E16 road came into force in Finland on 5 March 2026.

== Gallery ==
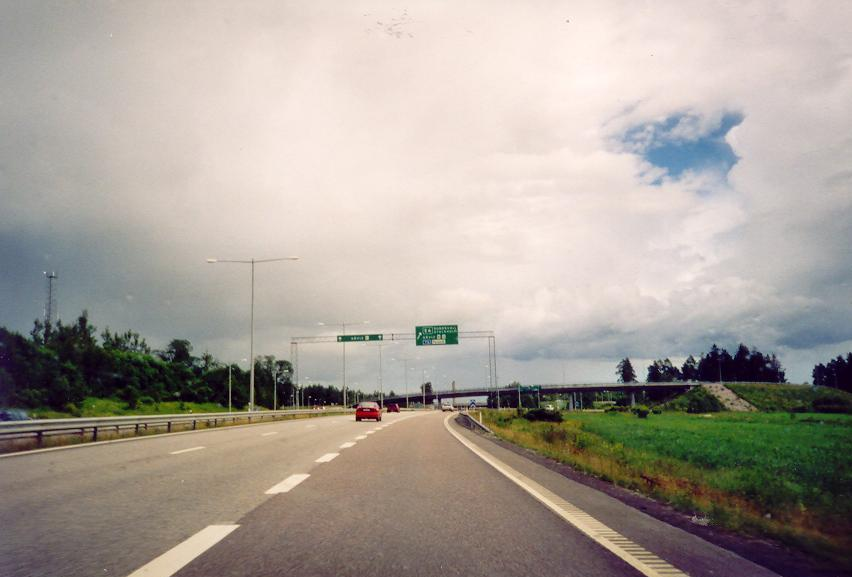
E16 west of Gävle

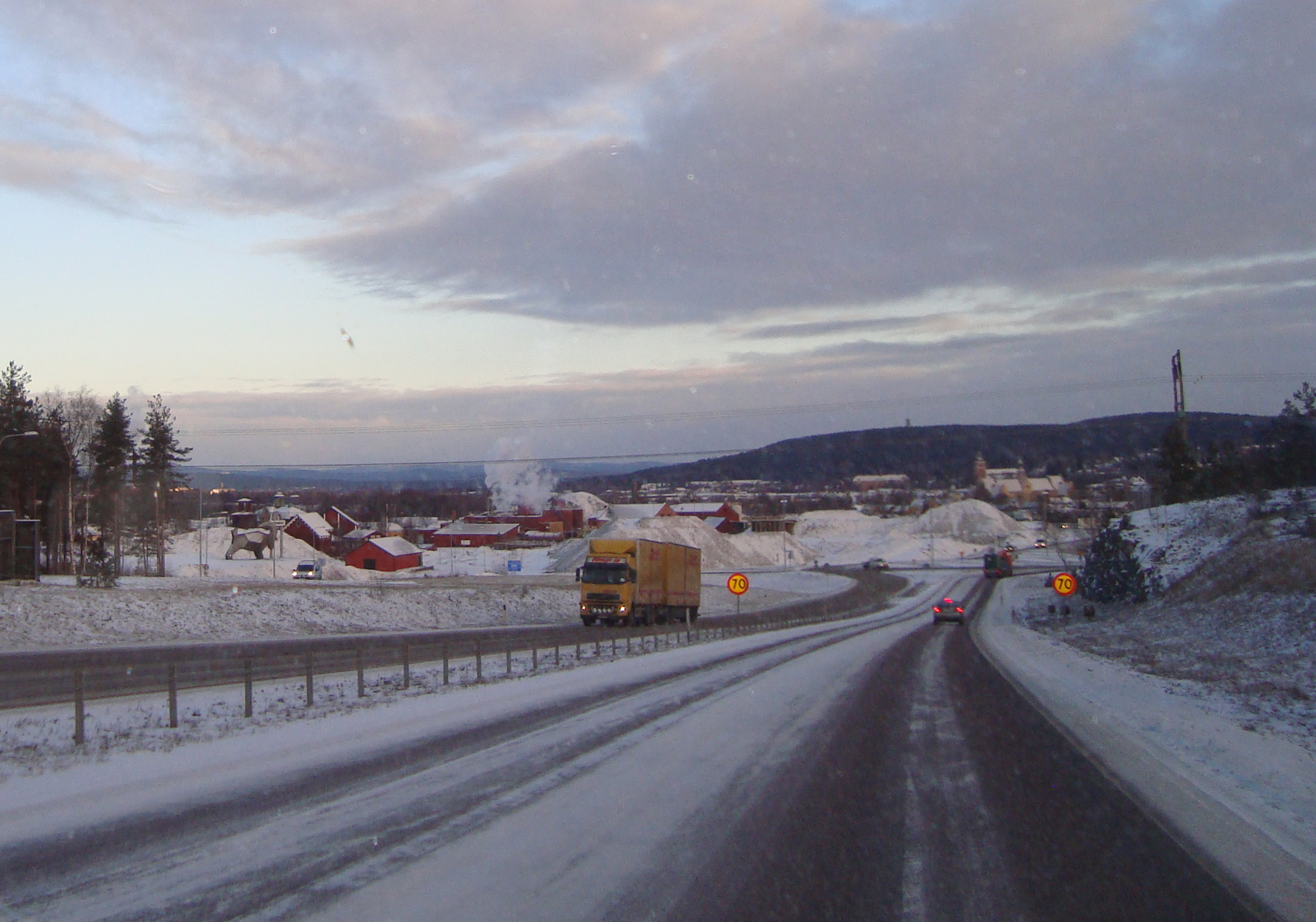
E16 near Falun in Sweden

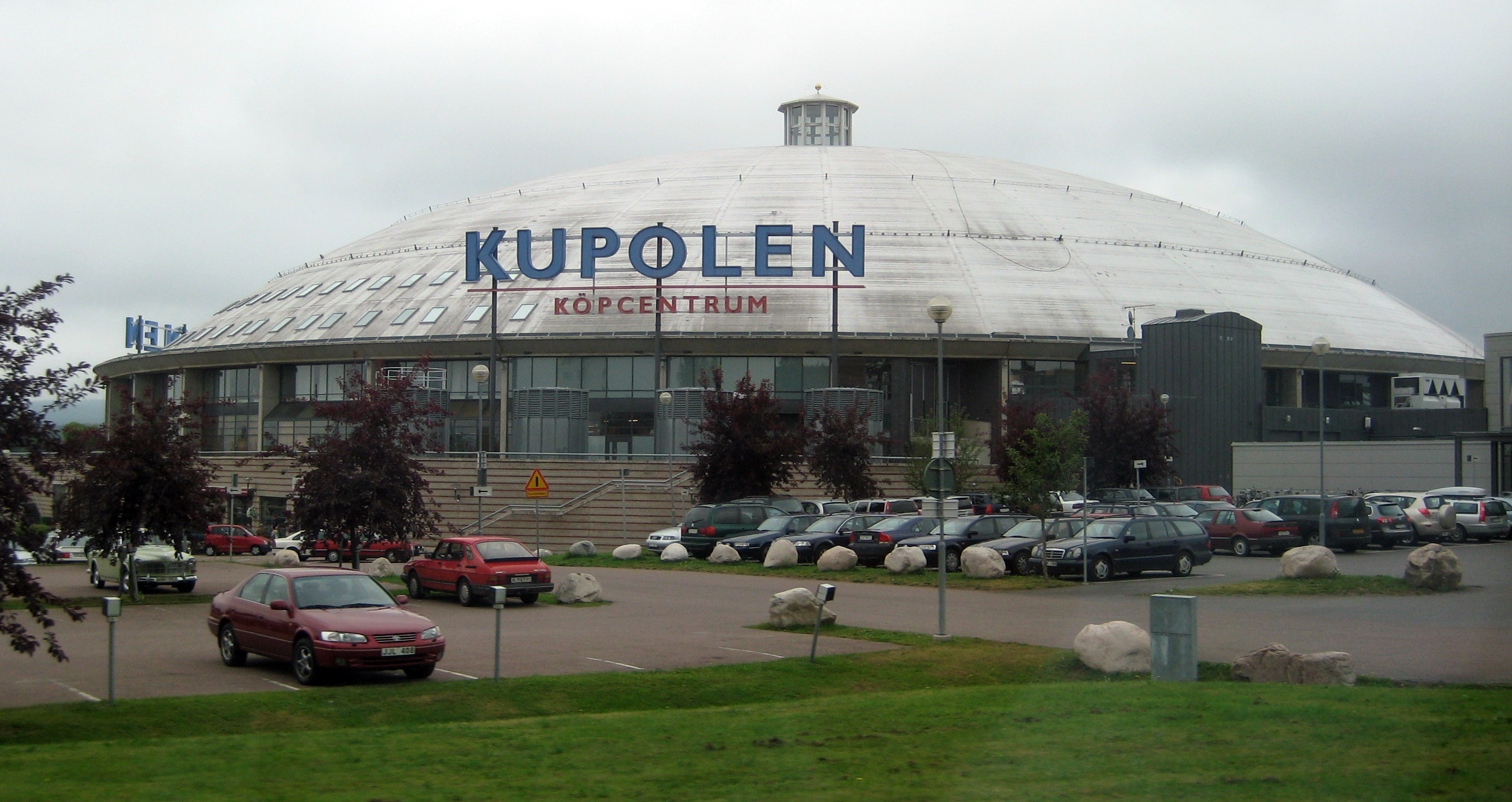
Kupolen shopping centre in Borlänge

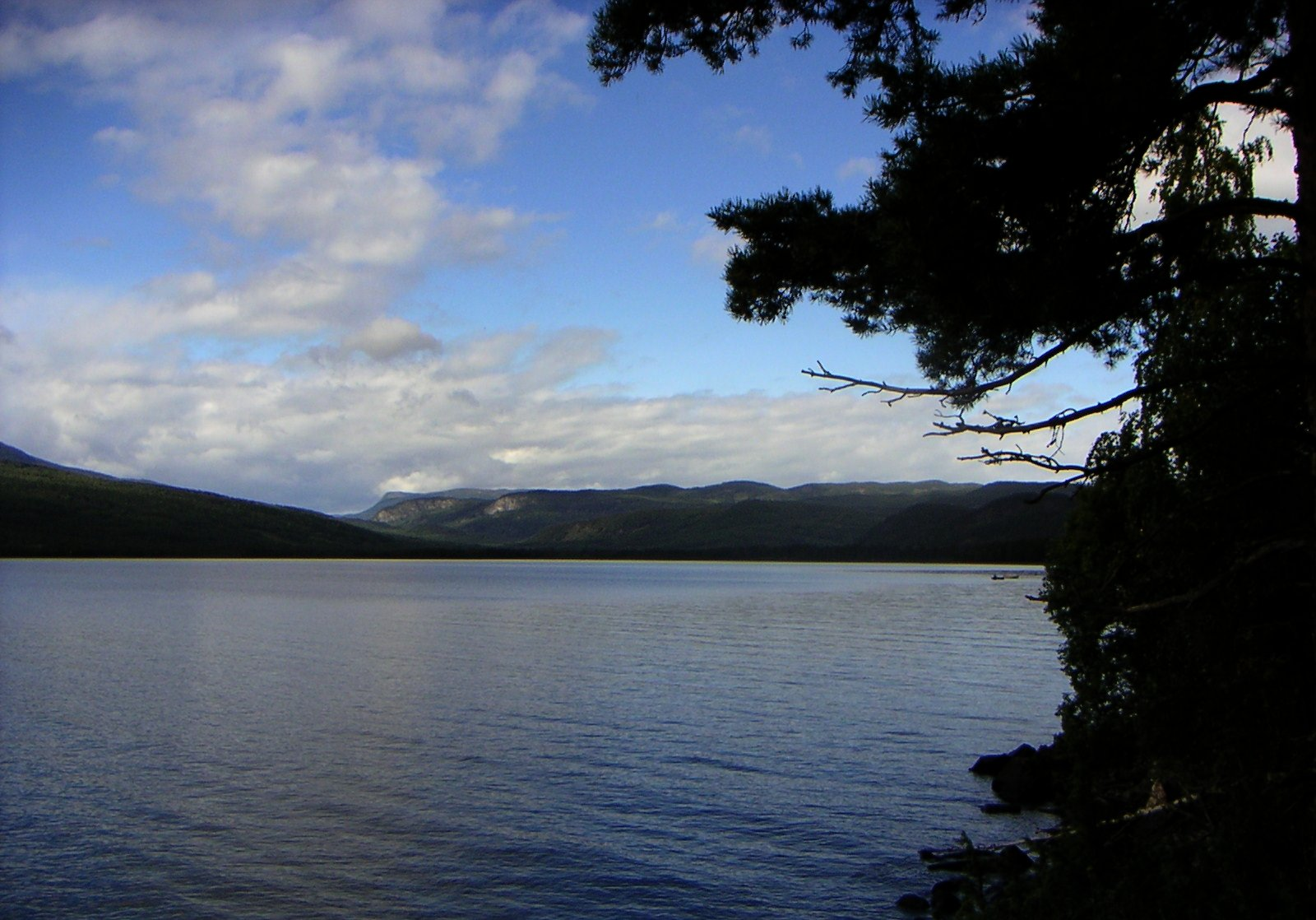
Scenic view over lake Sperillen

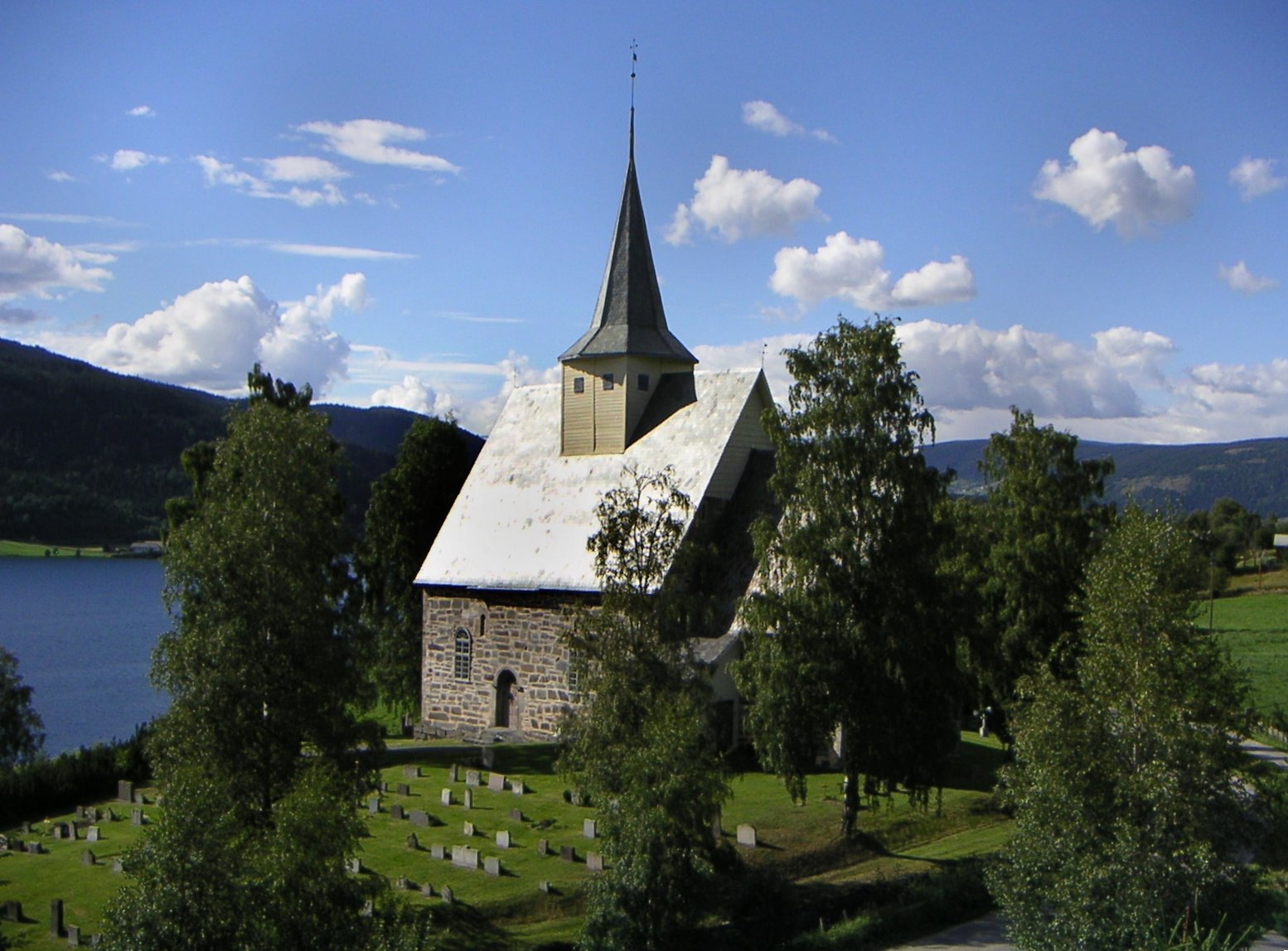
The mediaeval stone church Slidredomen

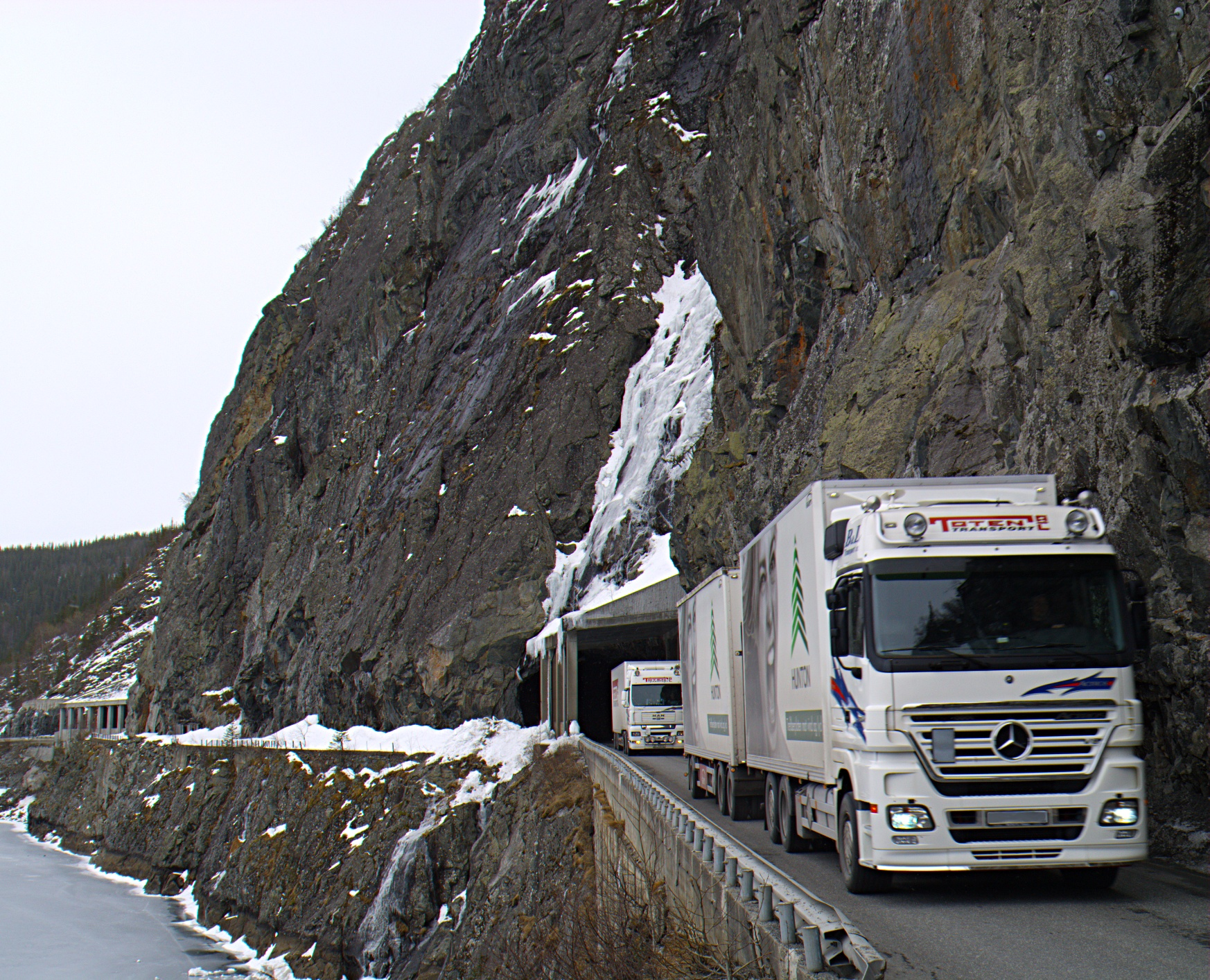
The Kvamskleiv tunnel and the Vangsmjøse lake in the mountains

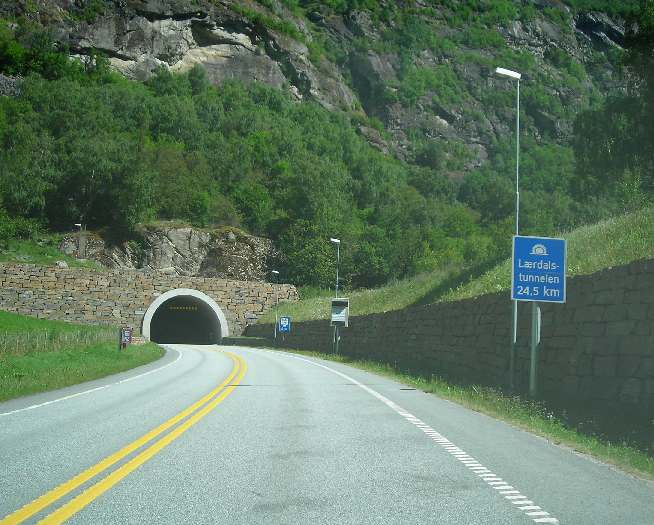
The Lærdal Tunnel is the longest road tunnel in the world, 24.5 km (15.2 mi).

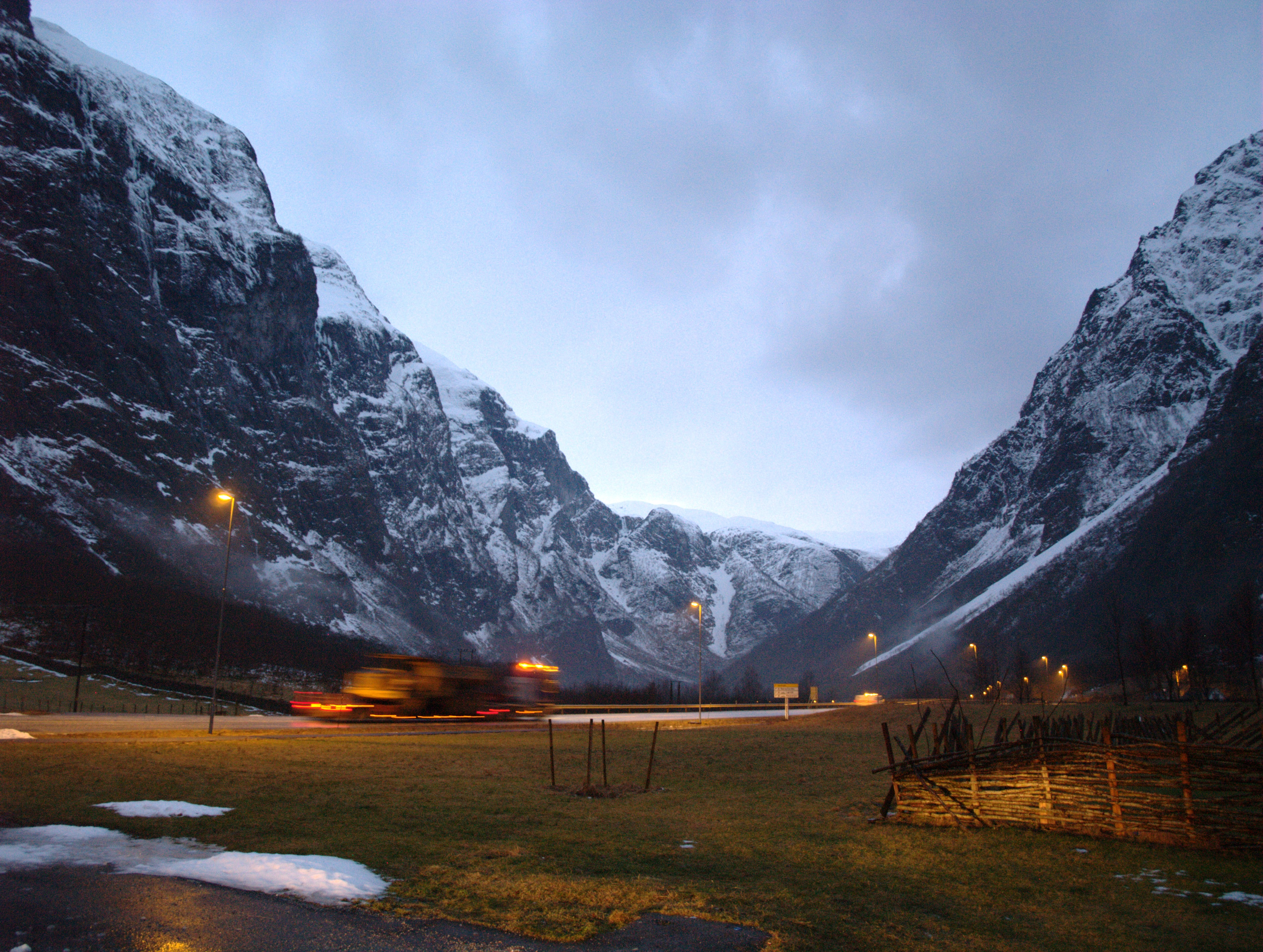
In the Aurland valley

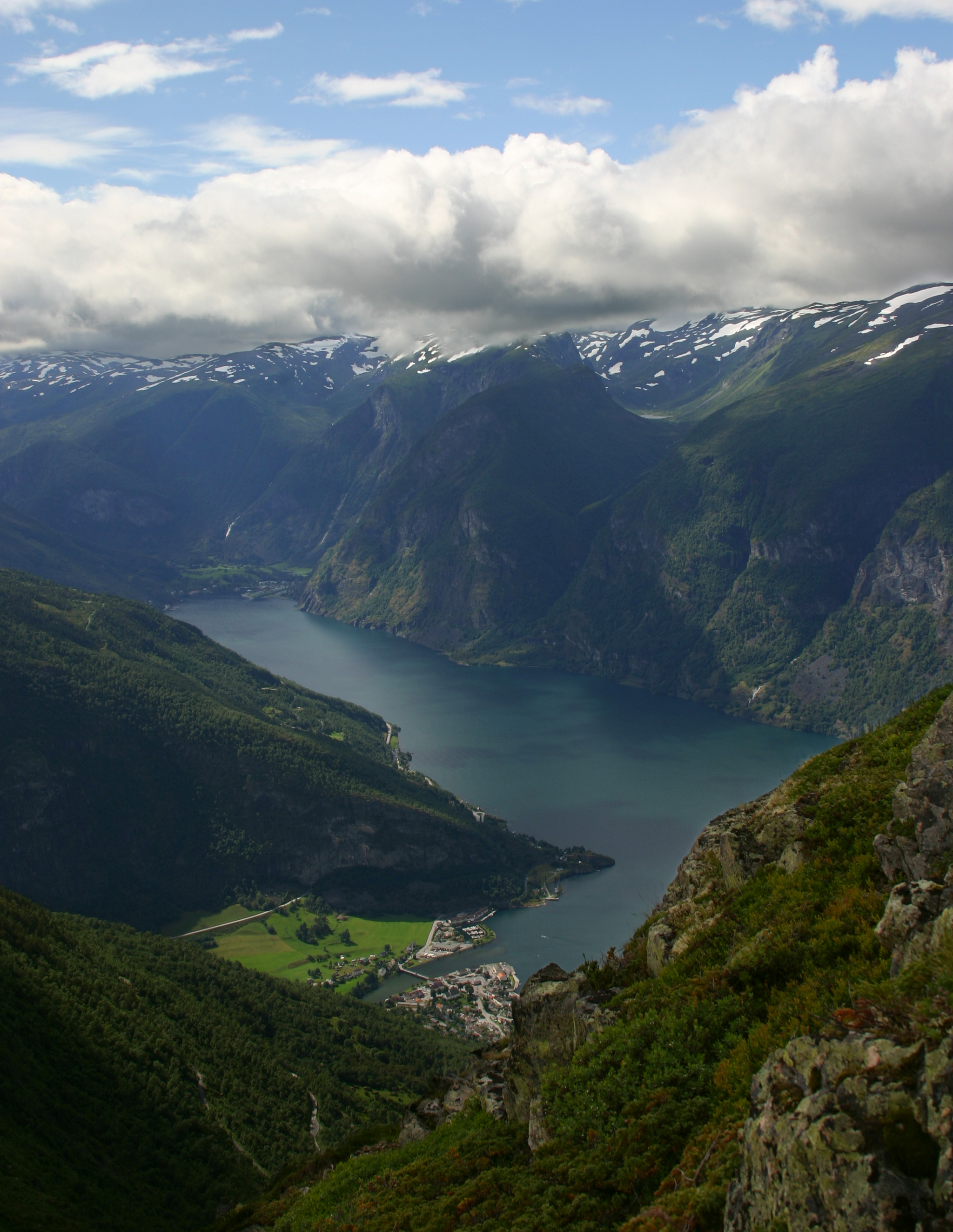
View over the Aurlandsfjord with Flåm innermost in the fiord

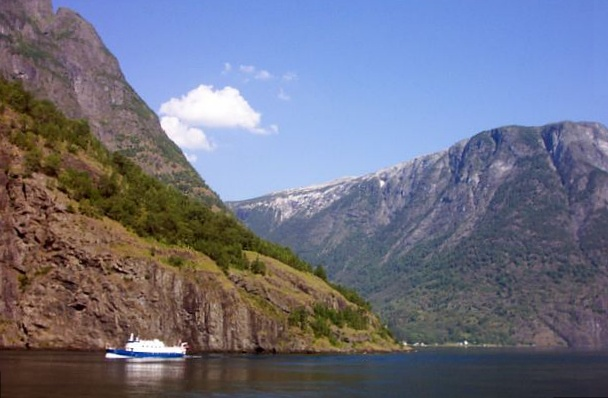
Nærøyfjord is on the list of World Heritage Sites

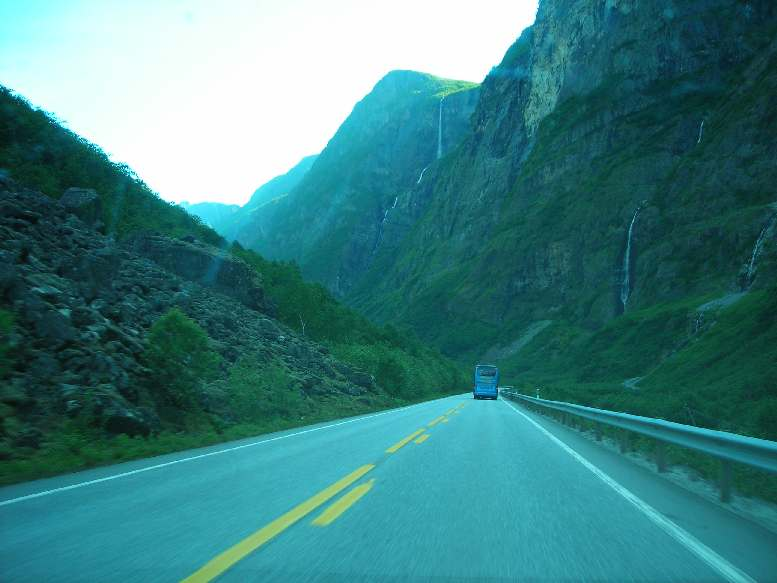
E16 near Gudvangen in Norway

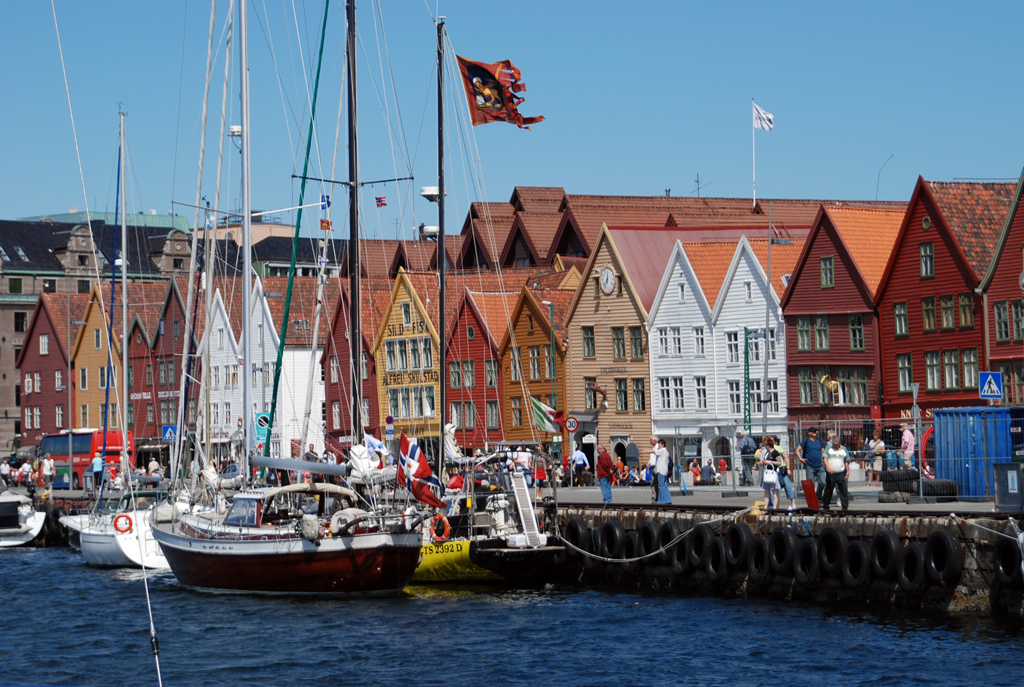
Bryggen in Bergen, Norway

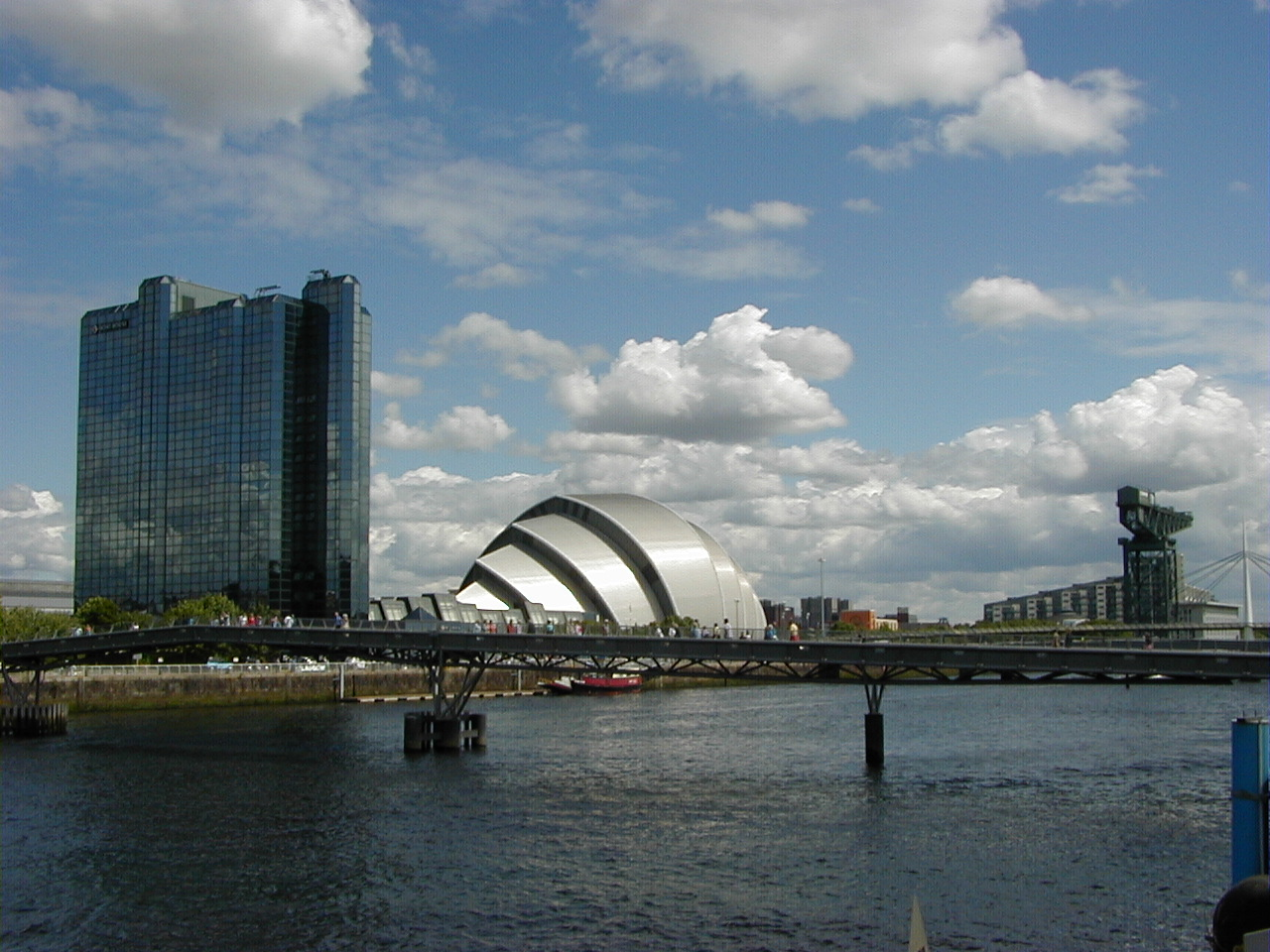
Clyde in Glasgow

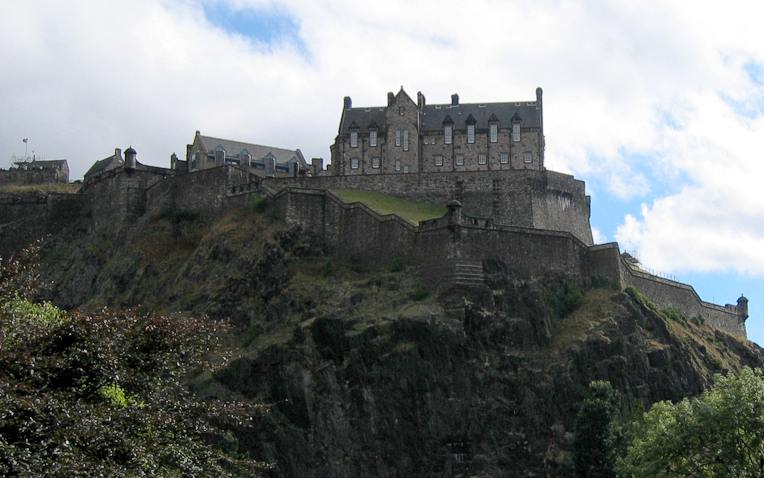
Edinburgh Castle in Edinburgh

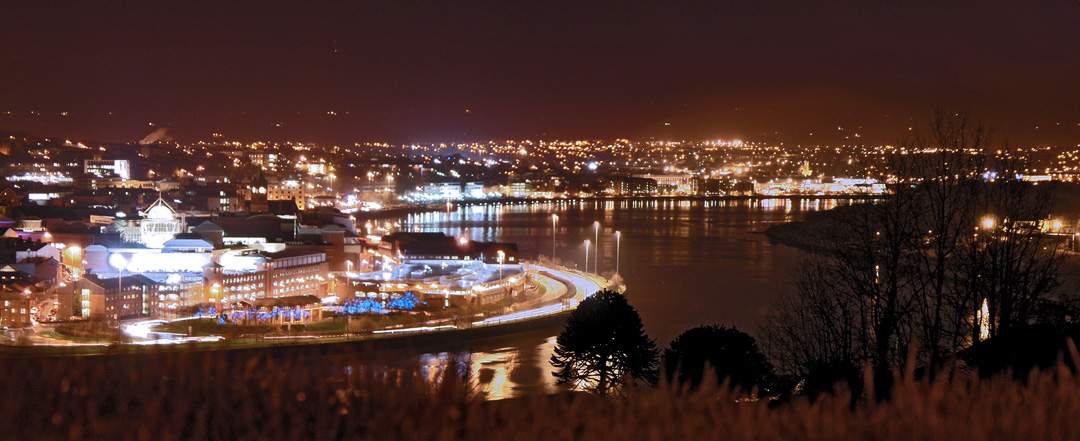
River Foyle in Derry
