= Veslehorn =

Mountain in Norway

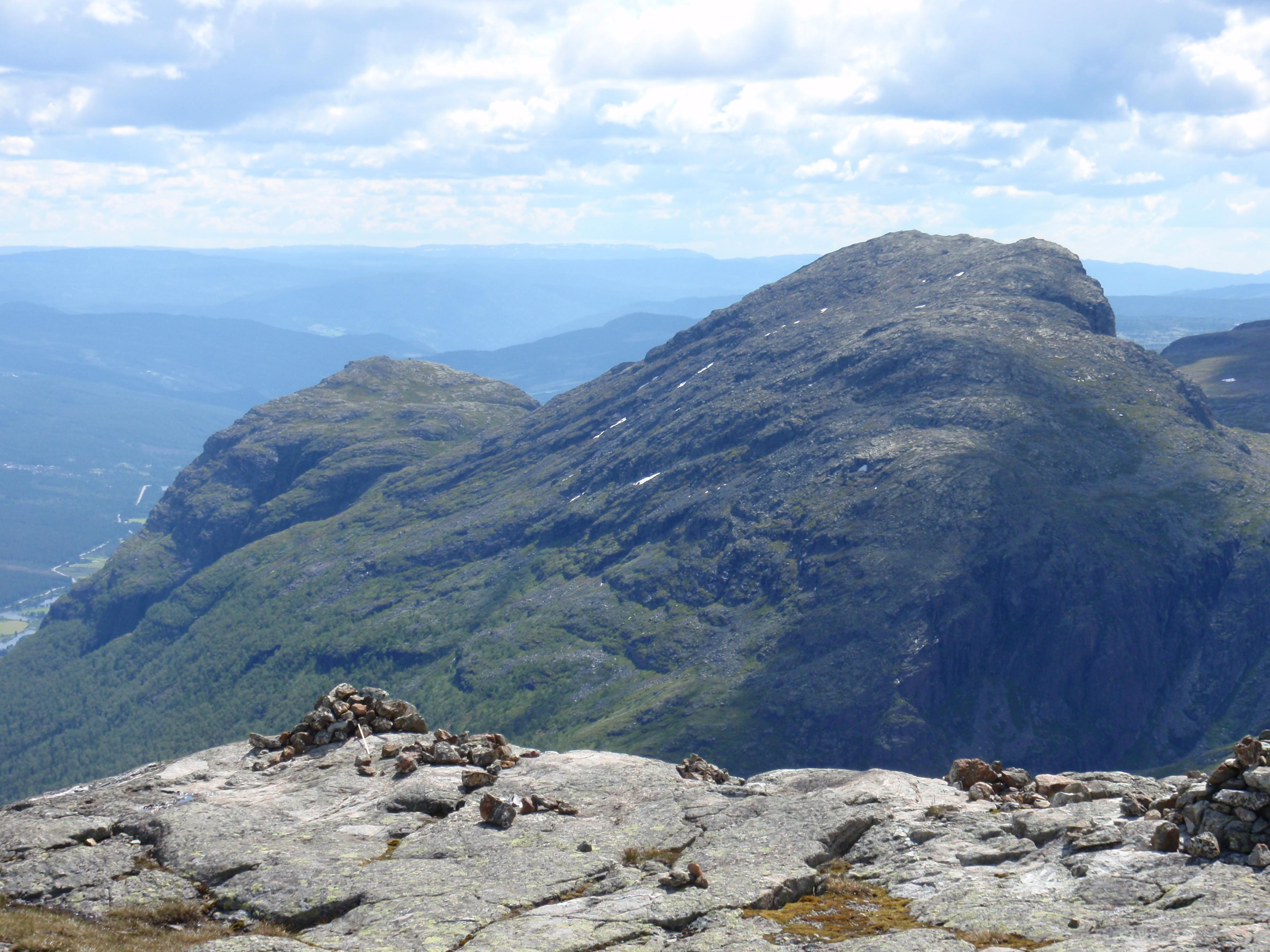
- Veslehorn (left) as it looks in the summer, seen from Totten. Storehorn to the right.

Highest point
- Elevation: 1,300 m (4,300 ft)
- Coordinates: 60°49′1″N 8°37′1″E

Geography
- Location: Hemsedal (Buskerud)
- Topo map: 1616 IV Hemsedal

Veslehorn, also written Veslehødn, is a mountain located in the Hemsedal municipality in Norway. It is a part of Hemsedal Top 20.
