= Harahorn =

Mountain in Norway

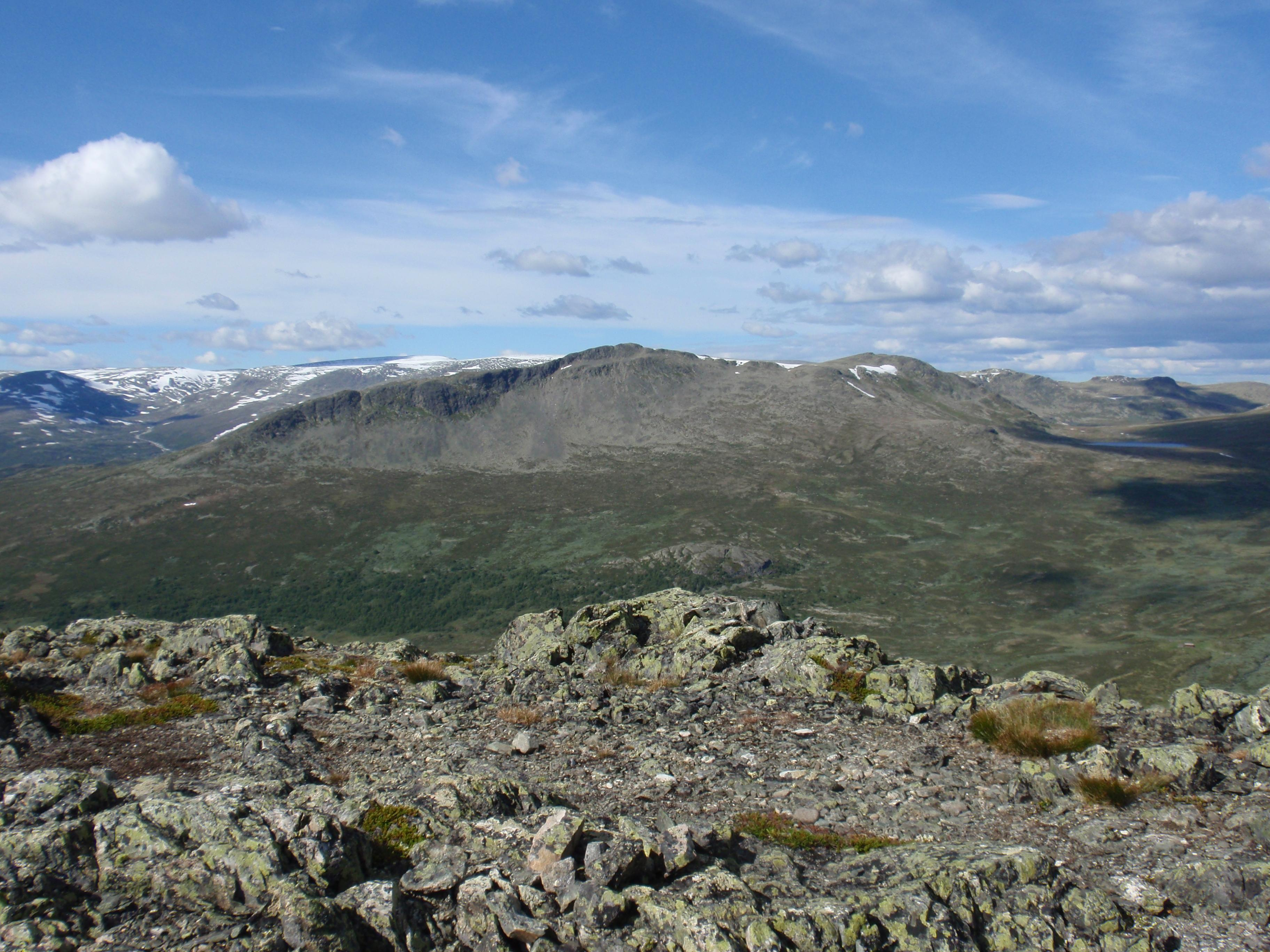
- Harahorn seen form the mountain Kvitingane (south) in the summer.

Highest point
- Elevation: 1,581 m (5,187 ft)
- Coordinates: 60°56′27″N 8°29′37″E

Geography
- Location: Hemsedal (Buskerud)
- Topo map: 1616 IV Hemsedal

Harahorn, also written Harahødn, is a mountain located in the Hemsedal municipality in Norway. It is a part of Hemsedal Top 20.
