= Rauber =

Rauber is a surname. Notable people with the surname include:

- Francis D. Rauber (1901–1991), American second sergeant major of the Marine Corps
- François Rauber (1933–2003), French pianist, composer, arranger and conductor
- Karl Rauber (1866–1909), Swiss painter
- Karl-Josef Rauber (born 1934), German cardinal of the Catholic Church
- Paul Rauber, American environmentalist
- Ty Rauber (1905–1949), American football player, Navy commander and special agent with the FBI

See also

- Rauberflaket, a mountain of Buskerud, in southern Norway
