= Bjørnbakknosi =

Mountain in Norway

Highest point
- Elevation: 1,555 m (5,102 ft)
- Coordinates: 60°54′16″N 8°37′24″E

Geography
- Location: Buskerud, Norway

Bjørnbakknosi is a hill in Hemsedal in Buskerud, Norway. It is located northwest of Grunnane, northeast of Skurvefjellet and south of Veslebotnskarvet.
