= Nibbi =

Mountain in southern Norway

Highest point
- Elevation: 1,741 m (5,712 ft)
- Coordinates: 60°52′36″N 8°38′22″E

Geography
- Location: Buskerud, Norway

Nibbi is a mountain in the county of Hemsedal municipality Buskerud, in southern Norway, Europe.

== Tourism ==
Nibbi mountain gets good quality of snow and is popular during skiing season.
