= Skarvanfjellet =

Mountain in Norway

Highest point
- Elevation: 1,735 m (5,692 ft)
- Coordinates: 60°53′23″N 8°40′21″E

Geography
- Location: Buskerud, Norway

Skarvanfjellet is a mountain in Hemsedal municipality, Buskerud, in southern Norway.
