= Skogshorn =

Mountain in Norway

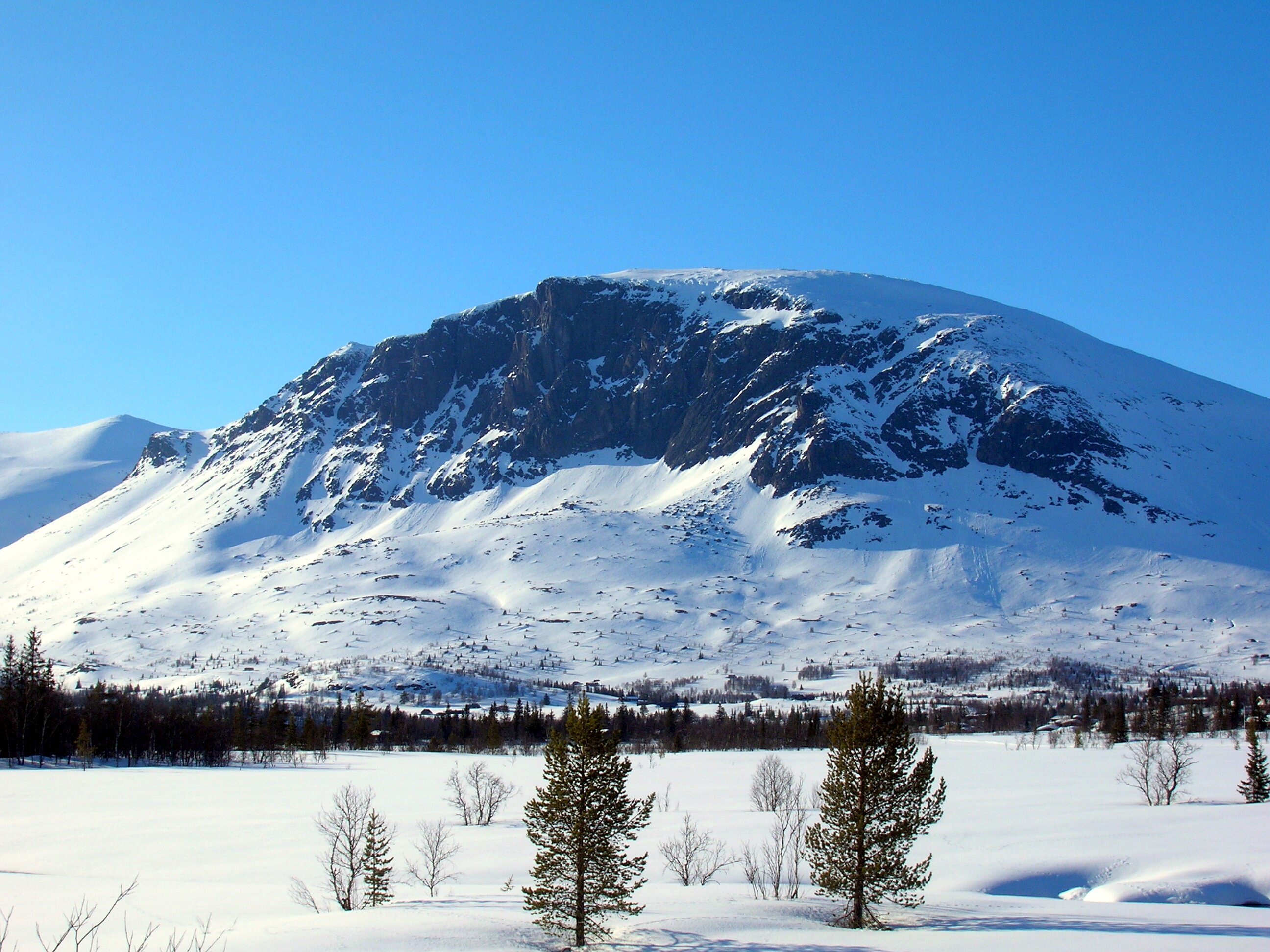

Highest point
- Elevation: 1,728 m (5,669 ft)
- Coordinates: 60°52′59″N 8°41′44″E

Geography
- Location: Hemsedal (Buskerud)), Norway
- Topo map: 1616 IV Hemsedal

Skogshorn, also written Skogshødn, is a mountain in the municipality Hemsedal in the county Buskerud.

Skogshorn is a part of Hemsedal Top 20.

The summit of Skogshorn is a popular destination for day-trips both summer and winter. The east-side approach requires no climbing, and is popular for families and other mountain tourists. The south-side of the mountain can be climbed, and is used for ice climbing in winter.
