= Storebottskarvet =

Mountain in Norway

Highest point
- Coordinates: 60°51′52″N 8°13′39″E

Geography
- Location: Buskerud, Norway

Storebottskarvet is a mountain in Ål and Hemsedal municipalities, Buskerud, in southern Norway.
