= Storehorn =

Mountain in Norway

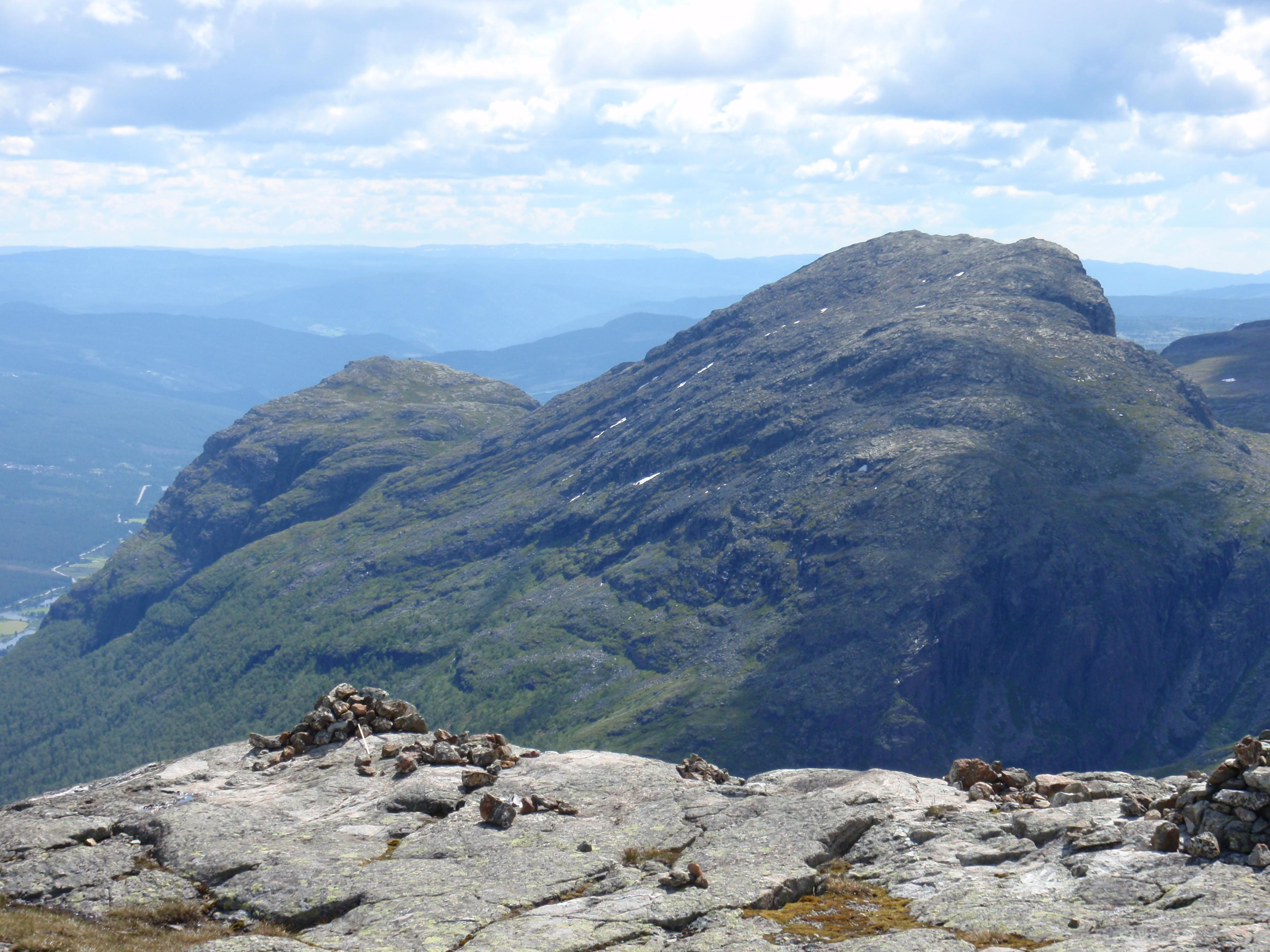
- Storehorn (right summit) in the summer as seen from Totten.

Highest point
- Elevation: 1,482 m (4,862 ft)
- Coordinates: 60°49′1″N 8°35′36″E

Geography
- Location: Hemsedal (Buskerud)
- Topo map: 1616 IV Hemsedal

Storehorn, also written Storehødn, is a mountain located in the Hemsedal municipality. It is a part of Hemsedal Top 20.
