= Trøym =

Settlement in Hemsedal Municipality, Norway

Coordinates: 60.862°N 8.554°E

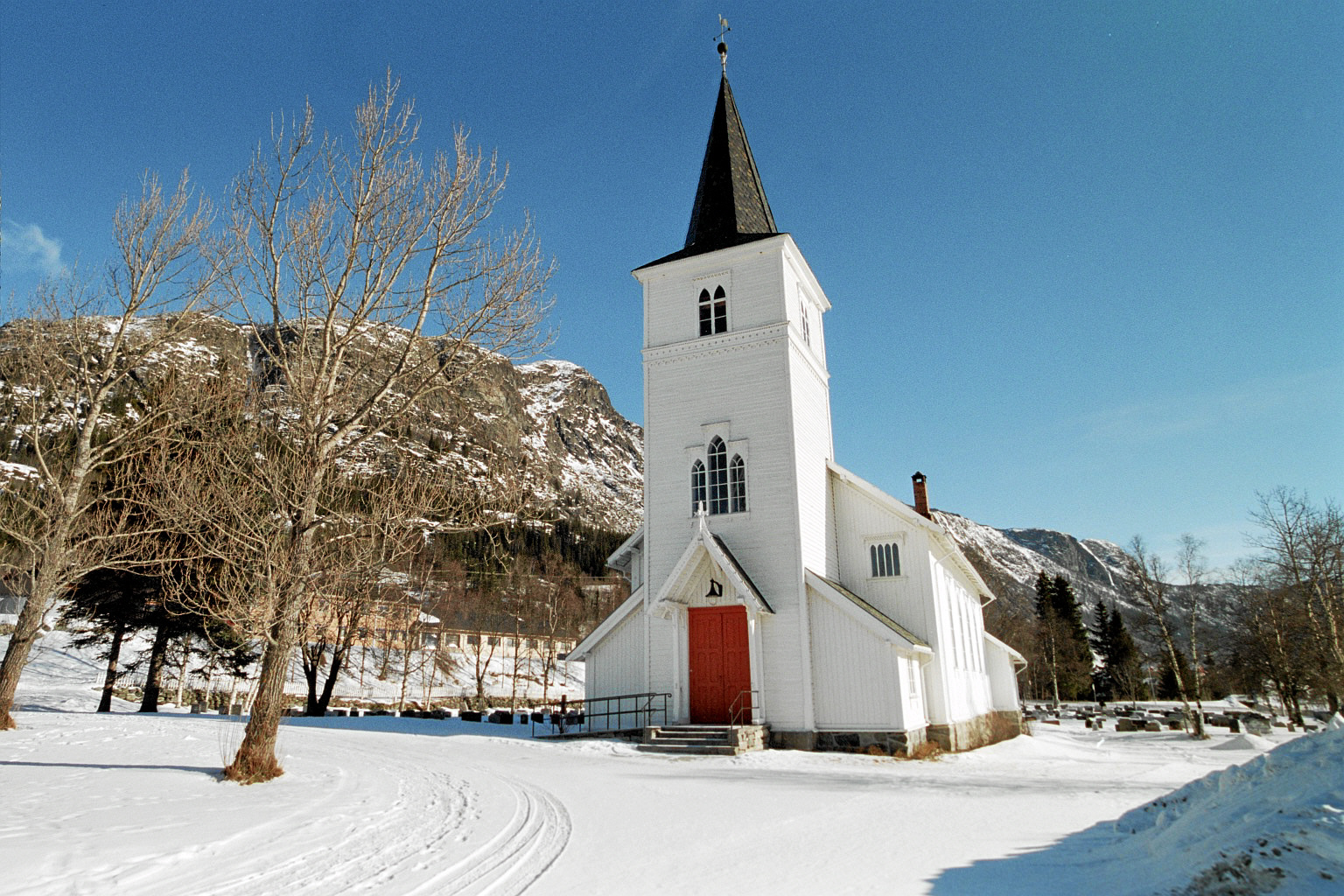
Hemsedal Church at Trøym

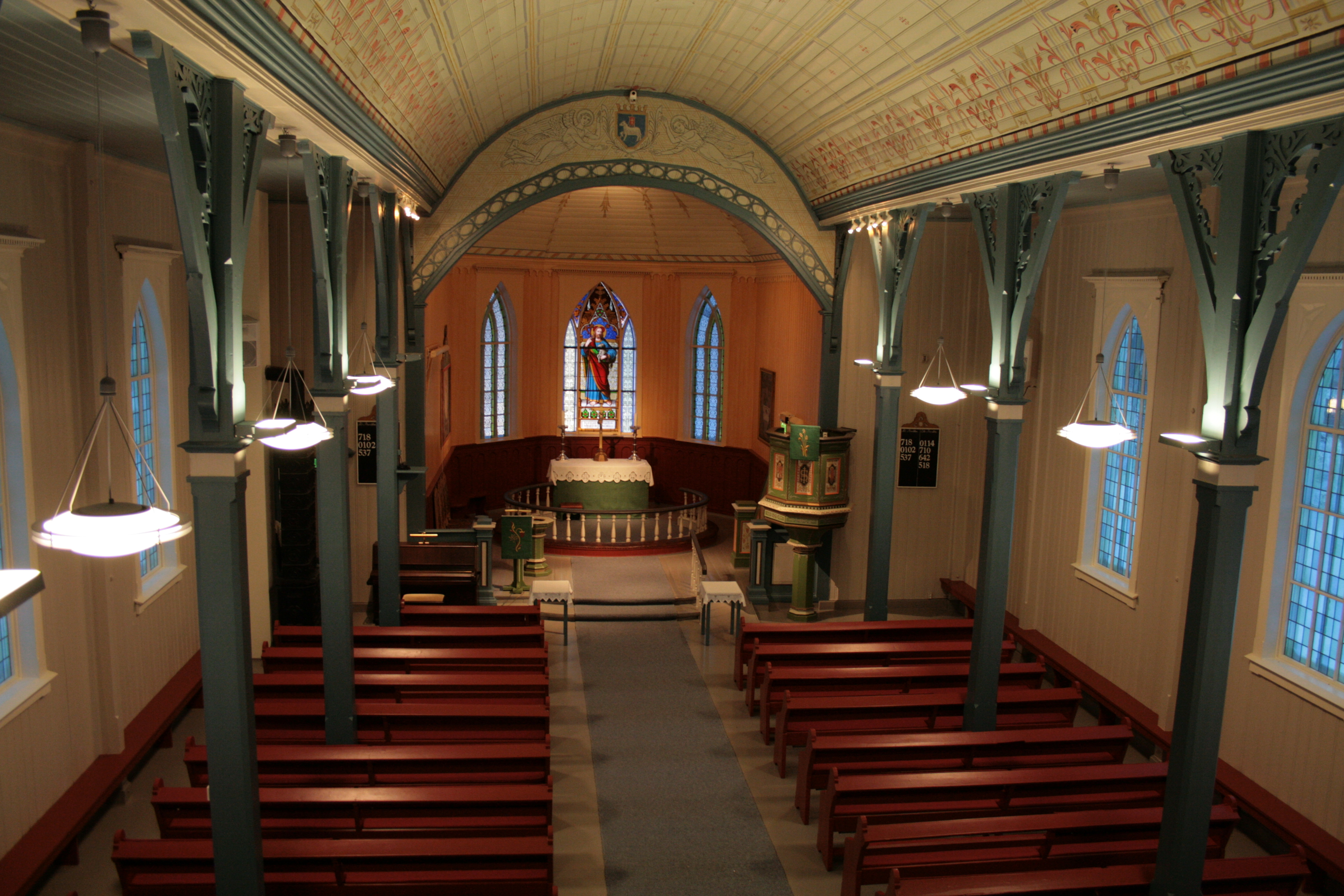
Interior of Hemsedal Church

Trøym is a village and the site of the administrative center of Hemsedal municipality in Buskerud county, Norway.

Trøym is located in the traditional region of Hallingdal. It is situated on the Hemsila River which runs through the valley of Hemsdal to Gol where it joins the Hallingdalselva. Trøym is located on Norwegian National Road 52 (Rv52) (Gol-Hemsedal-Borlaug) which runs between the junction with Norwegian National Road 7 (RV7) at Gol to the junction with European route E16 near Borlaug in Sogn og Fjordane. Trøyma is situated about 200 km from Oslo and 270 km from Bergen.

Hemsedal Church (Hemsedal kirke) dates from 1882. It is designed by architect, Johannes Henrik Nissen. It was constructed of wood and has 420 seats. Access to the site is via Rv52.

== Climate ==
Climate data for Hemsedal II 1991–2020 (604 m, average high/low 2006-2025)
| Month | Jan | Feb | Mar | Apr | May | Jun | Jul | Aug | Sep | Oct | Nov | Dec | Year |
|---|---|---|---|---|---|---|---|---|---|---|---|---|---|
| Mean daily maximum °C (°F) | −3.7 (25.3) | −1 (30) | 3.3 (37.9) | 8 (46) | 13.7 (56.7) | 18.4 (65.1) | 20 (68) | 17.8 (64.0) | 13.7 (56.7) | 6.9 (44.4) | 0.8 (33.4) | −2.7 (27.1) | 7.9 (46.2) |
| Daily mean °C (°F) | −7.3 (18.9) | −6.6 (20.1) | −2.8 (27.0) | 1.9 (35.4) | 6.7 (44.1) | 11 (52) | 13.4 (56.1) | 11.7 (53.1) | 7.8 (46.0) | 2 (36) | −3.2 (26.2) | −7.1 (19.2) | 2.3 (36.2) |
| Mean daily minimum °C (°F) | −12.5 (9.5) | −11.5 (11.3) | −7.5 (18.5) | −3.2 (26.2) | 1.1 (34.0) | 5.6 (42.1) | 8.1 (46.6) | 6.8 (44.2) | 3.7 (38.7) | −1 (30) | −6.1 (21.0) | −11.1 (12.0) | −2.3 (27.8) |
Source 1: yr.no (mean)
Source 2: seklima (average high/low)
