= Hemsedal Top 20 =

Coordinates: 60°56′18″N 8°11′28″E

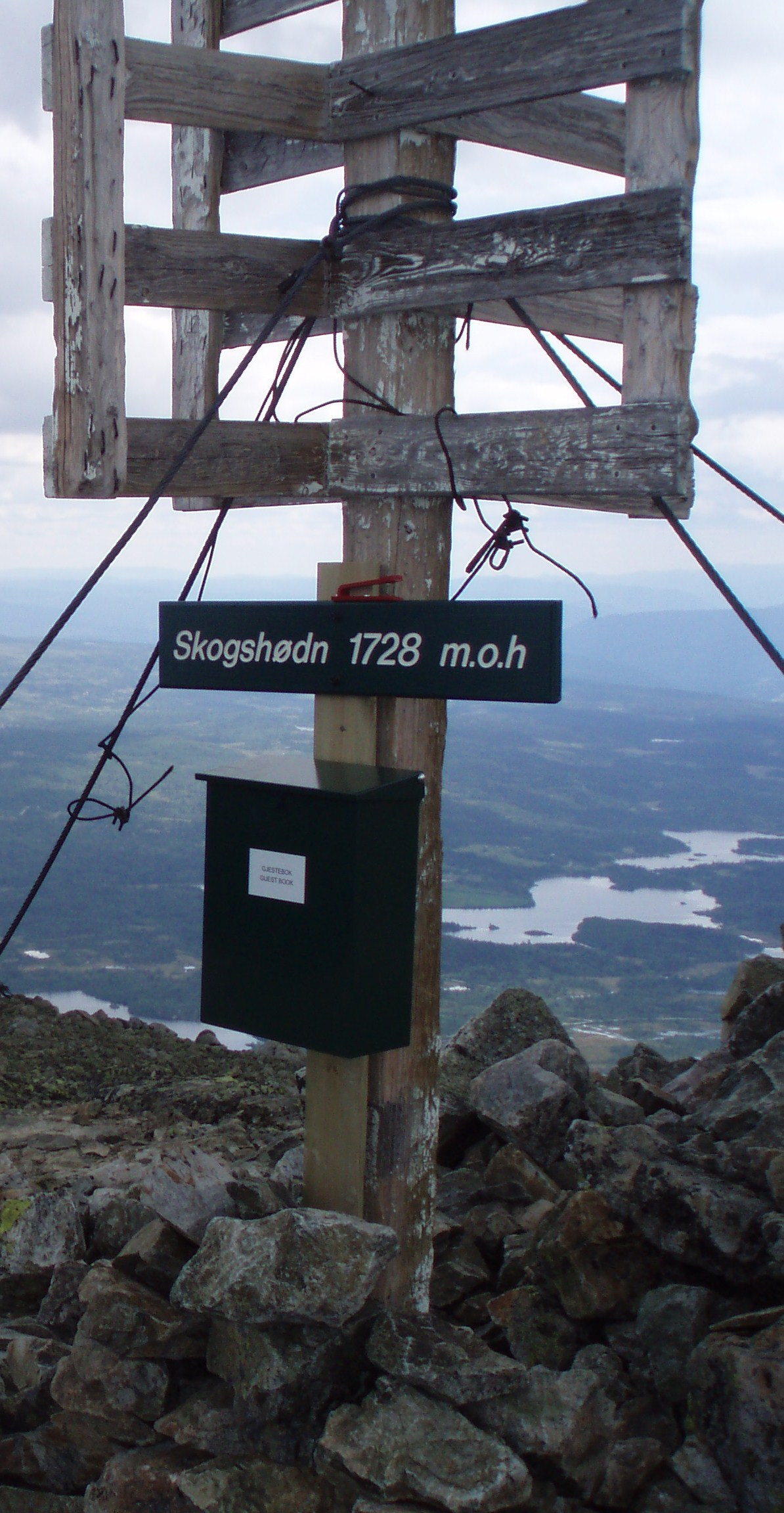
Signpost and green box at the top of mount Skogshorn.

Hemsedal Top 20 is an organisation of twenty mountains in the Hemsedal fell that preferably can be climbed during the summer time. The twenty peaks are each signposted with the name of the peak and the trail leading to the top is marked with either blue-painted stones or a series of cairns. A green box is situated on each peak containing a guest book.

== Categorization ==
The peaks are divided into four categories: green, blue, red and black. The green category contains the easiest peaks and the black contains the peaks, where the hike is very demanding. The number following a peak's name is its height measured in metres AMSL.

=== Green Category ===
- Venåshøvda (988)
- Høllekølten (804)
- Karisetberget (837)

=== Blue Category ===
- Gjeiteberget (834)
- Storhøvda (1075)
- Steget (920)
- Totten (1497)
- Raudberg (1486)

=== Red Category ===
- Harahødn (1581)
- Røggjin (1370)
- Bjøbergnøse (1468)
- Kvitingatn (1426)
- Svarthetta (1553)
- Skogshødn (1728)
- Veslehødn (1300)
- Storehødn (1482)

=== Black Category ===
- Kyrkjebønnøse (1671)
- Ranastøngji (1900)
- Storbøttskaret (1656)
- Høgeløft (1920)
