= Kjell Venås =

Norwegian philologist (1927–2018)

Kjell Venås (30 November 1927 – 7 March 2018) was a Norwegian philologist.

He was born in Hemsedal, and took his dr.philos. degree in 1967. He spent most of his career at the University of Oslo; as a lecturer from 1970 to 1971 and professor from 1971 to 1997. Specializing in research about the Nynorsk language form, Venås has also been involved in the Norwegian Language Council. He was a member of the Norwegian Academy of Science and Letters. He died in March 2018.

== Selected bibliography ==
This is a list of his most notable works:

- Hallingmålet (1977)
- Mål og miljø (1982)
- For Noreg og Ivar Aasen. Gustav Indrebø i arbeid og strid (1984)
- Norsk grammatikk. Nynorsk (1990)
- I Aasens fotefar. Marius Hægstad (1992)
- Då tida var fullkomen. Ivar Aasen (1996)
