= Svøo =

Village in Buskerud, Norway

Coordinates: 60°50′25″N 8°37′36″E

Svøo is a village in Hemsedal municipality, Norway. It is located in the traditional region of Hallingdal. Svøo is located on the river Hemsil which flows into the Hallingdalselva. Svøo is about five miles from the center of Hemsedal. Its population is 241.

== Climate ==
Climate data for Hemsedal II 1991–2020 (604 m, average high/low 2006-2025)
Month	Jan	Feb	Mar	Apr	May	Jun	Jul	Aug	Sep	Oct	Nov	Dec	Year
Mean daily maximum °C (°F)	−3.7 (25.3)	−1 (30)	3.3 (37.9)	8 (46)	13.7 (56.7)	18.4 (65.1)	20 (68)	17.8 (64.0)	13.7 (56.7)	6.9 (44.4)	0.8 (33.4)	−2.7 (27.1)	7.9 (46.2)
Daily mean °C (°F)	−7.3 (18.9)	−6.6 (20.1)	−2.8 (27.0)	1.9 (35.4)	6.7 (44.1)	11 (52)	13.4 (56.1)	11.7 (53.1)	7.8 (46.0)	2 (36)	−3.2 (26.2)	−7.1 (19.2)	2.3 (36.2)
Mean daily minimum °C (°F)	−12.5 (9.5)	−11.5 (11.3)	−7.5 (18.5)	−3.2 (26.2)	1.1 (34.0)	5.6 (42.1)	8.1 (46.6)	6.8 (44.2)	3.7 (38.7)	−1 (30)	−6.1 (21.0)	−11.1 (12.0)	−2.3 (27.8)
Source 1: yr.no (mean)
Source 2: seklima (average high/low)
