= Skurvefjellet =

Mountain in Norway

Highest point
- Coordinates: 60°53′20″N 8°36′27″E

Geography
- Location: Buskerud, Norway

Skurvefjellet is a mountain of Hemsedal municipality, Buskerud, in southern Norway.
