= Hege Nerland =

Norwegian politician

Hege Nerland (27 October 1966 – 12 March 2007) was a Norwegian politician for the Socialist Left Party.

In 2003 she helped found the local party chapter in her native Hemsedal. She worked with organic farming there, and had organizational experience from the Norwegian Farmers and Smallholders Union and Via Campesina. She was elected to the municipality council the same year, and became deputy mayor of Hemsedal. Following the 2005 Norwegian parliamentary election, she served as a deputy representative to the Norwegian Parliament from Buskerud. In November 2006, however, she had to relinquish her political positions due to illness. She died four months later.
