= Bygdemål =

Group of Norwegian dialects

Bygdemål (originally termed landsmål by Ivar Aasen, used before 1929, when landsmål began to refer to Nynorsk as a written language) refers to traditional Norwegian dialects spoken outside of cities in Norway, in contrast to the cities' spoken languages.

== Details ==
Bygdemål often encompass a wider range of sounds and have less resemblance to Dano-Norwegian and the standard written languages, Bokmål and Nynorsk. This is in contrast to Bymål (city language), which is characterized by the dialects in the cities.

== Examples of Bygdemål ==
- Hallingmål
- Opplandsk
- Jærsk
- Ringeriksmål
- Saltendialekt
