= Leinenosi =

Mountain in Norway

Coordinates: 60°55′21″N 8°32′18″E

Geography
- Location: Buskerud, Norway

Leinenosi is a mountain in the municipality of Hemsedal in Buskerud, Norway.
