= Hemsedalsfjella =

Mountain in Norway

Coordinates: 60°55′N 8°25′E

Geography
- Location: Buskerud, Norway

Hemsedalsfjella (English: The Hemsedal mountains) are the mountains that surrounds Hemsedal Valley in Buskerud, Norway. Most of the Hemsedal mountains is in Hemsedal municipality.
