= Hydalsberget =

Mountain in Norway

Highest point
- Elevation: 1,775 m (5,823 ft)
- Coordinates: 60°59′4.13″N 8°30′22.14″E

Geography
- Location: Buskerud, Norway

Hydalsberget is a mountain in the municipality of Hemsedal in Buskerud, Norway.
