= Langebottfjellet =

Mountain in Norway

Coordinates: 60°52′28″N 8°9′32″E

Highest point
- Elevation: 1,685 m (5,528 ft)
- Prominence: 90 m (300 ft)

Geography
- Location: Buskerud, Norway

Langebottfjellet is a mountain located in the municipalities of Ål and Hemsedal in Buskerud, Norway.
