= Hallingmål-Valdris =

Group of Norwegian dialects

- Halling, Hallingdøl, Valdresmål
- Native to: Norway
- Region: Hallingdal, Valdres
- Language family: Indo-European: Germanic; Northwest Germanic; North Germanic; West Scandinavian; Norwegian; Eastern Norwegian; Midland Norwegian; Hallingmål-Valdris

Language codes
- ISO 639-3: –
- Glottolog: None
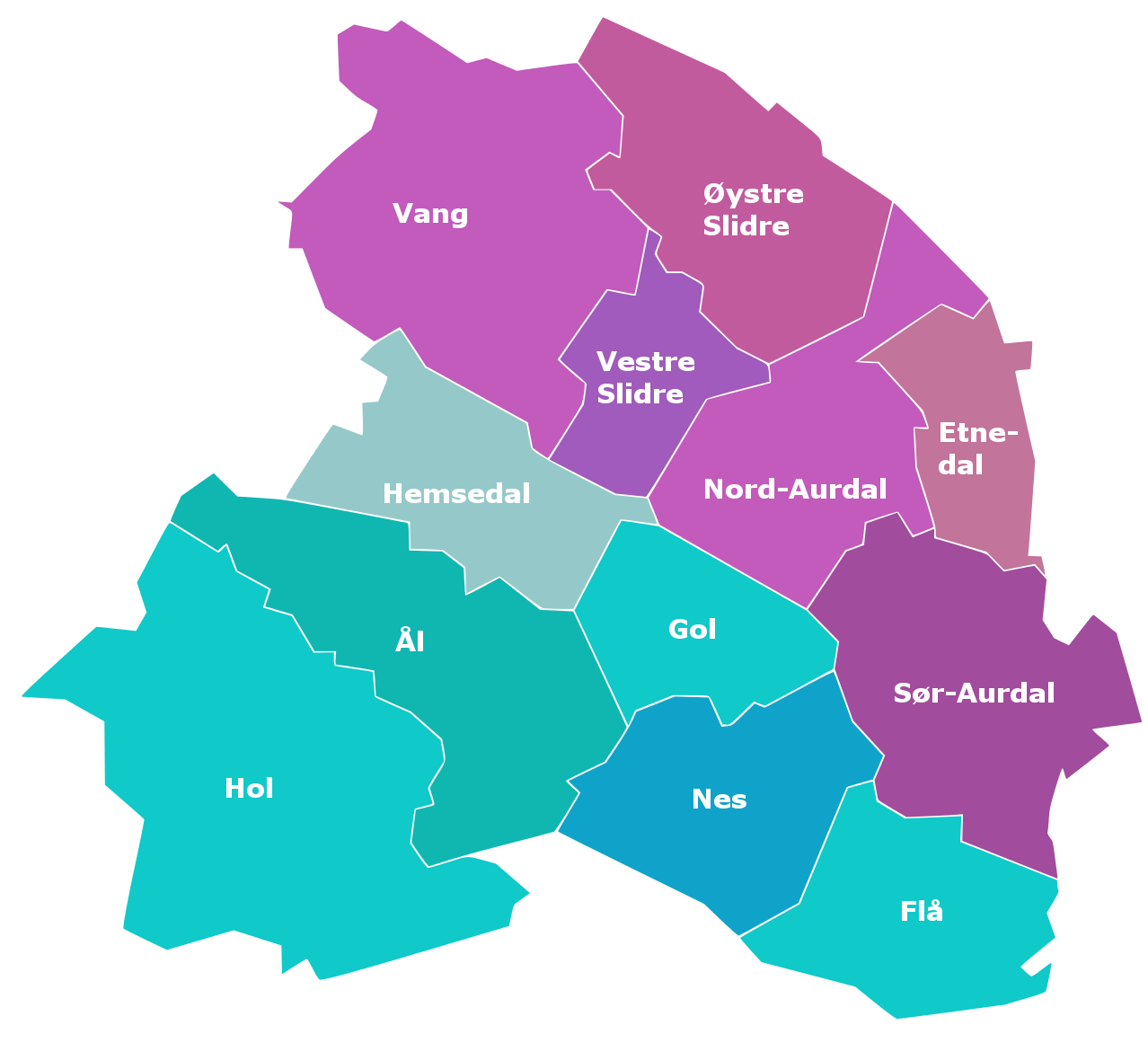
- Administrative map of Hallingdal and Valdres Valdres Hallingdal

Hallingmål-Valdris (also known by the individual names Halling, Hallingdøl, or Valdresmål) is a group of Norwegian dialects traditionally spoken in the traditional districts of Hallingdal in Buskerud county and Valdres in Innlandet county. (Note: The southern villages Begnadalen and Hedalen in Sør-Aurdal Municipality (Valdres) don't speak Valdris, as their dialect is closer to the Ringerike dialect.)

== Phonology ==
=== Consonants ===
- /rn/ is usually realized as a prestopped nasal [dn̩], while the allophone [ɳ] only occurs in words like baren ([bɑːɳ]) "the bar". (Note: It may also be realized as [tn̩] in Hemsedal Municipality, Gol Municipality, and the southern villages in Valdres, although this only occurs in plural definite form.)
- /rl/ also has a prestopped realization [dl].
- The phoneme which is commonly called thick L (written /ɽ/ in IPA), exists in words that had either ⟨l⟩ or ⟨rð⟩ in Old Norse. In Vang Municipality, /ɽ/ occurs only in the first case.
- The consonant clusters ⟨sk⟩, ⟨skj⟩, and ⟨sj⟩ were not pronounced as [ʂ], only ⟨-rs-⟩ was. Sørbygdi in Flå Municipality pronounces ⟨sj⟩ as [ʂ], while Gulsvik pronounces it as [ʂj].
- The consonant clusters ⟨sl⟩ and ⟨tl⟩ were mostly assimilated to [sl]. Hol Municipality and Ål Municipality assimilated these to [l̥], and Sørbygdi in Flå Municipality assimilated ⟨sl⟩ to [ʂl].
- The clusters ⟨-ld⟩, ⟨-nd⟩ and ⟨-mb⟩ are pronounced as spelled.
- The Old Norse cluster ⟨-fn⟩ is pronounced as assimilated [bdn] or [bn].

=== Vowels ===
- The back vowels [ʊ, uː] and [ɔ, oː] in older Hallingmål-Valdris were pronounced as in Old Norse, without the vowel shift to, respectively, [ʉ, ʉː] and [ʊ, uː] that is found in most other Norwegian dialects.
- The short Old Norse vowels ⟨o⟩ and ⟨ö⟩ are pronounced as central [ɞ] almost everywhere, except for Ål Municipality (but not Torpo), where these are back [ɔ]. In Valdres (except for Vang Municipality), the schwa /ə/ can also be realized as [ɞ].
- Traditionally, /æ, æː/ were pronounced as open-mid [ɛ, ɛː].
- The words pronounced [e(ː)] and [ɛ(ː)] mean "I" and "am", respectively.
- Itacism is found in southern Hallingdal (Flå Municipality, Nesbyen Municipality and some in Gol Municipality), making the vowel /yː/ to be unrounded to [iː].
- The Old Norse diphthongs ⟨ei⟩, ⟨ey⟩ and ⟨au⟩ are traditionally pronounced as [aɪ̯], [ɔʏ̯] ([eɪ̯] in southern Hallingdal) and [aʊ̯]. This is occurs today especially in upper Valdres and Hol Municipality, and Ål Municipality.

== Grammar ==
Declension of nouns (Note: The IPA used here is with the traditional diphthongs, and the vowel shift.)
| Gender | | Singular | | | Plural | | |
| Gender | | Indefinite | Definite | Dative | Indefinite | Definite | Dative |
|---|---|---|---|---|---|---|---|
| Feminine | Strong (with i- declension) | [suːɽ] | [suːɽɛ] | [suːɳ] | [ˈsuːˈɽɛ], (Note: Only used in Valdres.) [ˈsuːˈɽi] (Note: Only used in Hallingdal and the southern villages in Valdres.) | [ˈsuːɽˈidn̩] | [ˈsuːˈɽu] |
| Feminine | Strong (with a-decl.) | [jaɪ̯t] | [ˈjaɪ̯ˈtɛ] | [ˈjaɪ̯ˈtn̩] | [jaɪ̯ta] | [ˈjaɪ̯ˈtadn̩] | [ˈjaɪ̯ˈtu] |
| Feminine | Weak (with u-decl.) | [ˈjɛnˈtɛ] | [ˈjɛnˈta] | [ˈjɛnˈtʉn] | [ˈjɛnˈtʉ] | [ˈjɛnˈtʉdn̩] | [ˈjɛnˈtu] |
| Masculine | Strong (with a-decl.) | [gʉːt] | [gʉːtn̩] | [gʉːta] | [ˈgʉːˈta] | [ˈgʉːˈtadn̩] | [ˈgʉːˈtu] |
| Masculine | Strong (with i-decl.) | [griːs] | [griːsn̩] | [ˈgriːˈsɛ] | [ˈgriːˈsɛ], [ˈgriːˈsi] | [ˈgriːˈsidn̩] | [griːsu] |
| Masculine | Weak (with a-decl.) | [ˈbakˈkɛ] | [ˈbakˈkin] | [ˈbakˈka] | [ˈbakˈka] | [ˈbakˈkadn̩] | [ˈbakˈku] |
| Neutrum | Strong | [hʉːs] | [hʉːsɛ] | [ˈhʉːˈsɛ] | [hʉːs] | [hʉːsɛ] | |
| Neutrum | Weak | [aʊ̯ga] | [aʊ̯ga(ə)] | [aʊ̯gaɛ] | [aʊ̯gʉ], (Note: Only used in Hallingdal.) [aʊ̯gu] | [aʊ̯gu], [aʊ̯gʉdn̩] | [aʊ̯gu] |

Personal pronouns
| Person | Subjective case | Objective case | Dative case | Possessive | | | | | | | | | | | |
| Person | Subjective case | Objective case | Dative case | Feminine | | | | Masculine | | | | Neuter | | | |
| Person | Subjective case | Objective case | Dative case | Subj./Obj. | | Dative | | Subj./Obj. | | Dative | | Subj./Obj. | | Dative | |
| Person | Subjective case | Objective case | Dative case | Sg. | Pl. | Sg. | Pl. | Sg. | Pl. | Sg. | Pl. | Sg. | Pl. | Sg. | Pl. |
|---|---|---|---|---|---|---|---|---|---|---|---|---|---|---|---|
| 1st p. sg. | [eː] | [meː] | [meː] | [miː] | [ˈmiːˈnə] | [ˈmiːˈnə] | [miː] | [mɪn] | [ˈmiːˈnə] | [ˈmiːˈnə] | [miː] | [mɪt] | [ˈmiːˈnə] | [ˈmiːˈnə] | [miː] |
| 2nd person sg. | [dʉː] | [deː] | [deː] | [diː] | [ˈdiːˈnə] | [ˈdiːˈnə] | [diː] | [dɪn] | [ˈdiːˈnə] | [ˈdiːˈnə] | [diː] | [dɪt] | [ˈdiːˈnə] | [ˈdiːˈnə] | [diː] |
| 3rd p. sg. f. | [huː], [ˈhuːˈna] | [huː], [ˈhuːˈna] | [ˈhɛnˈnɛ], [n] | [ˈhɛnˈnɛ(r)] ([ˈhɛnˈnar]), (Note: These forms are used interchangeably, though Hallingdal only uses the first, without the r.) [ˈhɛnˈnɛs] (Note: Only used in Nord-Aurdal Municipality, Sør-Aurdal Municipality, and Etnedal Municipality.) | | | | | | | | | | | |
| 3rd p. sg. m. | [han], [n] | [han], [n] | [huːnu], [u] | [has] | | | | | | | | | | | |
| 3rd p. sg. n. | [dɛ] | [dɛ] | [di] | [siː] | [ˈsiːˈnə] | [ˈsiːˈnə] | [siː] | [sɪn] | [ˈsiːˈnə] | [ˈsiːˈnə] | [siː] | [sɪt] | [ˈsiːˈnə] | [ˈsiːˈnə] | [siː] |
| 1st p. pl. | [meː], [mɞː] (Note: Only used in Valdres, except for Vang Municipality.) | [ʉs], [ɞs] (Note: Only used in Sør-Aurdal Municipality.) | [ʉs], [ɞs] | [voːr] | | | | [voʈ] | | [ˈvoːˈre] (Note: In the older dialects of Vang and Slidre, [ˈvoːˈra] has been used for feminine, but is not used today.) | | | | | [ˈvoːˈru] |
| 2nd p. pl. | [deː], [dɞː] | [ˈdikˈka(n)], [ˈdikˈku(n)] (Note: Only used in Hol Municipality and Ål Municipality.) | [ˈdikˈka(n)], [ˈdikˈku(n)] | [ˈdikˈka(n)], [ˈdikˈku(n)] | | | | | | | | | | | |
| 3rd p. pl | [daɪ̯] | [daɪ̯] | [daɪ̯] | [ˈdaɪ̯ˈris], [ˈdeːˈris], [ˈdeːˈres] | | | | | | | | | | | |

== See also ==
- Bygdemål

== Citations ==
=== Literature ===
- Jahr, Ernst Håkon (1990). Den Store dialektboka (in Norwegian). Oslo: Novus. ISBN 8270991678.
- Kvåle, Karen Marie (1999). Dè è'kji gøtt veta ko dai saia: talemålsendring i Valdres (in Norwegian). Oslo: Valdreslaget i Oslo. ISBN 8299538505.
- Ross, Hans (1907). Norske bygdemaal. 3-6: Oust-telemaal o numedalsmaal; Hallingmaal o valdresmaal; Gudbrandsdalsmaal; Upplandsmaal (in Norwegian). Christiania: Kommission hos Jacob Dybwad.
- Skjekkeland, Martin (1997). Dei norske dialektane: tradisjonelle særdrag i jamføring med skriftmåla (in Norwegian). Kristiansand: Høyskoleforlaget. ISBN 8276341039.
- Strand, Thea Randina (2009). Varieties in Dialogue: Dialect Use and Change in Rural Valdres, Norway. The University of Arizona. ISBN 978-1109104257.
- Venås, Kjell (1977). Hallingmålet (in Norwegian). Oslo: Samlaget. ISBN 8252107176.
