= Totten (mountain) =

Mountain in Norway

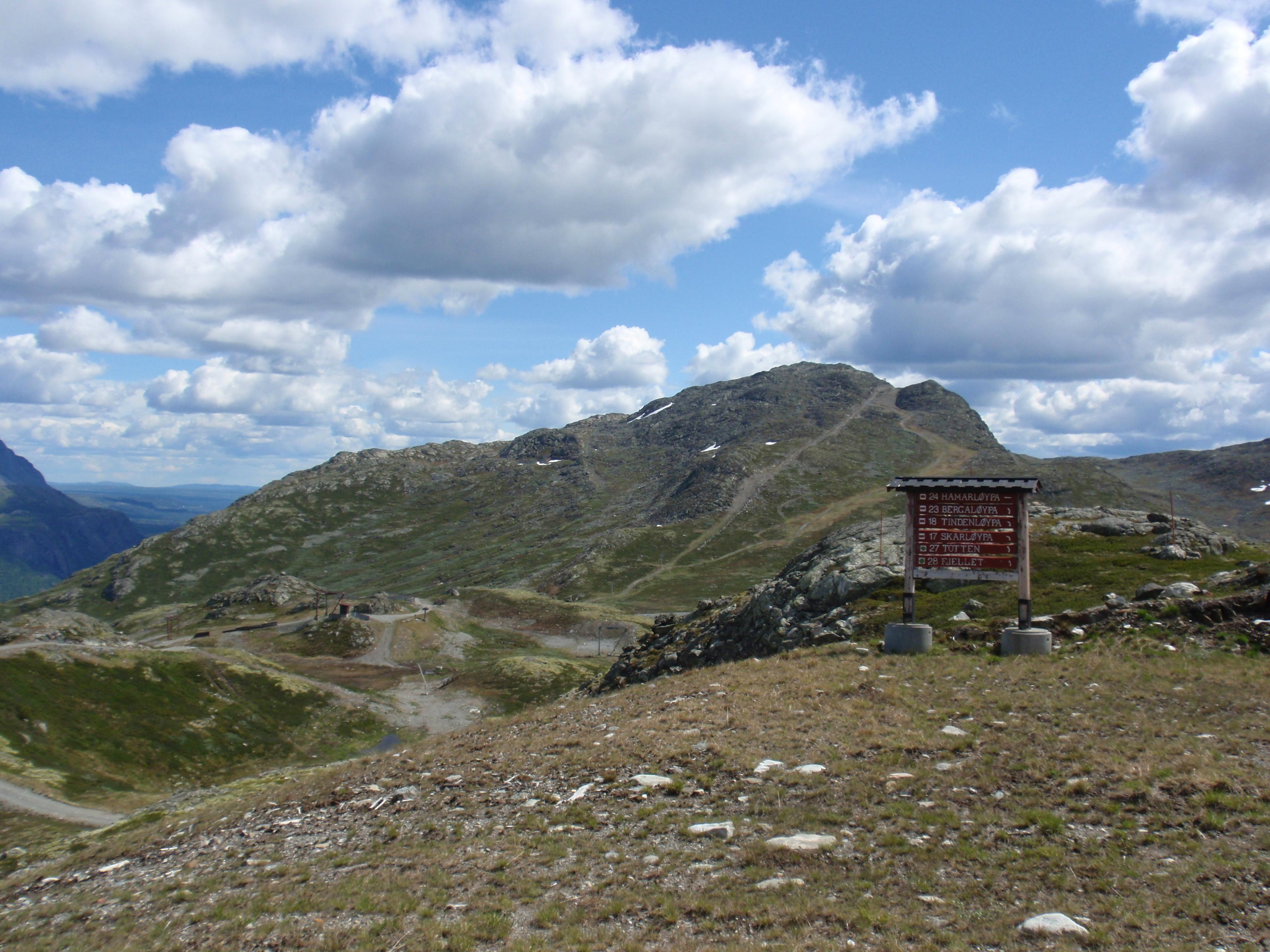
- Totten seen from the slope of the mountain Tinden.

Highest point
- Elevation: 1,497 m (4,911 ft)
- Coordinates: 60°50′27″N 8°32′10″E

Geography
- Location: Hemsedal, Buskerud, Norway
- Topo map: 1616 IV Hemsedal

Totten is a mountain located in the Hemsedal municipality in Norway. It is a part of Hemsedal Top 20. Some of the hike to the peak can be done by travelling with one of Hemsedal's many ski lifts.
