= Rauberflaket =

Mountain in Eastern Norway

Highest point
- Elevation: 584 m (1,916 ft)
- Prominence: 104 m (341 ft)
- Isolation: 3 km (1.9 mi)
- Coordinates: 59°24′42″N 9°46′40″E

Geography
- Location: Eastern Norway

Rauberflaket is a mountain in Eastern Norway. The 584-metre (1,916 ft) tall mountain is a tripoint on the borders of Kongsberg Municipality in Buskerud county, Larvik Municipality in Vestfold county, and Siljan Municipality in Telemark county.

== See also ==
- List of mountains of Norway by height
