= Hemsedal =

Hemsedal Municipality Hemsedal kommune
- Municipality
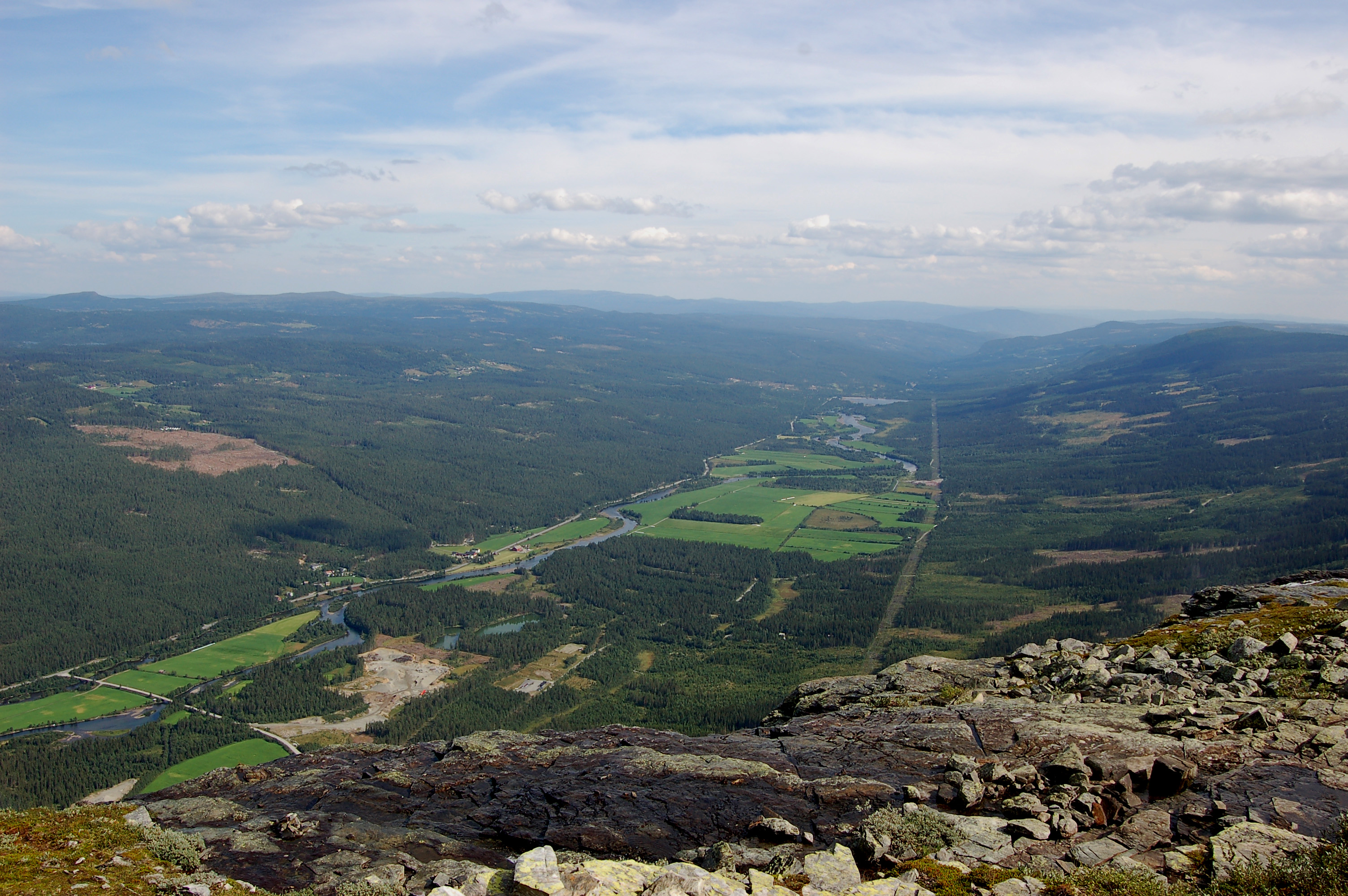

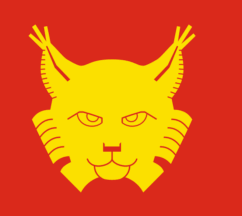
- Flag Coat of arms

- Buskerud within Norway

- Hemsedal within Buskerud
- Coordinates: 60°54′21″N 8°30′53″E
- Country: Norway
- County: Buskerud
- District: Hallingdal
- Administrative centre: Trøym

Government
  - Mayor (2020): Pål Rørby (Sp)

Area
  - Total: 753 km^{2} (291 sq mi)
  - Land: 711 km^{2} (275 sq mi)
  - Rank: #145 in Norway

Population (2004)
  - Total: 1,876
  - Rank: #341 in Norway
  - Density: 3/km^{2} (7.8/sq mi)
  - Change (10 years): ▲ +13.2%
- Demonym: Hemsedøl

Official language
  - Norwegian form: Nynorsk
- Time zone: UTC+01:00 (CET)
  - Summer (DST): UTC+02:00 (CEST)
- ISO 3166 code: NO-3042
- Website: Official website

Hemsedal is a municipality in Buskerud county, Norway. It is part of the traditional region of Hallingdal. The administrative centre of the municipality is the village of Trøym. Hemsedal lies on the Norwegian National Road 52 (Rv 52). Hemsedal Municipality is located 220 km (136.70 mi) northwest of Oslo and 273 km (169.63 mi) from Bergen. In 1897, Hemsedal was separated from Gol Municipality to become a municipality of its own.

== General information ==
=== Name ===
The Old Norse form of the name was Hemsudalr. The second element is dalr, which means "dale" or "valley"; the first element is usually taken as the genitive case of the river name Hemsa (now Hemsil) of unknown derivation, although Sophus Bugge believed that it might derive from the Old Norse hemsa, hefnsa or hofn, meaning "going to pasture". The Norwegian word hems ("bed built in a small loft room") is named after the valley of Hemsedal.

=== Coat of arms ===
The coat of arms is from modern times. The arms were granted on 2 October 1992 and were designed by Stein Davidsen. The arms show a gold lynx head on a red background.

Number of minorities (1st and 2nd generation) in Hemsedal by country of origin in 2017
Ancestry	Number
Poland	130
Sweden	126
Denmark	65

== History ==
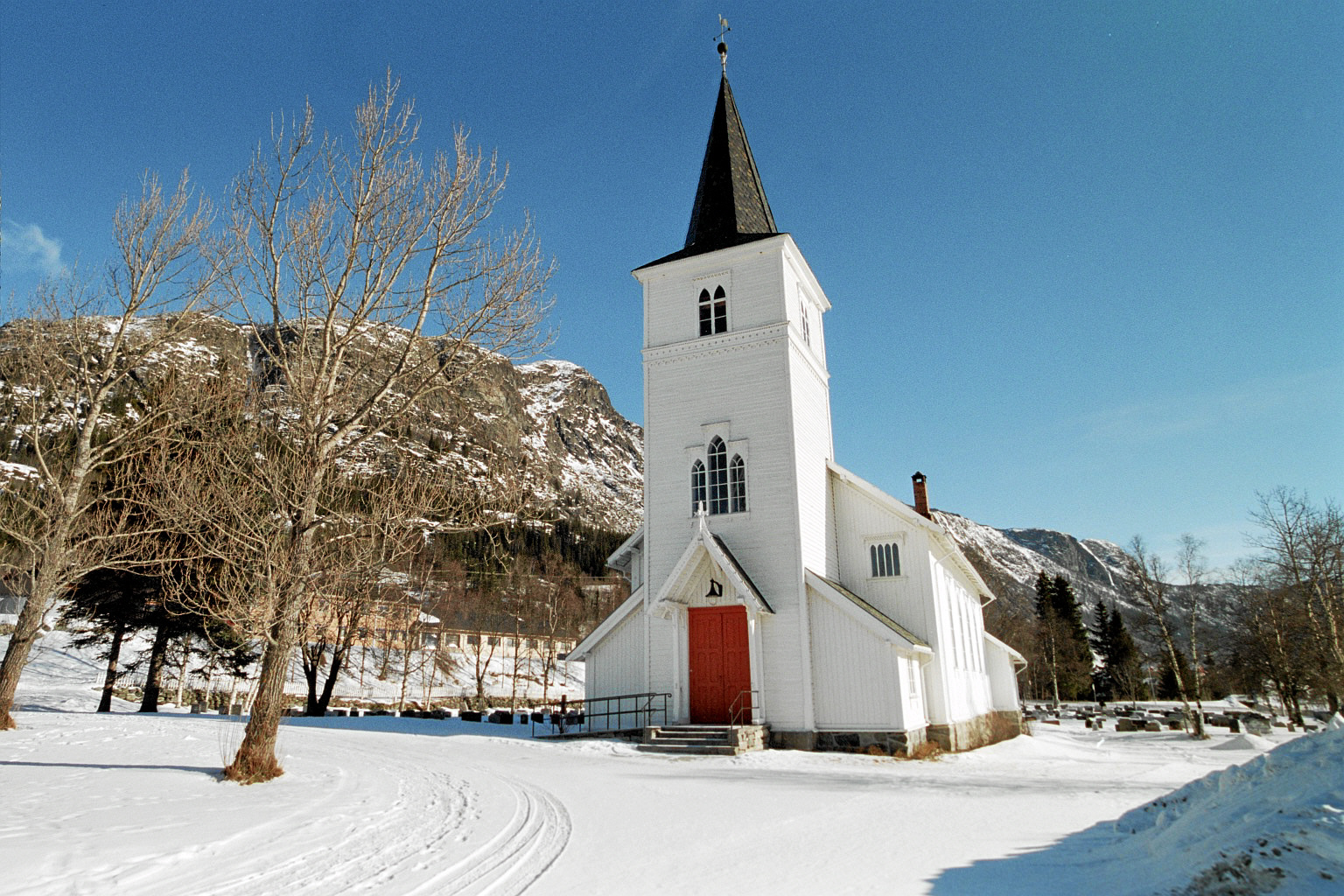
Hemsedal Church

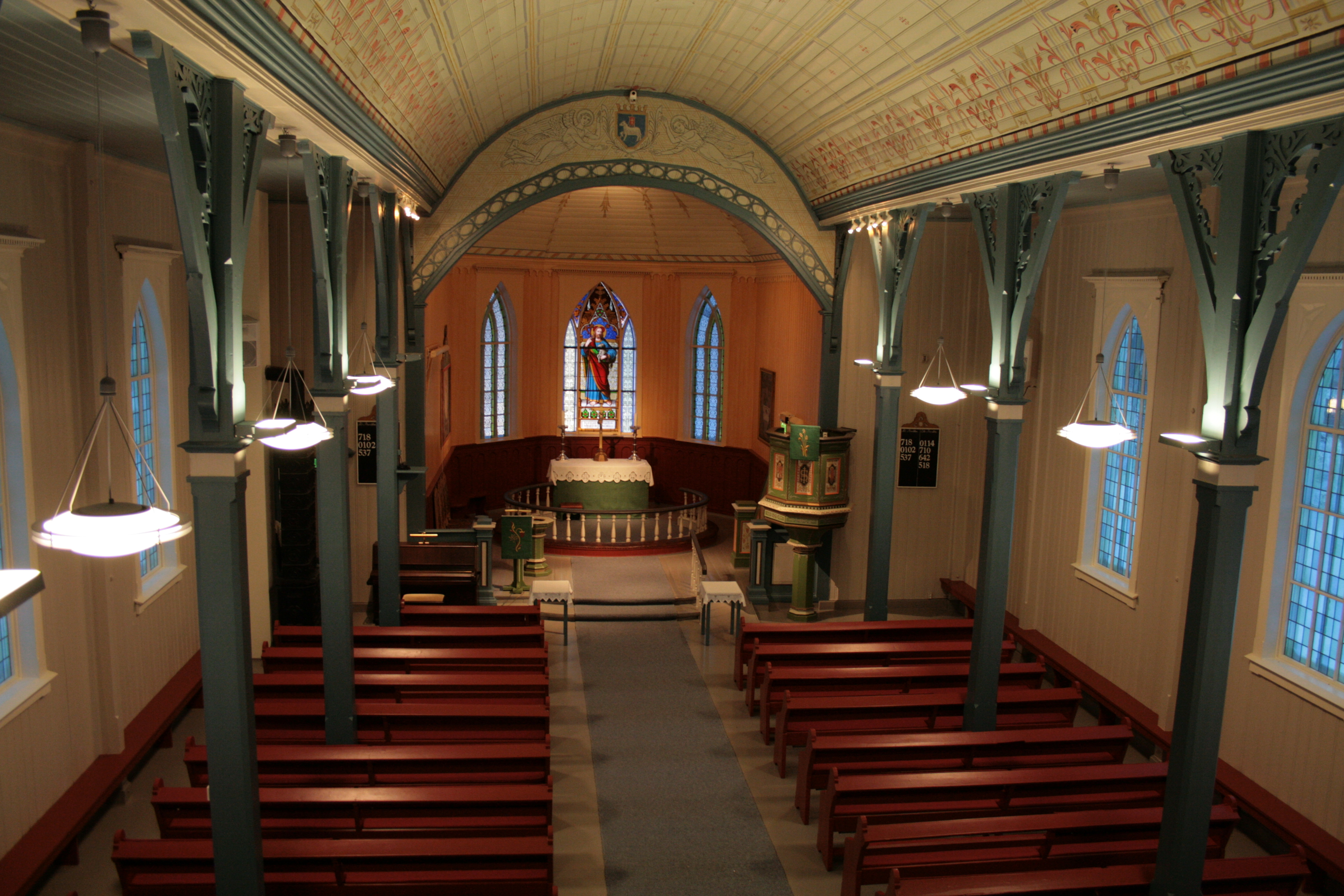
Hemsedal Church sanctuary

=== Early history ===
Hemsedal stave church (Hemsedal stavkyrkje) is believed to have been built between 1207 and 1224, and is first mentioned, as Ecclesia Aamsodal, in the accounts and diaries of the Papal nuncios sent to Scandinavia to collect tithes in 1282–1324. In 1327 it was also mentioned under the name Skodvinar Kirkja i Hemsudali; this refers to alternate names of the farm where it stood, Kyrkjebøen: Skodvin and Skadengård. The church was dismantled in 1882.

Hemsedal Church (Hemsedal kyrkje) was built during 1882 as a replacement for Hemsedal stave church. It was constructed of wood on the basis of plans by architect Johannes Henrik Nissen. It has 500 seats. The organ was built in 1888 by Olsen & Jørgensens orgelfabrikk and was restored in 1976. The church is associated with the Hallingdal deanery of the Diocese of Tunsberg.

Hemsedal's economy has traditionally been based on agriculture. The valley had small and medium-sized farms that were widely scattered on the valley bottom on both sides of the river and along the slopes. Because of the high altitude, farming has concentrated for the most part on livestock and dairy, and use of summer shielings has been important for the farms, which could not find sufficient pasturage in the valley bottom. Most therefore had milking stations on the shielings.

In the 1647 cadastre there was only one farm in Hemsedal large enough to pay full taxes; there were 24 liable for half taxation and 15–16 assessed as disused. In addition, there were a number of enterprises that were not assessed tax. The estimated population was about 400 (the exact number is unknown). Until the mid-19th century, the population increased steadily. In 1845 there were 1,775 people in the village. However, the population declined again over the next 75 years. In 1920 it had fallen to 1,358, before once more starting to increase.

=== Recent history ===
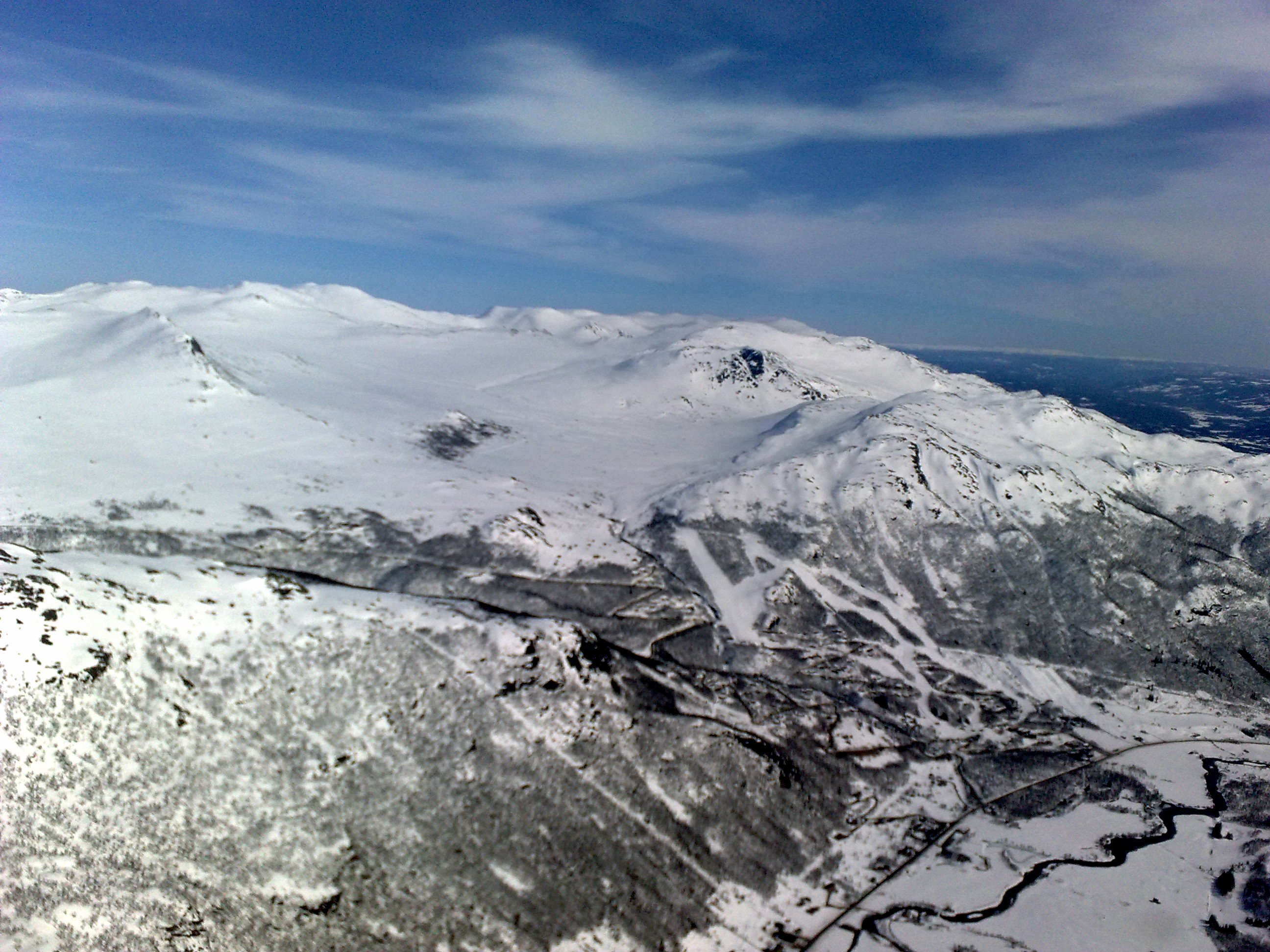
Aerial view of Hemsedal in winter

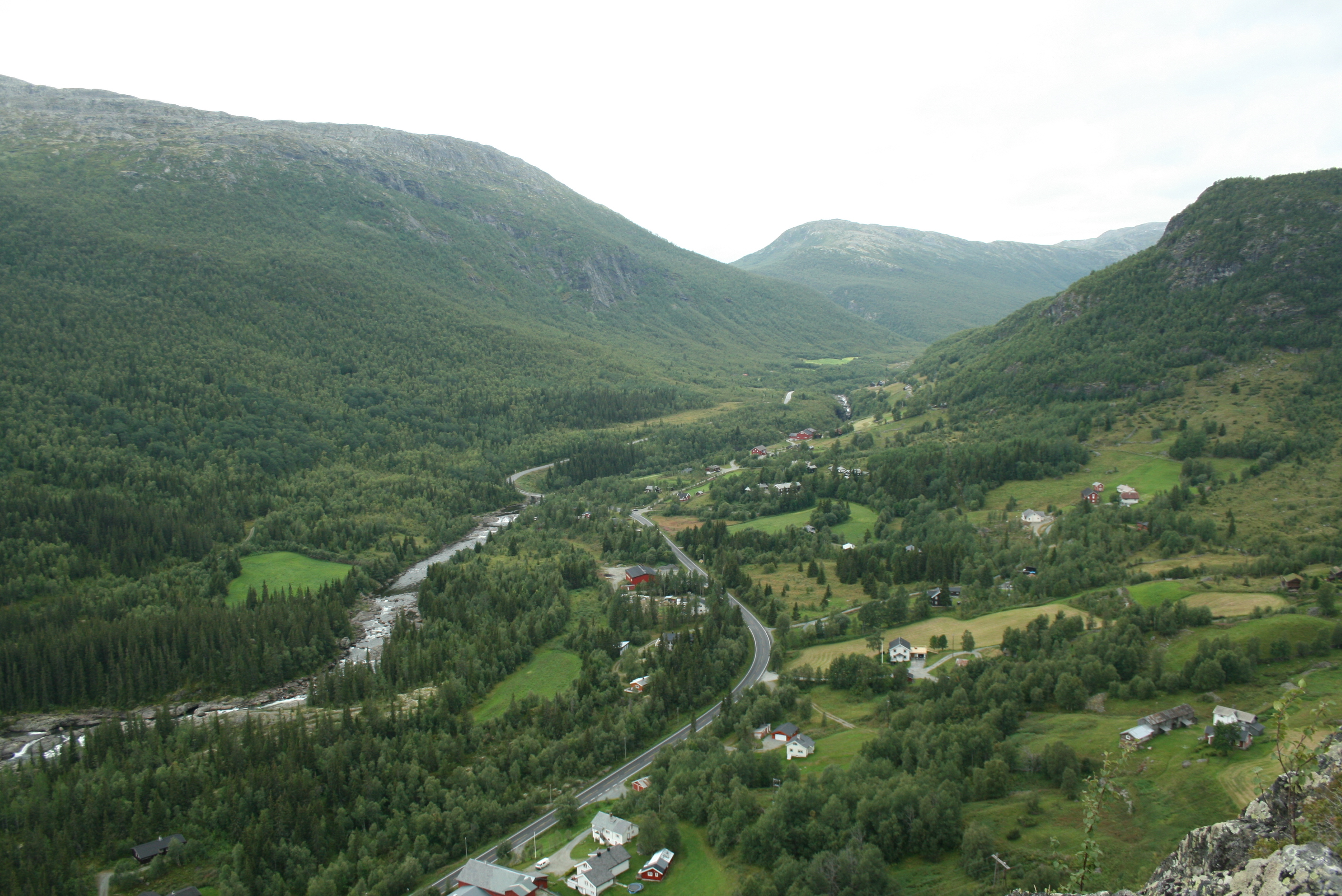
View of Hemsedal in summer from Tuv

Skogstad Hotell was completed in 1905 as the first hotel in the village. Before that, in the latter half of the 19th century, a road had been built through the village with the hope that it would become a major route to Western Norway. However, things changed dramatically with the opening of the Bergen Railway in 1909. Hemsedal once more became a detour, while upper Hallingdal took over as the main route.

After the World War II, new places to stay were established in the valley, such as Vangen Pensjonat (inn) at Tuv (1947) and Lykkjaheim Pensjonat (1953). A tourist agency was established in 1939 and in 1952 suggested building a ski lift in Hemsedal, but this did not happen until 1959, when Fossheim Pensjonat created the Tottenheisen, a 350-metre (1,150 ft) ski lift behind the inn at Ulsåk, serving the first piste in the village, Tottenløypa. However, this lift was torn down in 1961.

Hemsedal Skisenter opened at Holdeskaret in 1961, and a few years later, planning began for tourist development. Over the five years beginning in 1980, a series of new businesses aimed at tourists were established. The first chairlift, Olaheisen, opened in 1983. Tourism has continued to grow in economic significance for Hemsedal. More than half of visitors come from abroad. Hemsedal is now also popular in the summer season, due to opportunities for fishing, hiking, climbing, cycling, golf and other activities.

== Geography ==
The municipality is bordered to the north by Vang Municipality and Vestre Slidre Municipality (both in Innlandet county), to the east by Nord-Aurdal Municipality (in Innlandet county) and Gol Municipality, to the south by Ål Municipality and Hol Municipality, and to the west by Lærdal Municipality (in Vestland county). Lakes in the region include Juklevatnet.

=== Climate ===
Climate data for Hemsedal II 1991–2020 (604 m, average high/low 2006-2025)
Month	Jan	Feb	Mar	Apr	May	Jun	Jul	Aug	Sep	Oct	Nov	Dec	Year
Mean daily maximum °C (°F)	−3.7 (25.3)	−1 (30)	3.3 (37.9)	8 (46)	13.7 (56.7)	18.4 (65.1)	20 (68)	17.8 (64.0)	13.7 (56.7)	6.9 (44.4)	0.8 (33.4)	−2.7 (27.1)	7.9 (46.2)
Daily mean °C (°F)	−7.3 (18.9)	−6.6 (20.1)	−2.8 (27.0)	1.9 (35.4)	6.7 (44.1)	11 (52)	13.4 (56.1)	11.7 (53.1)	7.8 (46.0)	2 (36)	−3.2 (26.2)	−7.1 (19.2)	2.3 (36.2)
Mean daily minimum °C (°F)	−12.5 (9.5)	−11.5 (11.3)	−7.5 (18.5)	−3.2 (26.2)	1.1 (34.0)	5.6 (42.1)	8.1 (46.6)	6.8 (44.2)	3.7 (38.7)	−1 (30)	−6.1 (21.0)	−11.1 (12.0)	−2.3 (27.8)
Source 1: yr.no (mean)
Source 2: seklima (average high/low)

=== Mountains ===
- Hydalsberget
- Langebottfjellet
- Leinenosi

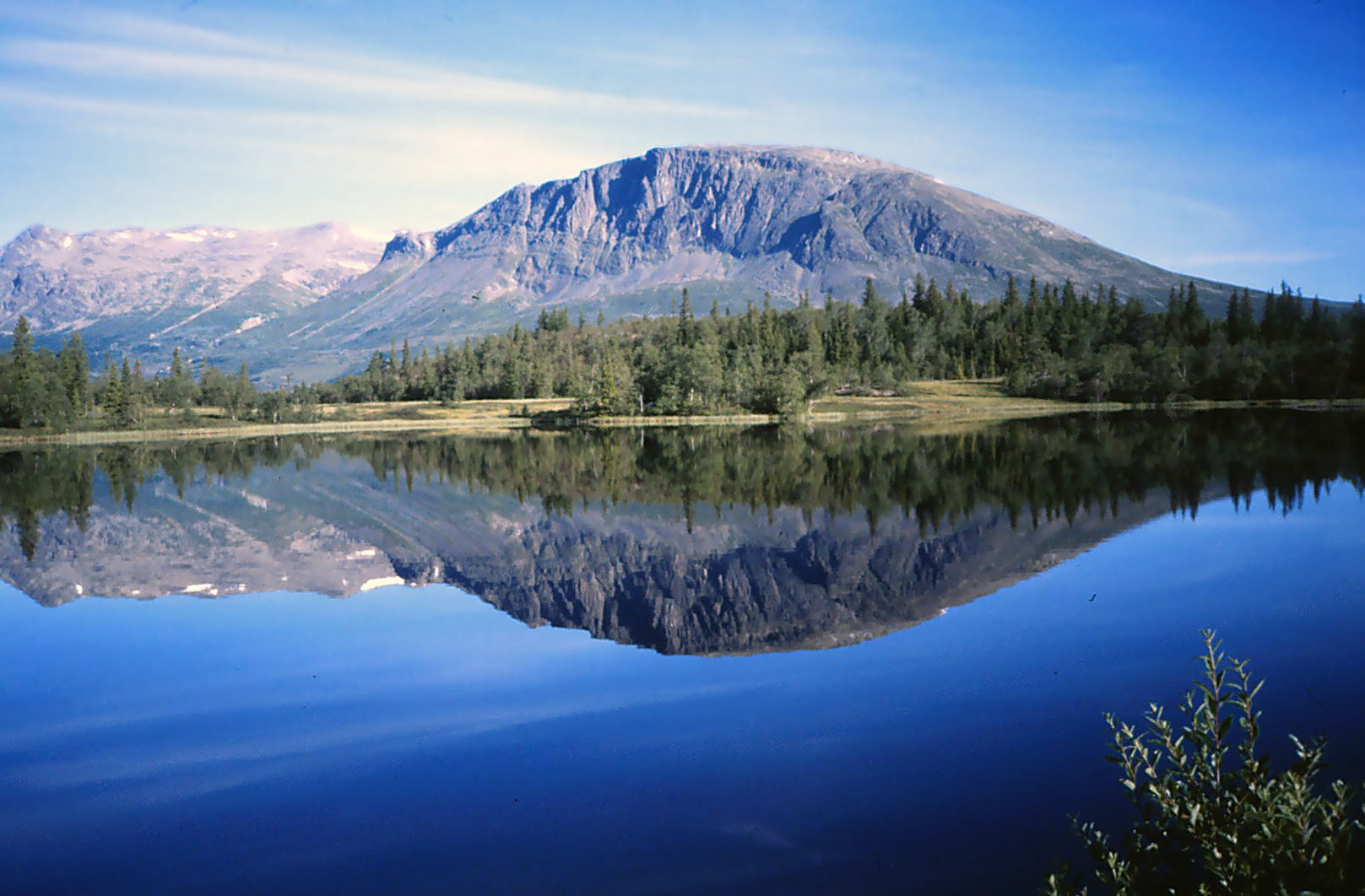
Skogshorn

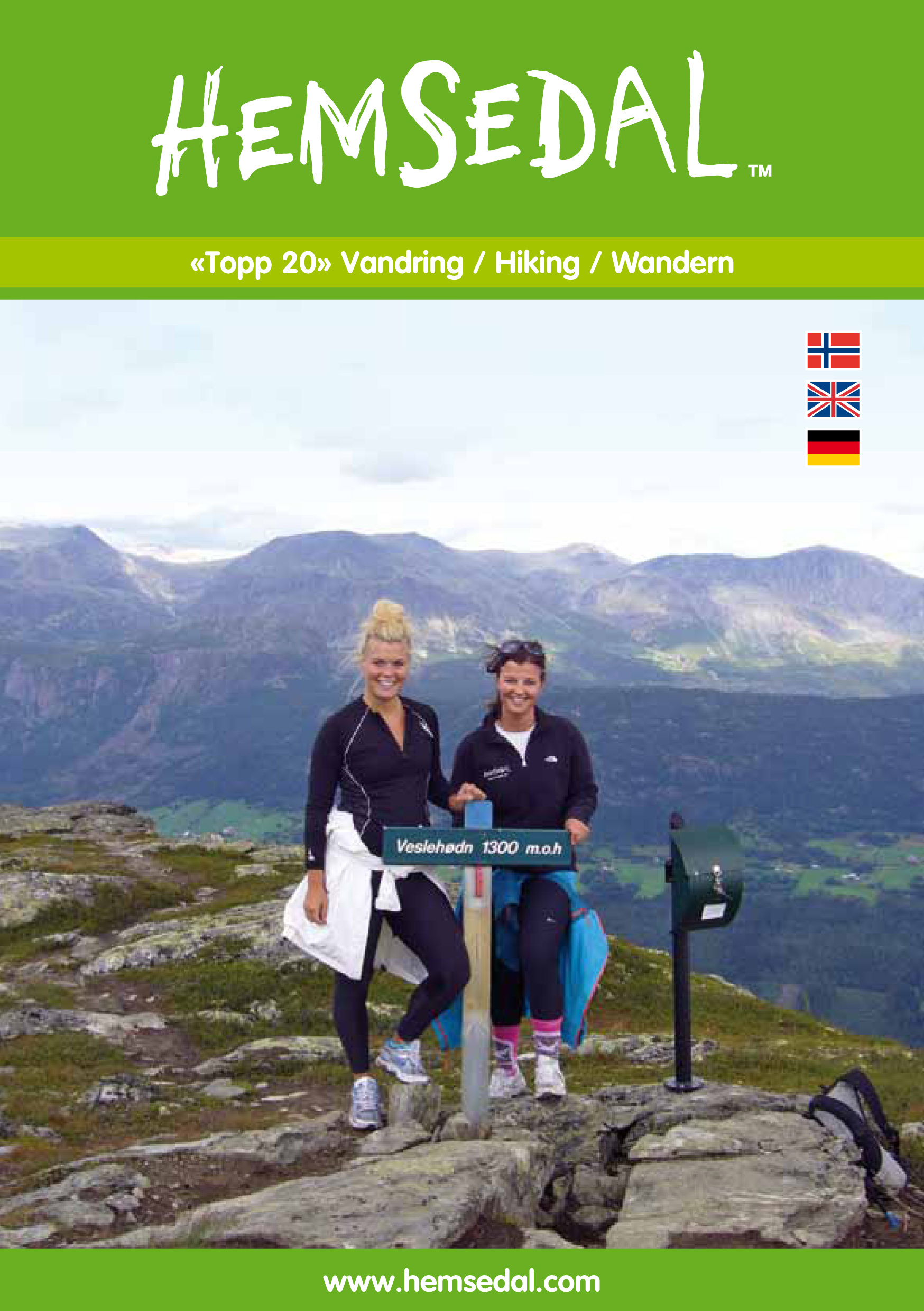
Hemsedal Top 20

=== Tourism ===
One of the first tourists in Hemsedal was the Norwegian polar explorer Fritjof Nansen, who visited in 1898 and stayed at the Bjøberg Fjellstue. Today Hemsedal is a popular destination, with Hemsedal Skisenter the main attraction. About 70% of all visitors come in the winter season (December–May) and most of the remaining 30% in the summer months.

Hemsedal Skisenter is the second largest ski resort in Norway, with 44 km slopes. The ski centres in Hemsedal and Grøndalen were bought in 2000 by the Swedish company Sälenstjärnen, which changed its name the following year to SkiStar. Skistar also owns Trysil Ski Centre, Sälen and Åre, Vemedalen and Hammarbybacken in Sweden.

== Attractions ==
- Hemsedal Bygdetun is located at Øvre Løkji in the village of Ulsåk. Øvre Løkji is a museum farm from which there are several trails up into the mountains. Hemsedal's cross-country stadium is located at Gravset and is the starting point for a large network of trails to Lykkja and Gol, including 10 km (6.21 mi) of lighted trails. The museum has houses and artifacts from the early 18th century.
- Rjukandefossen waterfall is located in the vicinity of the village of Tuv
- Hemsedal Top 20 offers mountain climbing during summer months.

== Notable residents ==
- Josef Monsrud (1922-2009) was a Norwegian forester and resistance member during World War II. At the age of twenty he joined the resistance Osvald Group. He went through some initial training and was hired as a guard for the strictly illegal Communist Party of Norway which had a secret base in Hemsedal.
- Kjell Venås (1927-2018) born in Hemsedal, was a Norwegian philologist. He spent most of his career at the University of Oslo as a lecturer and as a professor (1971 to 1997), specializing in research about the Nynorsk language form.
- Ingrid Wigernæs (1928-2023) was a Norwegian cross-country skier who won a silver medal in the 3×5 km relay at the 1966 World Championships.
- Sigrun Slapgard (born in Hemsedal 1953) is a Norwegian journalist and non-fiction writer.
- Erik Wøllo (born in Hemsedal 1961) is a Norwegian composer and musician, guitarist and synthesist. As a solo recording artist, he is most known for his electronic and ambient musical soundscapes.
- Hege Nerland (1966–2007) was a Norwegian politician for the Socialist Left Party. In 2003 she helped found the local party chapter in her native Hemsedal.
- Geir Skeie (born 1980) is a Norwegian chef and restaurateur, who worked at the Skarsnuten Hotel in Hemsedal.
- Eirik Markegård (born in Hemsedal 1984) is a Norwegian footballer who plays as a striker for the Norwegian fifth Division side Jardar.
- Erik Solbakken (born in Hemsedal 1984) is a Norwegian television presenter. Solbakken was one of the hosts of the Eurovision Song Contest 2010.
- Jesper Taaje (born 1997), footballer who has played over 280 games.

== Sister cities ==
The following cities are twinned with Hemsedal:

- - Essunga, Västra Götaland County, Sweden
- - Kalvola, Southern Finland, Finland
- - Tõrva, Valga County, Estonia

== Gallery ==
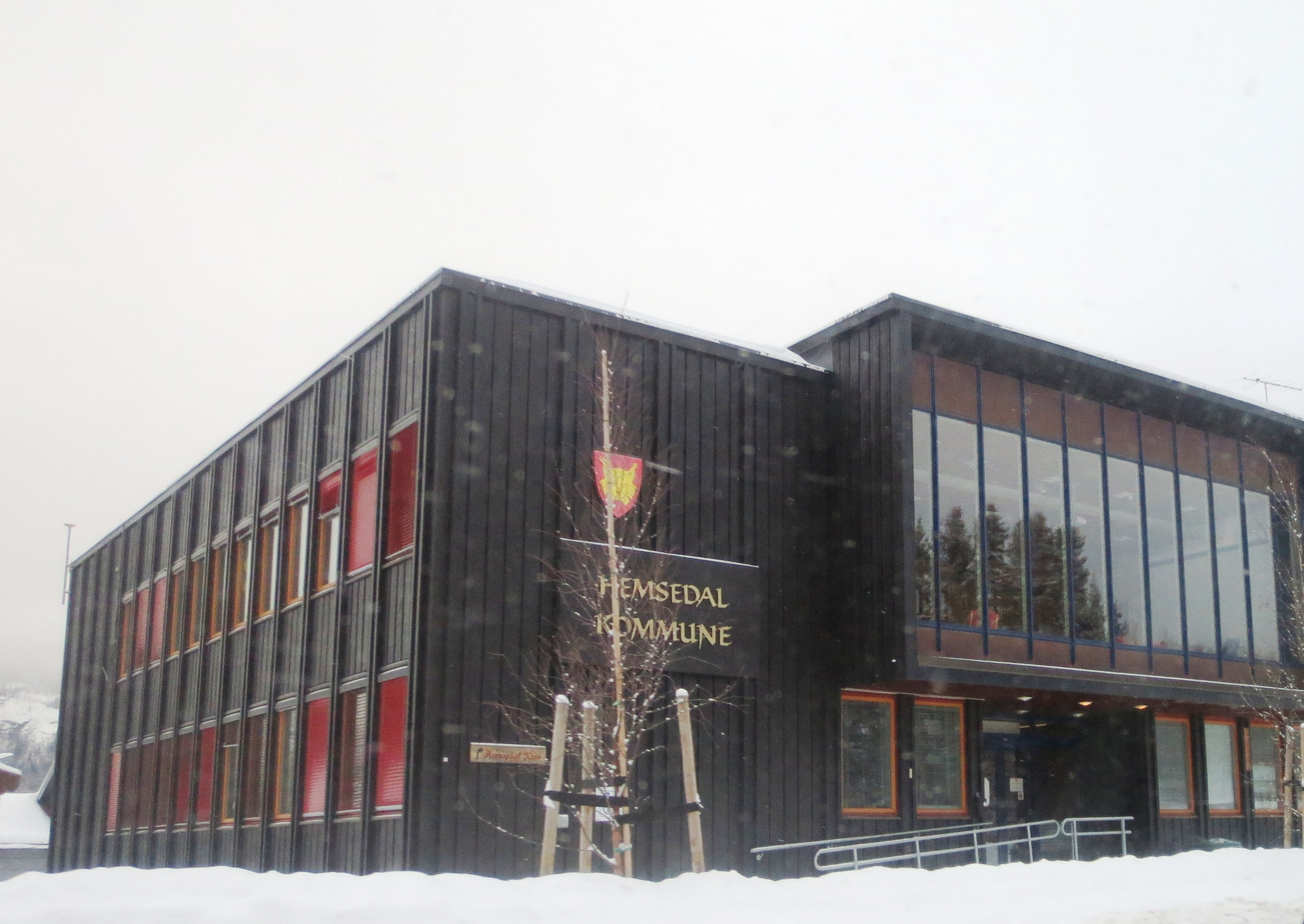
Hemsedal Community Office

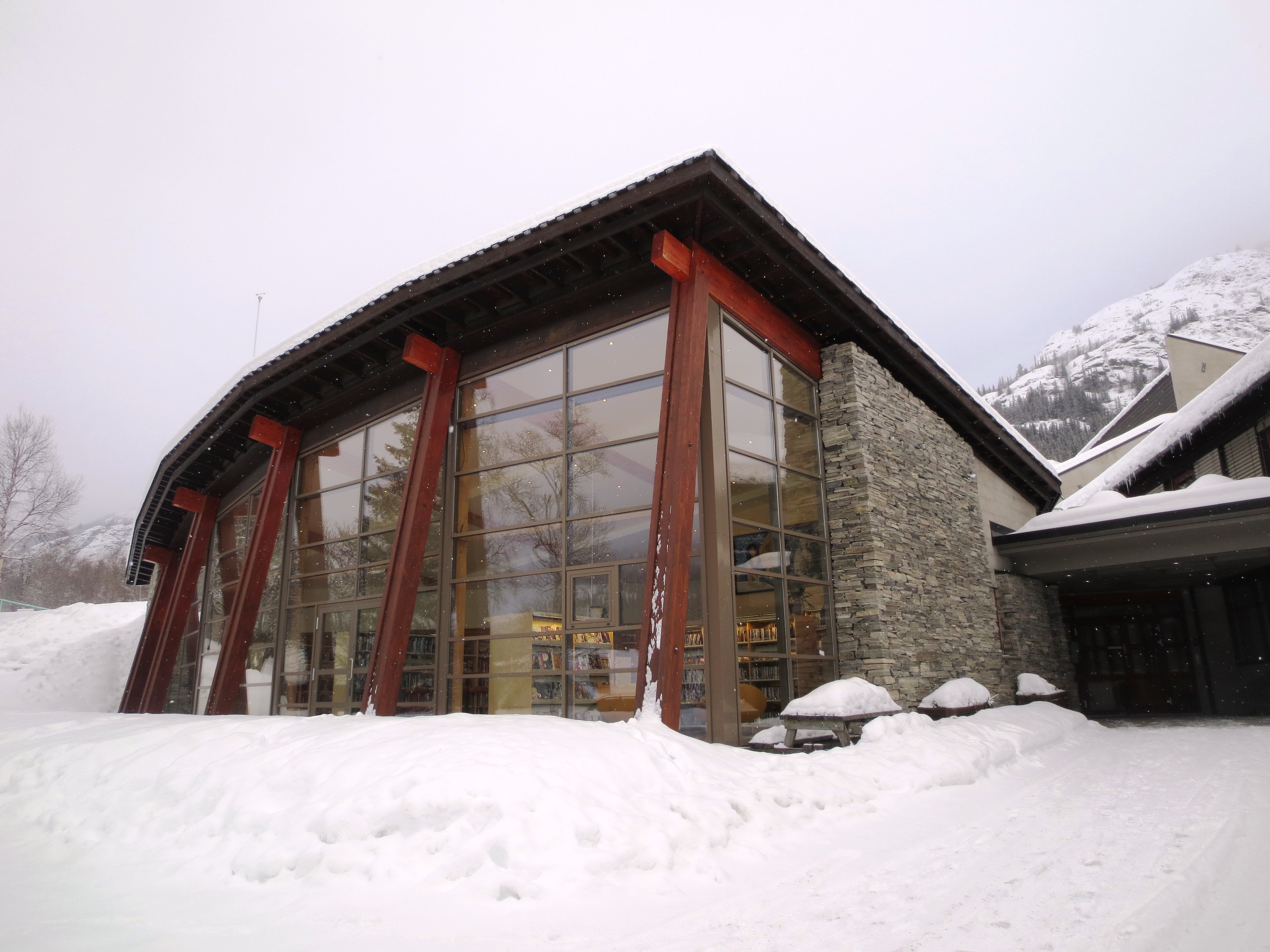
Hemsedal Library

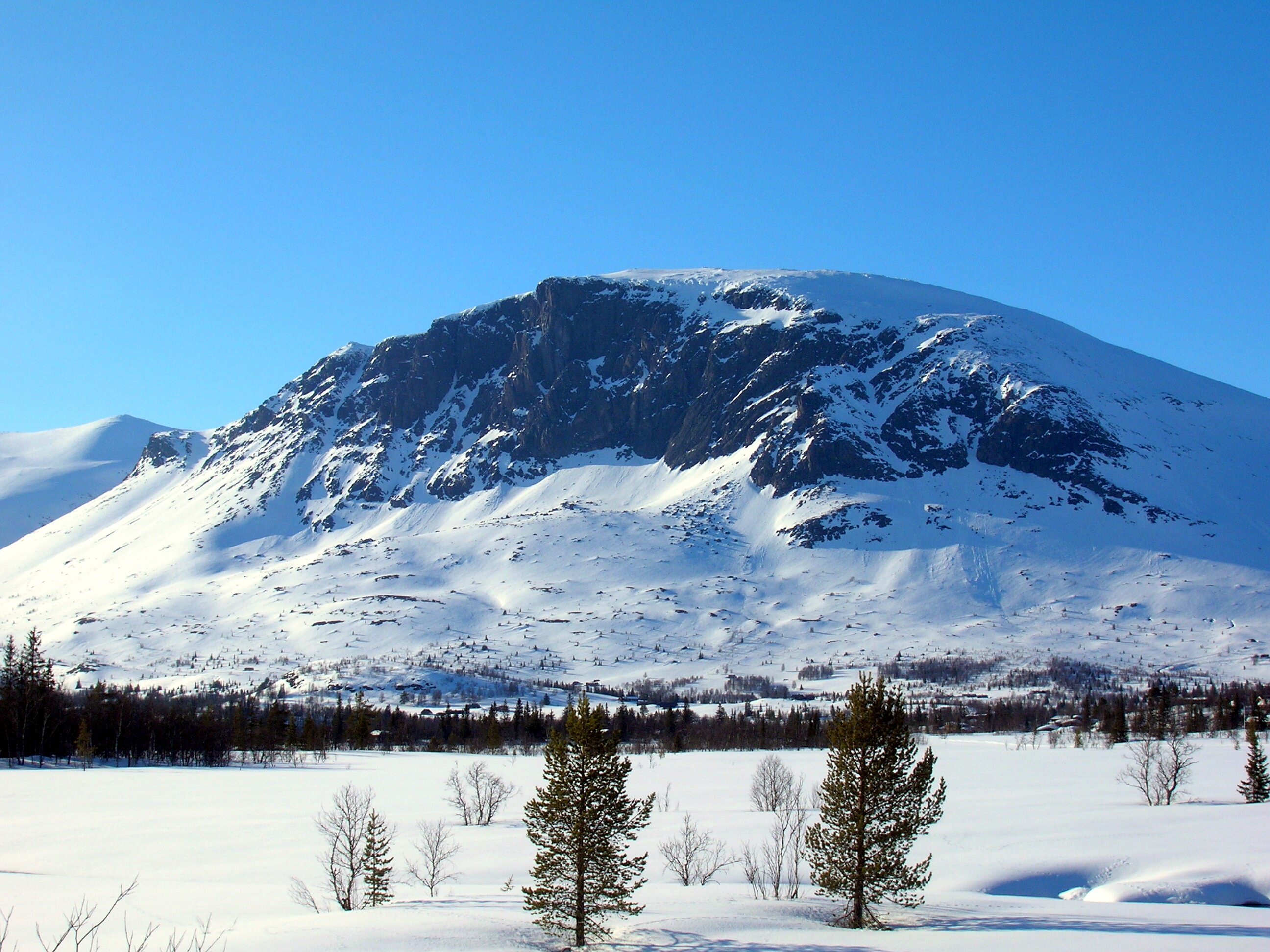
Skogshorn in winter

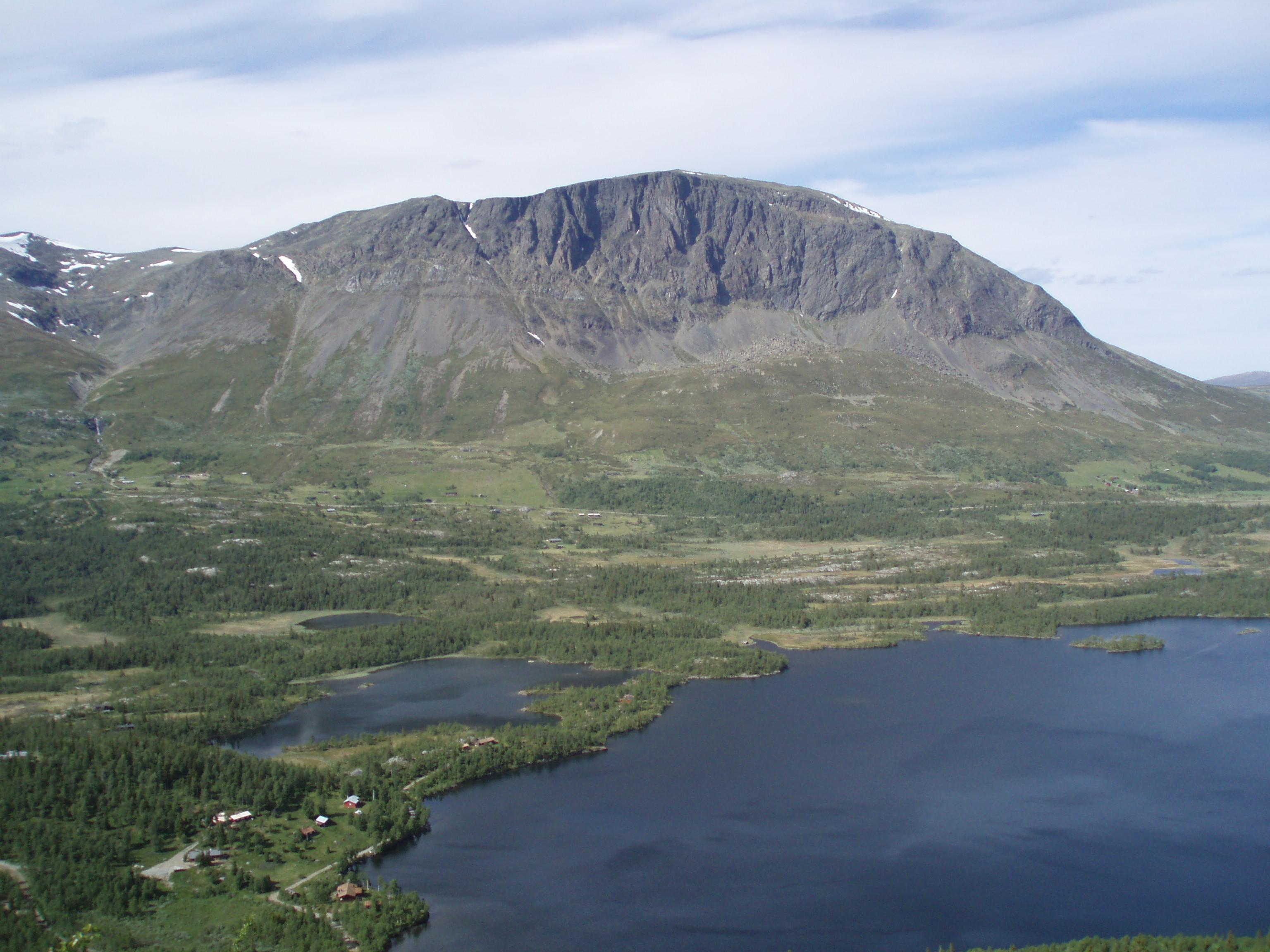
Skogshorn in Summer

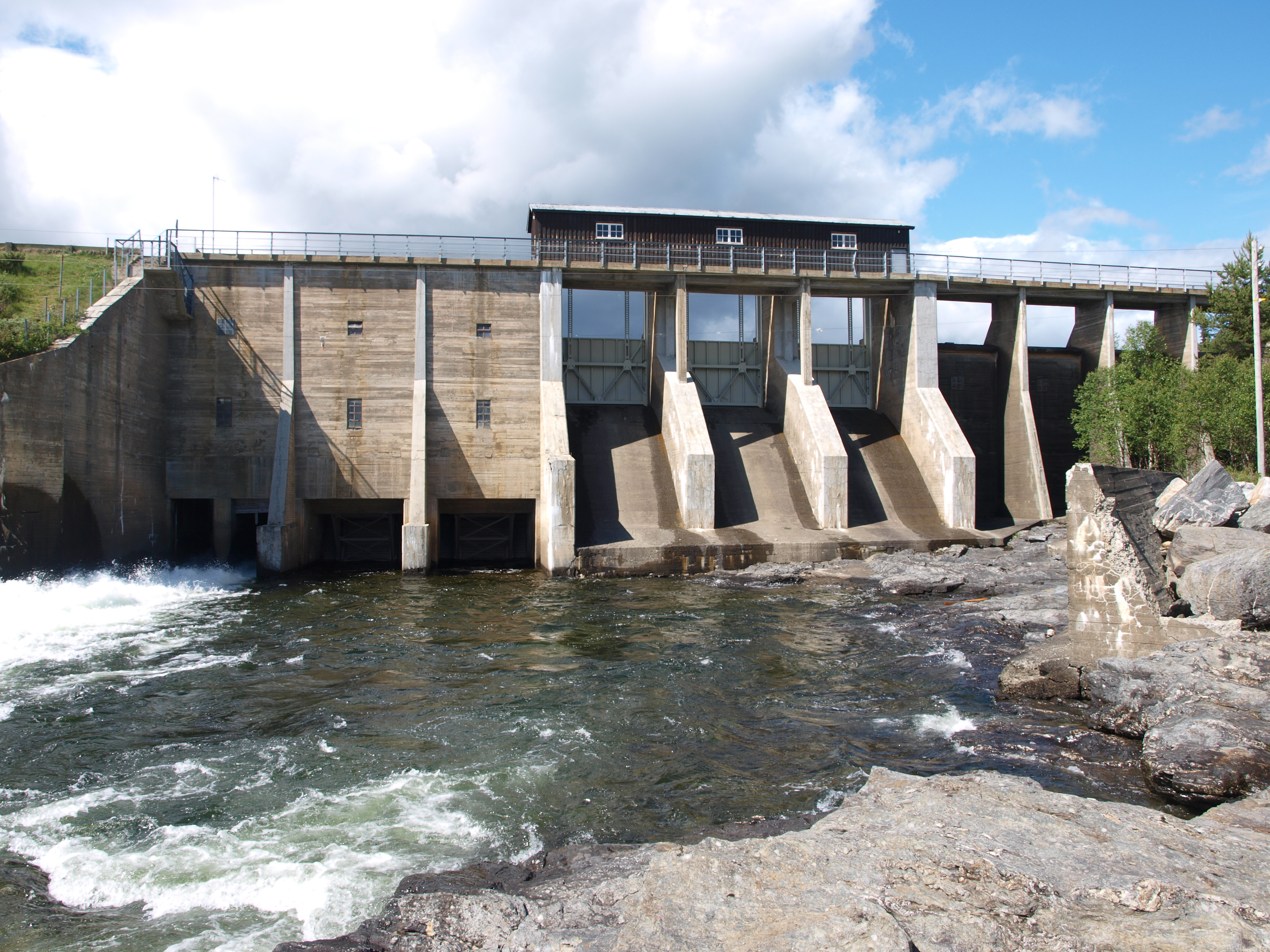
Tisleifjorden Dam

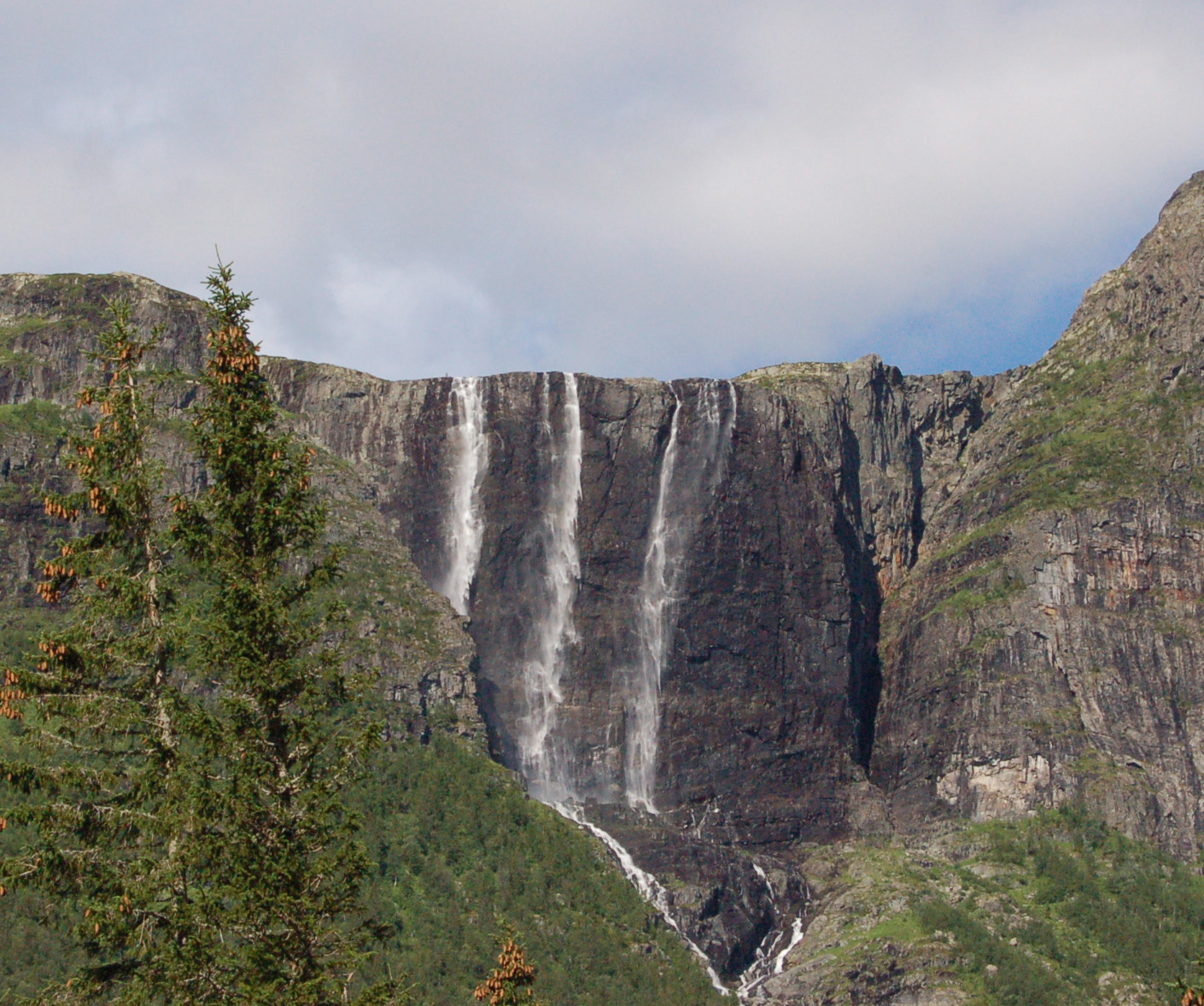
Hydnefossen

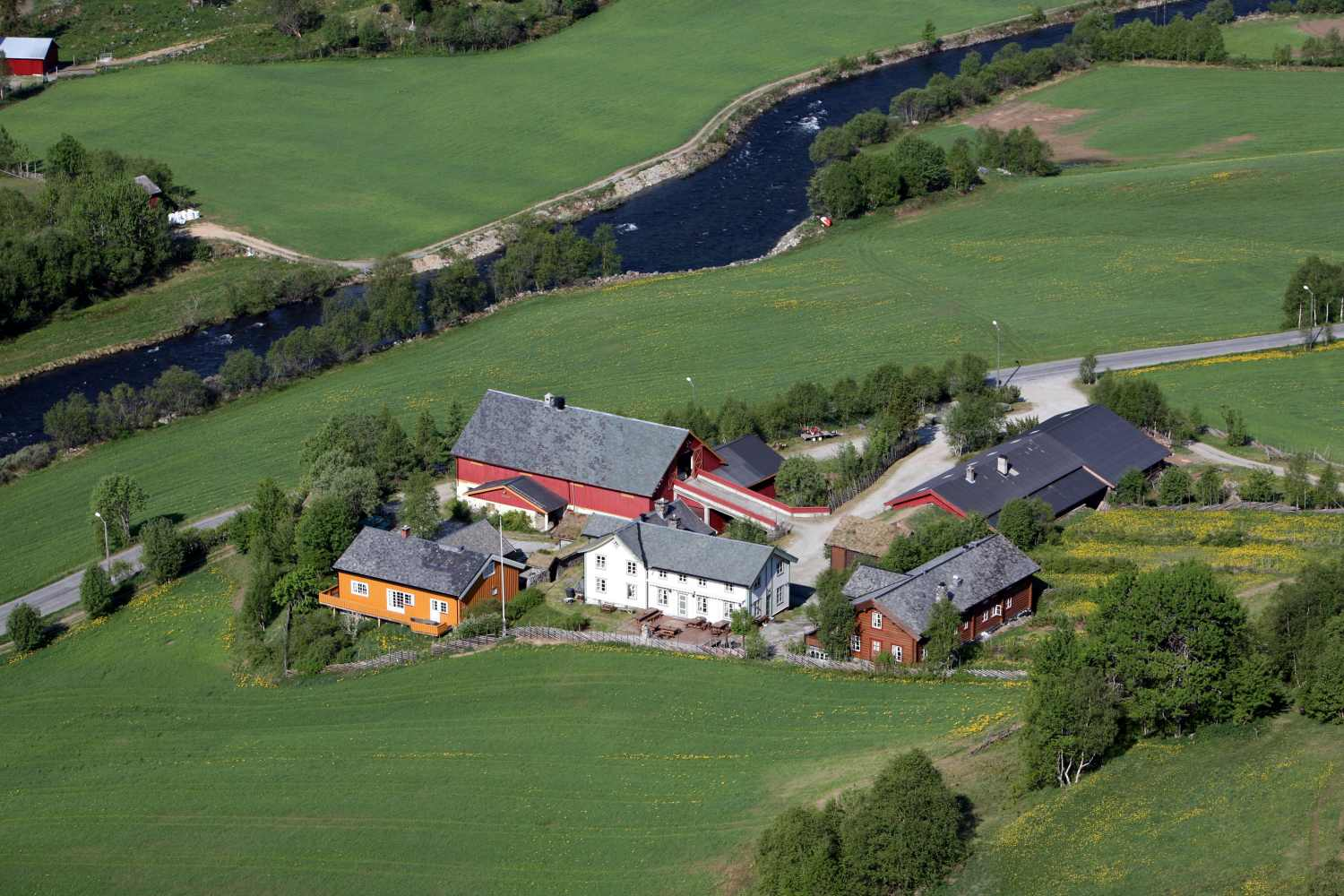
Fausko Skysstasjon

== See also ==
- Bjørnbakknosi
- Hallingmål-Valdris
- Rauberflaket
- Såta
- Svøo
