= Grindane =

Mountain in Innlandet, Norway

- Grinddadn / Grindadn
- Interactive map of the mountain

Highest point
- Elevation: 1,725 m (5,659 ft)
- Prominence: 460 m (1,510 ft)
- Parent peak: Store Jukleggi
- Isolation: 5.5 km (3.4 mi) to Rankonøse
- Coordinates: 61°05′32″N 8°31′01″E

Geography
- Location: Innlandet, Norway
- Parent range: Filefjell

Grindane is a mountain in Vang Municipality in Innlandet county, Norway. The 1,725-metre (5,659 ft) tall mountain is located in the Filefjell mountain area, about 5 kilometres (3.1 mi) southwest of the village of Vang i Valdres. The mountain is surrounded by several other notable mountains including Tverrfjellet, Skoddetinden, and Kljåkinnknippene to the west; Øyre and Ørnenøse to the southwest; Storebottegge, Klanten, and Rankonøse to the south; and Blåkampen to the southeast.

== See also ==
- List of mountains of Norway by height
