= Vesle Jukleeggi =

Mountain in Vestland, Norway

Highest point
- Elevation: 1,703 m (5,587 ft)
- Prominence: 416 m (1,365 ft)
- Parent peak: Høgeloft
- Isolation: 3.9 km (2.4 mi)
- Coordinates: 61°01′00″N 8°15′50″E

Geography
- Location: Vestland/Buskerud, Norway
- Parent range: Filefjell
- Topo map: 1517 II Øye

Vesle Jukleeggi is a mountain in southern Norway. It is located on the border of Lærdal Municipality in Vestland county and Hemsedal Municipality in Buskerud county. The 1,703-metre (5,587 ft) tall mountain is located about 24 kilometres (15 mi) east of the village of Borgund, about 25 kilometres (16 mi) northwest of the village of Hemsedal, and about 21 kilometres (13 mi) southwest of the village of Vang i Valdres. The mountain is surrounded by several other notable mountains including Høgeloft and Haukefjellet to the northwest. The lake Juklevatnet lies right between Haukefjellet and Vesle Jukleeggi.

== See also ==
- List of mountains of Norway by height
