= Haukefjellet =

Mountain in Vestland/Buskerud, Norway

Highest point
- Elevation: 1,804 m (5,919 ft)
- Prominence: 94 m (308 ft)
- Parent peak: Høgeloft
- Isolation: 1.4 km (0.87 mi)
- Coordinates: 61°02′58″N 8°14′24″E

Geography
- Location: Vestland and Buskerud, Norway
- Parent range: Filefjell
- Topo map: 1517 II Øye

Haukefjellet is a mountain in southern Norway. It is located on the border of Lærdal Municipality in Vestland county and Hemsedal Municipality in Buskerud county. The 1,804-metre (5,919 ft) tall mountain is located about 23 kilometres (14 mi) east of the village of Borgund, about 26 kilometres (16 mi) northwest of the village of Hemsedal, and about 20 kilometres (12 mi) southwest of the village of Vang i Valdres. The mountain is surrounded by several other notable mountains including Høgeloft to the northwest and Vesle Jukleeggi to the south. The lake Juklevatnet lies right between Haukefjellet and Vesle Jukleeggi.

== See also ==
- List of mountains of Norway by height
