= Ørnenøse =

Mountain in Innlandet, Norway

- Ørnenosi (unofficial)
- Interactive map of the mountain

Highest point
- Elevation: 1,683 m (5,522 ft)
- Prominence: 223 m (732 ft)
- Parent peak: Suletinden
- Isolation: 2.8 km (1.7 mi) to Storebottegge
- Coordinates: 61°04′02″N 8°23′08″E

Geography
- Location: Innlandet, Norway
- Parent range: Filefjell

Ørnenøse is a mountain in Vang Municipality in Innlandet county, Norway. The 1,683-metre (5,522 ft) tall mountain is located in the Filefjell mountain area, about 13 kilometres (8.1 mi) southwest of the village of Vang i Valdres. The mountain is surrounded by several other notable mountains including Tverrfjellet to the north, Kljåkinnknippene and Skoddetinden to the northwest, Høgeloft to the west, Storebottegge and Rankonøse to the southeast, and Øyre to the northeast.

== See also ==
- List of mountains of Norway by height
