= Kljåkinnknippene =

Mountain in Innlandet, Norway

- Interactive map of the mountain

Highest point
- Elevation: 1,662 m (5,453 ft)
- Prominence: 123 m (404 ft)
- Parent peak: Grensehøgdi
- Isolation: 1.2 km (0.75 mi)
- Coordinates: 61°05′19″N 8°19′58″E

Geography
- Location: Innlandet, Norway
- Parent range: Filefjell

Kljåkinnknippene is a mountain in Vang Municipality in Innlandet county, Norway. The 1,662-metre (5,453 ft) tall mountain is located in the Filefjell mountain area, about 13 kilometres (8.1 mi) southwest of the village of Vang i Valdres. The mountain is surrounded by several other notable mountains including Tverrfjellet to the north, Skoddetinden and Suletinden to the northwest, Høgeloft to the southwest, and Ørnenøse and Øyre to the southeast.

== See also ==
- List of mountains of Norway by height
