= Øyre =

Mountain in Innlandet, Norway

- Interactive map of the mountain

Highest point
- Elevation: 1,671 m (5,482 ft)
- Prominence: 122 m (400 ft)
- Parent peak: Ørnenøse
- Isolation: 1.9 km (1.2 mi)
- Coordinates: 61°04′40″N 8°24′53″E

Geography
- Location: Innlandet, Norway
- Parent range: Filefjell

Øyre is a mountain in Vang Municipality in Innlandet county, Norway. The 1,671-metre (5,482 ft) tall mountain is located in the Filefjell mountain area, about 10 kilometres (6.2 mi) southwest of the village of Vang i Valdres. The mountain is surrounded by several other notable mountains including Tverrfjellet, Skoddetinden, and Kljåkinnknippene to the northwest; Ørnenøse to the southwest; Storebottegge to the south; Rankonøse and Ranastongi to the southeast; and Grindane to the east.

== See also ==
- List of mountains of Norway by height
