= Rankonøse =

Mountain in Innlandet, Norway

- Rankonosi (unofficial)
- Interactive map of the mountain

Highest point
- Elevation: 1,769 m (5,804 ft)
- Prominence: 129 m (423 ft)
- Parent peak: Ranastongi
- Isolation: 2.8 km (1.7 mi)
- Coordinates: 61°02′35″N 8°30′43″E

Geography
- Location: Innlandet, Norway
- Parent range: Filefjell

Rankonøse is a mountain in Vang Municipality in Innlandet county, Norway. The 1,769-metre (5,804 ft) tall mountain is located in the Filefjell mountain area, about 10 kilometres (6.2 mi) south of the village of Vang i Valdres. The mountain is surrounded by several other notable mountains including Grindane to the north, Klanten to the east, Blåkampen to the southeast, Ranastongi to the south, Storebottegge to the southwest, and Ørnenøse and Øyre to the northwest.

== See also ==
- List of mountains of Norway by height
