= Storebottegge =

Mountain in Innlandet, Norway

- Storebotteggi (unofficial)
- Interactive map of the mountain

Highest point
- Elevation: 1,826 m (5,991 ft)
- Prominence: 138 m (453 ft)
- Parent peak: Ranastongi
- Isolation: 4.1 km (2.5 mi)
- Coordinates: 61°01′35″N 8°26′16″E

Geography
- Location: Innlandet and Buskerud, Norway
- Parent range: Filefjell

Storebottegge is a mountain on the border of Vang Municipality in Innlandet county and Hemsedal Municipality in Buskerud county, Norway. The 1,826-metre (5,991 ft) tall mountain is located in the Filefjell mountain area, about 13 kilometres (8.1 mi) southeast of the village of Vang i Valdres. The mountain is surrounded by several other notable mountains including Ørnenøse and Øyre to the northwest; Grindane, Rankonøse, and Klanten to the northeast; and Ranastongi and Blåkampen to the southeast.

== See also ==
- List of mountains of Norway by height
