= Tverrfjellet (Vang) =

Mountain in Innlandet, Norway

- Interactive map of the mountain

Highest point
- Elevation: 1,658 m (5,440 ft)
- Prominence: 120 m (390 ft)
- Coordinates: 61°06′12″N 8°21′28″E

Geography
- Location: Innlandet, Norway
- Parent range: Filefjell

Tverrfjellet is a mountain in Vang Municipality in Innlandet county, Norway. The 1,658-metre (5,440 ft) tall mountain is located in the Filefjell mountain area, about 11 kilometres (6.8 mi) southwest of the village of Vang i Valdres. The mountain is surrounded by several other notable mountains including Suletinden and Sulefjellet to the northwest, Skoddetinden to the west, Kljåkinnknippene and Ørnenøse to the south, and Øyre and Grindane to the southeast.

== See also ==
- List of mountains of Norway by height
