= Vennisfjellet =

Mountain in Innlandet, Norway

- Interactive map of the mountain

Highest point
- Elevation: 1,776 m (5,827 ft)
- Prominence: 651 m (2,136 ft)
- Isolation: 18.5 km (11.5 mi) to Ranastongi
- Coordinates: 61°11′58″N 8°34′46″E

Geography
- Location: Innlandet, Norway
- Parent range: Filefjell

Vennisfjellet is a mountain in Vang Municipality in Innlandet county, Norway. The 1,776-metre (5,827 ft) tall mountain is located in the Filefjell mountain area, about 7 kilometres (4.3 mi) north of the village of Vang i Valdres. The mountain is surrounded by several other notable mountains including Mjellknapp to the northeast, and the mountains Trollfonnegge and Skræmetindane to the north.

== See also ==
- List of mountains of Norway by height
