= Skræmetindane =

Mountain in Innlandet, Norway

- Skræmetindene (unofficial)
- Interactive map of the mountain

Highest point
- Elevation: 1,684 m (5,525 ft)
- Prominence: 67 m (220 ft)
- Parent peak: Mugnetinden
- Isolation: 2.2 km (1.4 mi)
- Coordinates: 61°14′31″N 8°37′33″E

Geography
- Location: Innlandet, Norway
- Parent range: Filefjell

Skræmetindane is a mountain in Vang Municipality in Innlandet county, Norway. The 1,684-metre (5,525 ft) tall mountain is located in the Filefjell mountain area, about 13 kilometres (8.1 mi) northeast of the village of Vang i Valdres. The mountain is surrounded by several other notable mountains including Vennisfjellet to the southwest, Mjellknapp to the south, and Trollfonnegge to the northwest.

== See also ==
- List of mountains of Norway by height
