= Trollfonnegge =

Mountain in Innlandet, Norway

- Trollfonneggi
- Interactive map of the mountain

Highest point
- Elevation: 1,662 m (5,453 ft)
- Prominence: 45 m (148 ft)
- Parent peak: Skræmetindane
- Isolation: 1.8 km (1.1 mi)
- Coordinates: 61°15′22″N 8°36′19″E

Geography
- Location: Innlandet, Norway
- Parent range: Filefjell

Trollfonnegge is a mountain in Vang Municipality in Innlandet county, Norway. The 1,662-metre (5,453 ft) tall mountain is located in the Filefjell mountain area, about 15 kilometres (9.3 mi) north of the village of Vang i Valdres. The mountain is surrounded by several other notable mountains including Vennisfjellet and Mjellknapp to the south and Skræmetindane to the southeast.

== See also ==
- List of mountains of Norway by height
