= Mjellknapp =

Mountain in Innlandet, Norway

- Mjelknapp
- Interactive map of the mountain

Highest point
- Elevation: 1,671 m (5,482 ft)
- Prominence: 51 m (167 ft)
- Parent peak: Vennisfjellet
- Isolation: 1.4 km (0.87 mi)
- Coordinates: 61°11′51″N 8°36′57″E

Geography
- Location: Innlandet, Norway
- Parent range: Filefjell

Mjellknapp is a mountain in Vang Municipality in Innlandet county, Norway. The 1,671-metre (5,482 ft) tall mountain is located in the Filefjell mountain area, about 8 kilometres (5.0 mi) northeast of the village of Vang i Valdres. The mountain is surrounded by several other notable mountains including Vennisfjellet to the southwest, and the mountains Trollfonnegge and Skræmetindane to the north.

== See also ==
- List of mountains of Norway by height
