= Sulefjellet =

Mountain in Innlandet, Norway

- Interactive map of the mountain

Highest point
- Elevation: 1,812 m (5,945 ft)
- Prominence: 390 m (1,280 ft)
- Isolation: 5.26 km (3.27 mi) to Bleia
- Coordinates: 61°06′33″N 8°09′18″E

Geography
- Location: Innlandet and Vestland, Norway
- Parent range: Filefjell

Sulefjellet is a mountain in Norway. The mountain sits along the border of Vang Municipality in Innlandet county and Lærdal Municipality in Vestland county. The 1,812-metre (5,945 ft) tall mountain is located in the Filefjell mountain area, about 25 kilometres (16 mi) west of the village of Vang i Valdres. The mountain is surrounded by several other notable mountains including Suletinden to the northwest, Skoddetinden and Tverrfjellet to the east, and Høgeloft to the south.

== See also ==
- List of mountains of Norway by height
