= Skoddetinden =

Mountain in Innlandet, Norway

- Interactive map of the mountain

Highest point
- Elevation: 1,678 m (5,505 ft)
- Prominence: 179 m (587 ft)
- Parent peak: Grensehøgdi
- Isolation: 0.8 km (0.50 mi)
- Coordinates: 61°05′30″N 8°18′32″E

Geography
- Location: Innlandet and Buskerud, Norway
- Parent range: Filefjell

Skoddetinden is a mountain in Vang Municipality in Innlandet county, Norway. The 1,678-metre (5,505 ft) tall mountain is located in the Filefjell mountain area, about 14 kilometres (8.7 mi) southwest of the village of Vang i Valdres. The mountain has three main peaks. The tallest peak lies on the east side of the mountain and the southern peak marks the border between Vang Municipality and neighboring Hemsedal Municipality in Buskerud county. This peak is the northernmost point in Buskerud county. The mountain is surrounded by several other notable mountains including Suletinden and Sulefjellet to the northwest; Høgeloft to the southwest; Øyre, Kljåkinnknippene, and Ørnenøse to the southeast; and Tverrfjellet to the northeast.

== See also ==
- List of mountains of Norway by height
