= Øye Stave Church =

Church in Innlandet, Norway

- Øye stavkirke
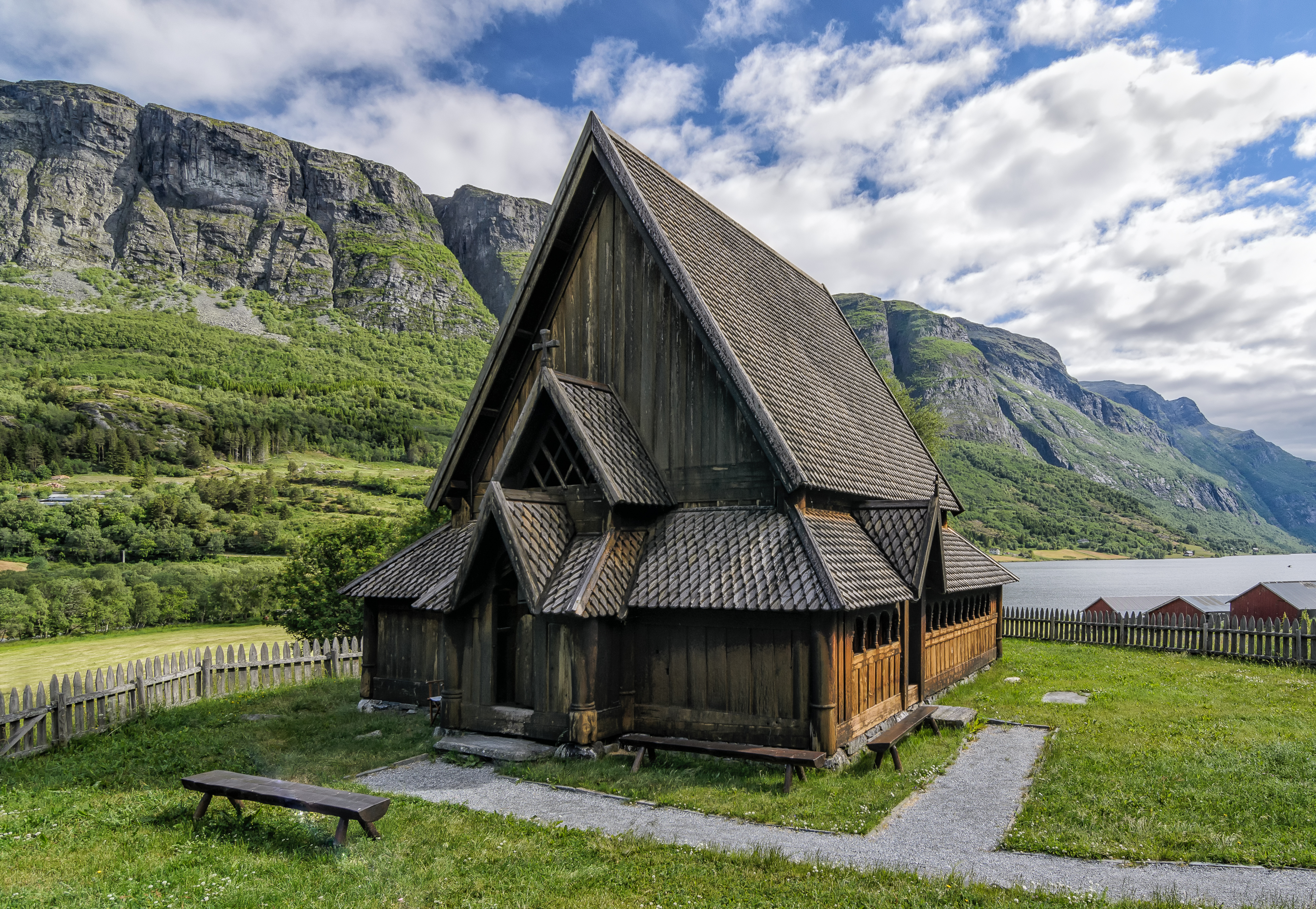
- View of the church
- Øye Stave Church
- 61°10′05″N 8°24′00″E
- Location: Vang Municipality, Innlandet
- Country: Norway
- Denomination: Church of Norway
- Previous denomination: Catholic Church
- Churchmanship: Evangelical Lutheran

History
- Status: Parish church
- Founded: c. 1180
- Consecrated: 1 August 1965

Architecture
- Functional status: Active
- Architect: Ole Øvergaard
- Architectural type: Long church
- Style: Stave church
- Completed: 1965 (61 years ago)
- Closed: 1747-1965

Specifications
- Capacity: 30
- Materials: Wood

Administration
- Diocese: Hamar bispedømme
- Deanery: Valdres prosti
- Parish: Øye
- Norwegian Cultural Heritage Site
- Type: Church
- Status: Automatically protected
- ID: 85935

Øye Stave Church (Norwegian: Øye stavkyrkje) is a parish church of the Church of Norway in Vang Municipality in Innlandet county, Norway. It is located in the village of Øye. It is one of the churches for the Øye parish which is part of the Valdres prosti (deanery) in the Diocese of Hamar. The brown, wooden stave church was built in a long church design in 1965 using plans drawn up by the architect Ole Øvergaard using pieces salvaged from the old 12th century church that had originally been torn down in 1747. The church seats about 30 people.

== History ==
The earliest existing historical records of the church date back to the year 1347, but the church was not new that year. The first church in Øye was a wooden stave church that was built in the late 12th century, likely around the years 1180–1200. This church was located on the flat land along the shore of the lake Vangsmjøse, about 400 metres (1,300 ft) northwest of the present Øye Church. This location was problematic over the years. The land was somewhat boggy and the nearby river Rødøla would flood almost every spring and this led to grave sites being disturbed (legend says the coffins would sometimes float to the surface during the flooding). By the 1660s, the church was said to be in poor condition. In 1747, the old church was torn down and a new Øye Church was built about 400 metres (1,300 ft) to the southeast of the old site.

In 1935, the new Øye Church was being renovated and part of the foundation wall was removed. Under the floor, workers found 156 pieces of the old stave church that had been salvaged after the demolition of the old stave church in 1747. The pieces included some of the staves, foundation pillars, framing, and decorative pieces. No one knew they were there and no one knew why they were saved there. After this discovery, the materials were saved and plans were made to reconstruct the old stave church. The architect Ole Øvergaard designed a reconstruction proposal for the church in 1950. The plans called for using many of the parts discovered in 1935 as well as some parts from the Heddal Stave Church as well as some new materials. The parish decided to build the reconstruction about 100 metres (330 ft) north of the present Øye Church (since the old church site was still not suited for building). The construction was completed and the church was consecrated on 1 August 1965 by the Bishop Alexander Lange Johnson. Historic artifacts include a medieval doorbell, a crucifix from the 13th century with a figure of Christ and a wooden baptismal font from the 1300s.

== Media gallery ==
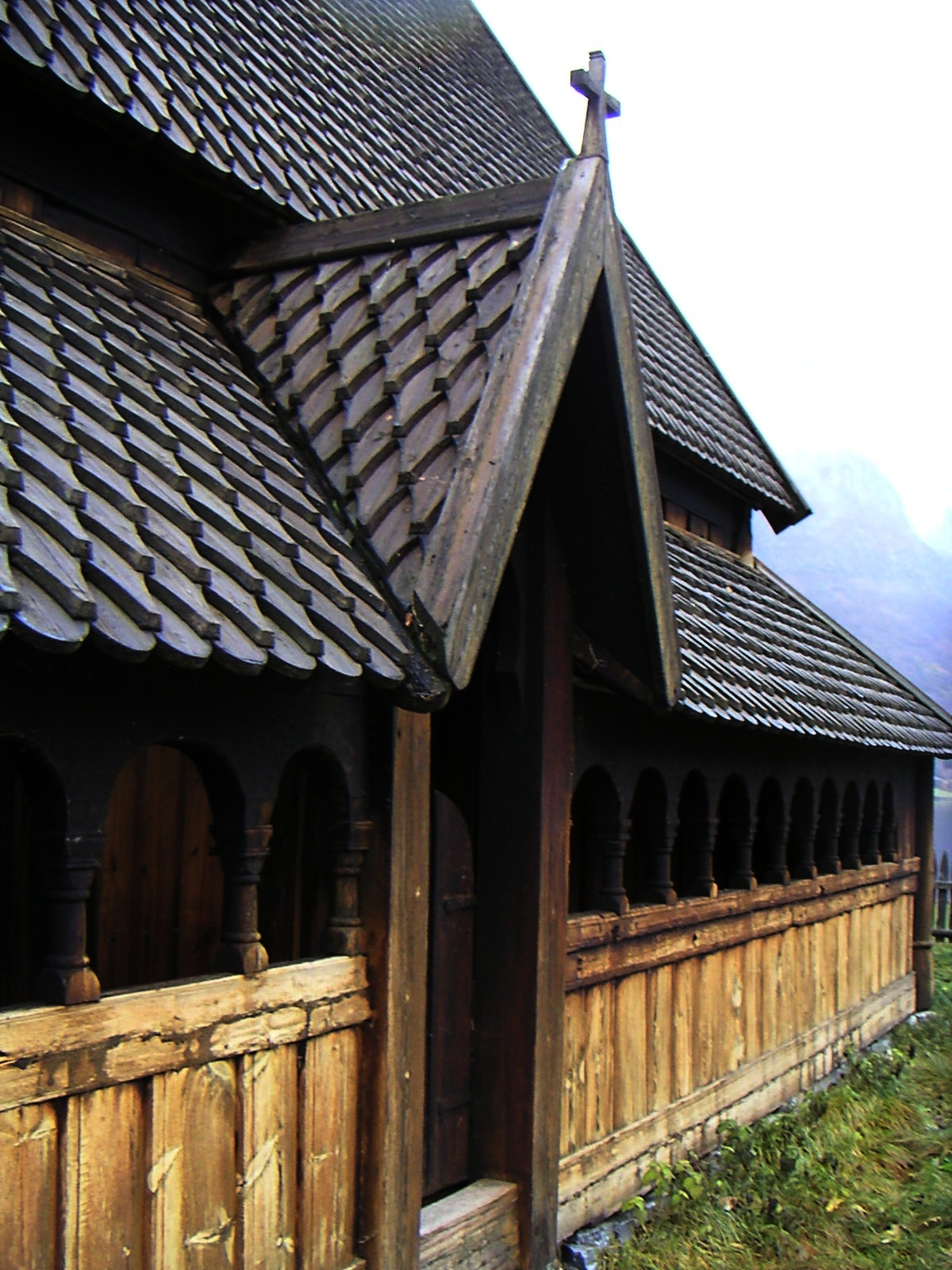

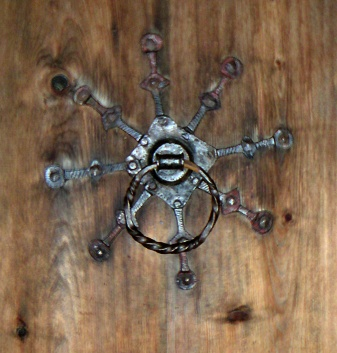

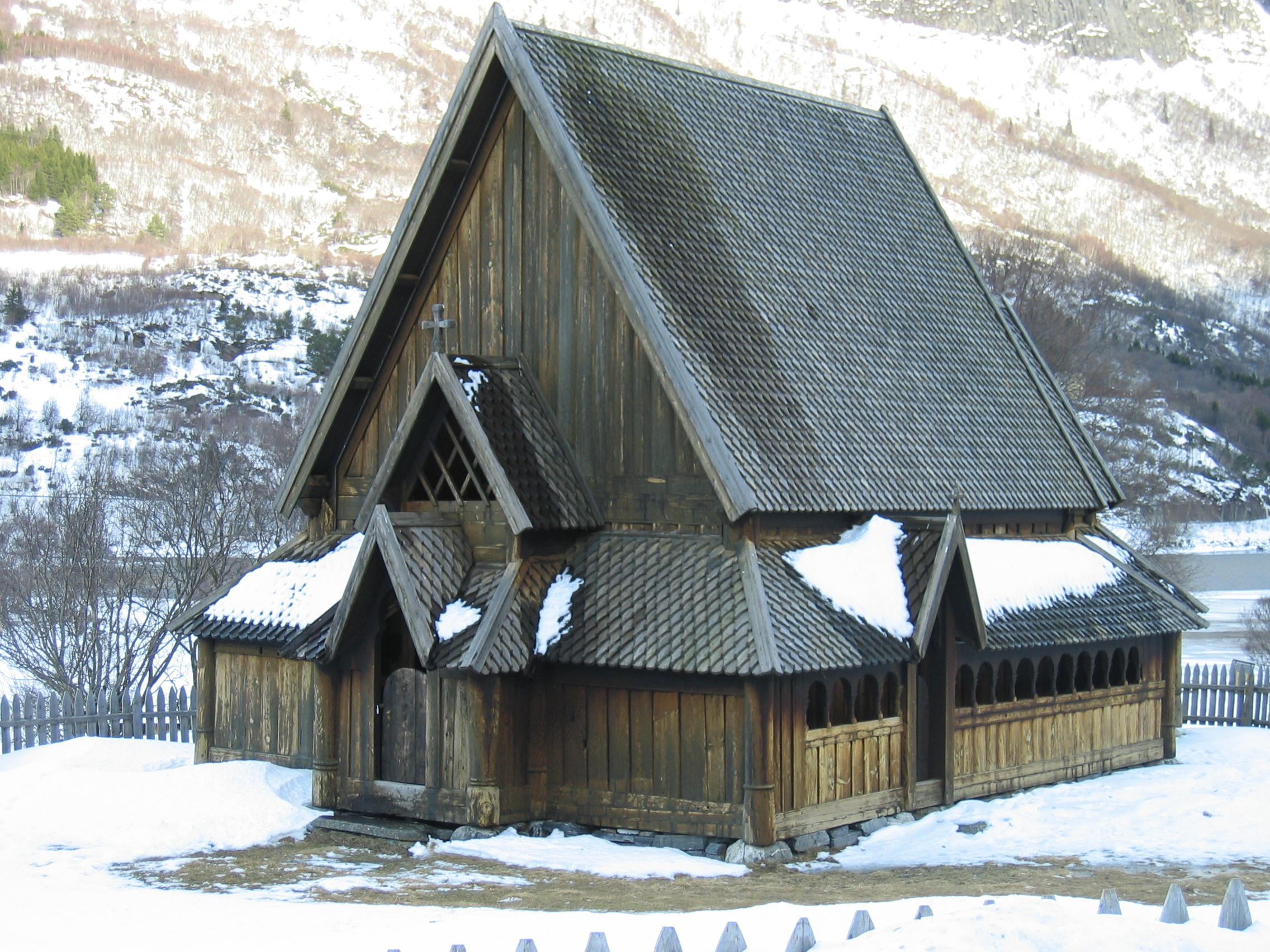

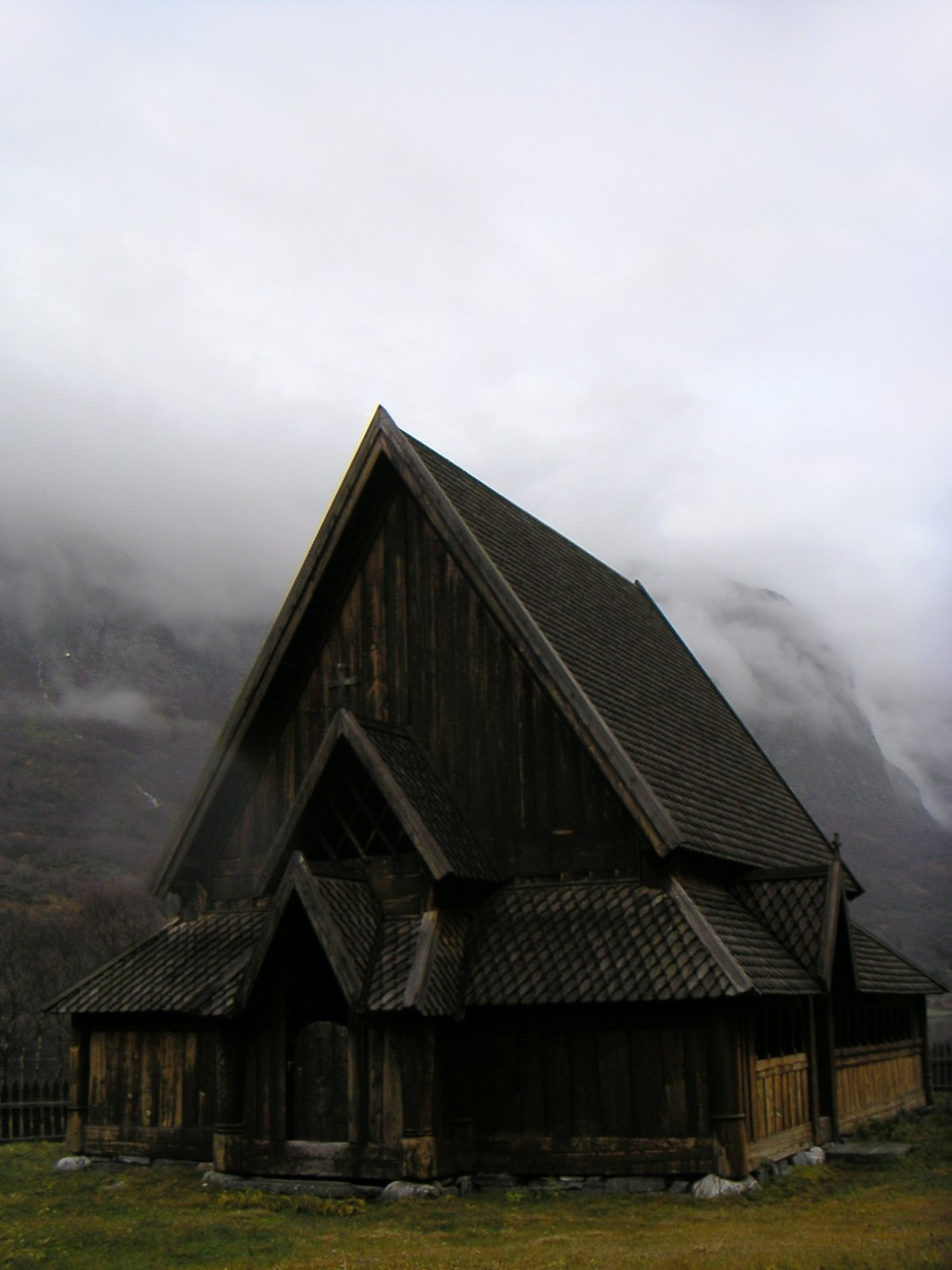

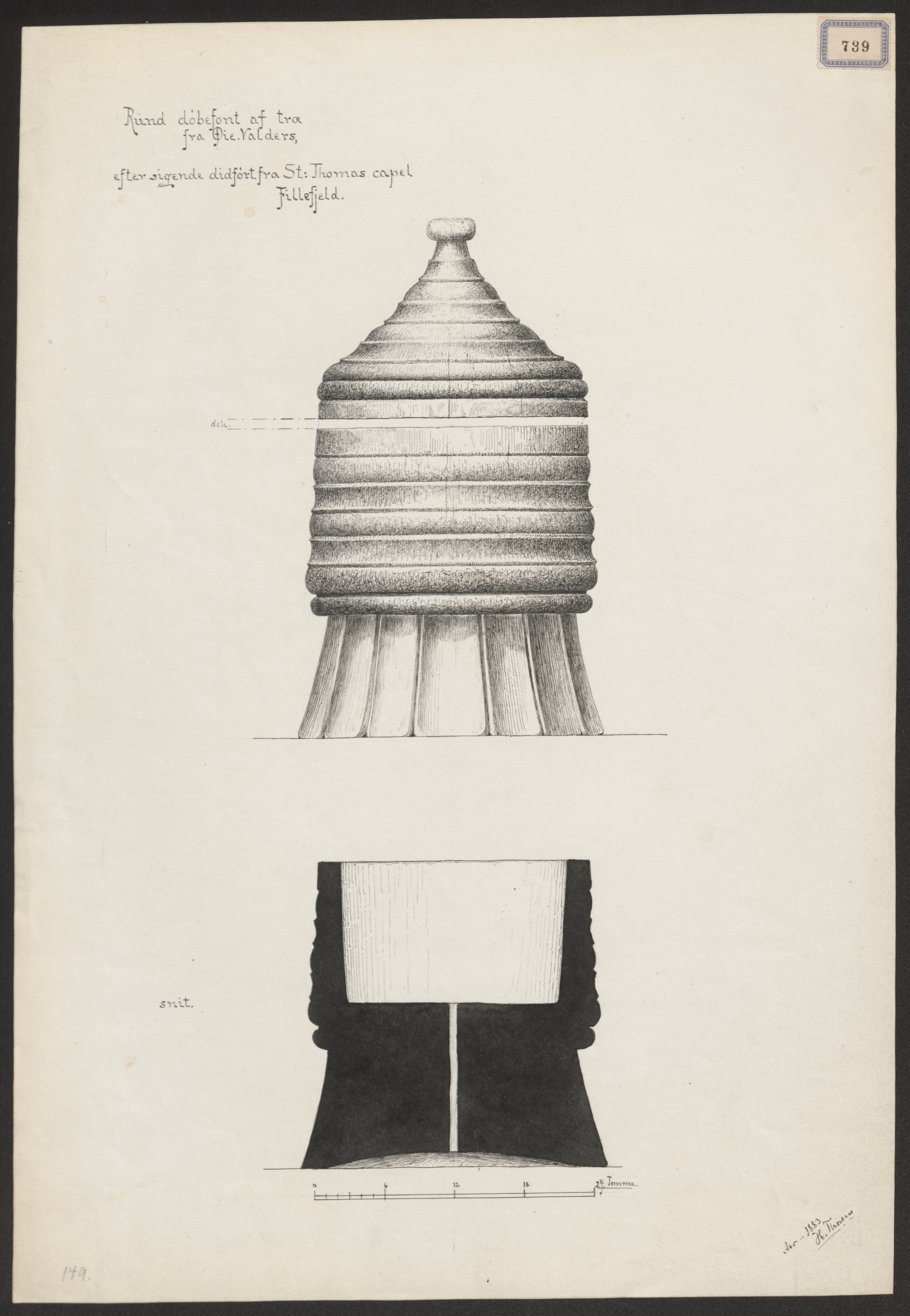
Round wooden baptismal font

== See also ==
- List of churches in Hamar

== Related reading ==
- Anker, Leif (2005). The Norwegian Stave Churches. Oslo: Arfo Forlag. ISBN 978-8291399294.
