= Klanten =

Mountain in Innlandet, Norway

- Interactive map of the mountain

Highest point
- Elevation: 1,763 m (5,784 ft)
- Prominence: 45 m (148 ft)
- Parent peak: Rankonøse
- Isolation: 1.7 km (1.1 mi)
- Coordinates: 61°02′20″N 8°32′30″E

Geography
- Location: Innlandet, Norway
- Parent range: Filefjell

Klanten is a mountain in Vang Municipality in Innlandet county, Norway. The 1,763-metre (5,784 ft) tall mountain is located in the Filefjell mountain area, about 10 kilometres (6.2 mi) south of the village of Vang i Valdres. The mountain is surrounded by several other notable mountains including Grindane to the north, Rankonøse to the west, Storebottegge to the southwest, and Blåkampen to the southeast.

== See also ==
- List of mountains of Norway by height
