= Øljusjøane =

Lake in Hemsedal and Lærdal, Norway

- Øljusjøen; Ørjusjøen
- Interactive map of Øljusjøane
- Location: Buskerud/Vestland border
- Coordinates: 60°56′40″N 08°06′36″E
- Basin countries: Norway
- Surface area: 8.45 km^{2} (3.26 sq mi)
- Shore length^{1}: 20 kilometres (12 mi)
- Surface elevation: 1,335 metres (4,380 ft)
- References: NVE
- ^{1} Shore length is not a well-defined measure.

Øljusjøane is a lake in Hemsedal Municipality (in Buskerud county) and Lærdal Municipality (in Vestland county), Norway. The 8.45-square-kilometre (3.26 sq mi) lake is located at an elevation of 1,335 metres (4,380 ft) above sea level. It sits about 15 kilometres (9.3 mi) southeast of the village of Borgund and the European route E16 highway. The lake Eldrevatnet is 4 kilometres (2.5 mi) to the north. The lake Juklevatnet and the mountain Høgeloft are both about 12 kilometres (7.5 mi) to the northeast.

Øljusjøane has a hydroelectric dam at the north end which directs water to a power station nearby. The water eventually goes into the Mørkedøla river, a tributary of the Lærdalselvi river.

== See also ==
- List of lakes in Norway
