= Øye, Innlandet =

Village in Vang Municipality, Norway

Øye
- Village
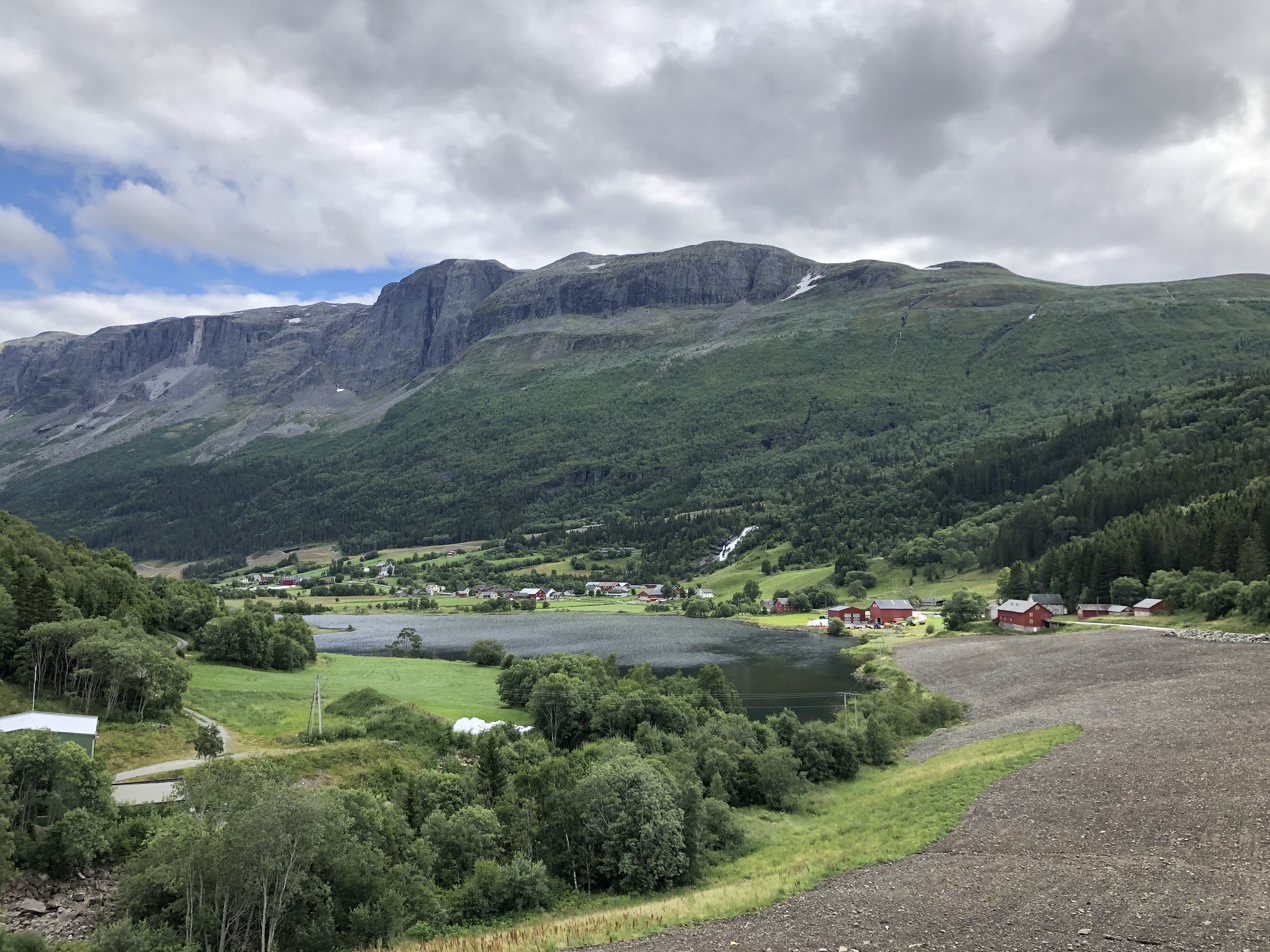
- View of the village
- Interactive map of Øye
- Location within Innlandet Location within Norway
- Coordinates: 61.16738°N 8.39814°E
- Country: Norway
- Region: Eastern Norway
- County: Innlandet
- District: Valdres
- Municipality: Vang Municipality
- Elevation: 484 m (1,588 ft)
- Time zone: UTC+01:00 (CET)
  - Summer (DST): UTC+02:00 (CEST)
- Post Code: 2977 Øye

Øye is a village in Vang Municipality in Innlandet county, Norway. The village is located at the west end of the lake Vangsmjøse, about 12 kilometres (7.5 mi) northwest of the municipal centre of Vang i Valdres and about 10 kilometres (6.2 mi) to the southeast of the rural village of Tyinkrysset. The European route E16 highway runs through the village, heading west through the Filefjell mountains on the way to the west coast of Norway. The historic Øye Stave Church and the newer Øye Church are both located in the village.
