= Eldrevatnet =

Lake in Vestland, Norway

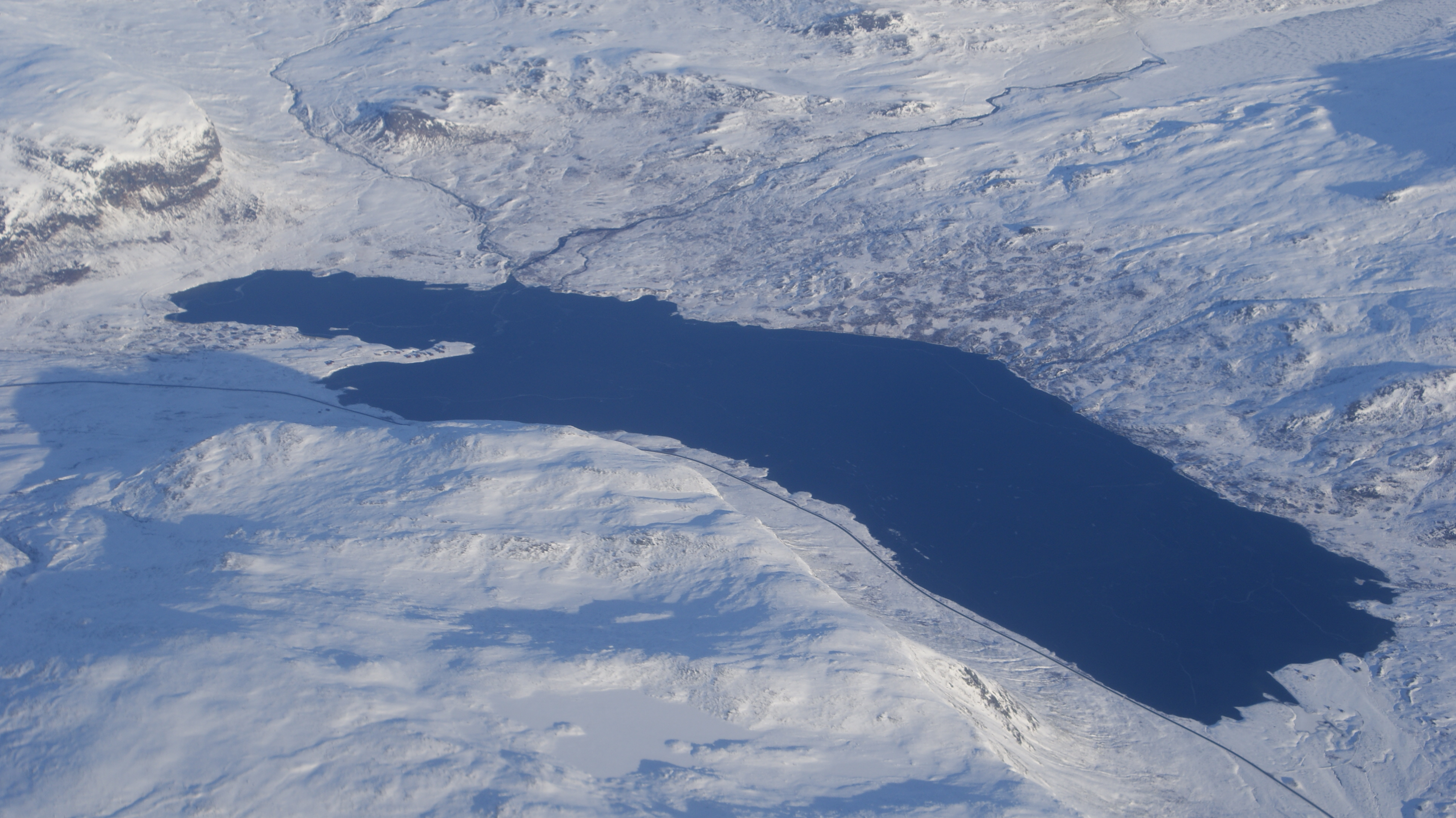
- Interactive map of Eldrevatnet
- Location: Lærdal Municipality, Vestland
- Coordinates: 60°59′35″N 08°09′01″E
- Primary inflows: Jukleåni river Ulvehaugelvi river
- Primary outflows: Mørkedøla river
- Basin countries: Norway
- Max. length: 4.2 kilometres (2.6 mi)
- Max. width: 1 kilometre (0.62 mi)
- Surface area: 3.48 km^{2} (1.34 sq mi)
- Shore length^{1}: 11.66 kilometres (7.25 mi)
- Surface elevation: 1,116 metres (3,661 ft)
- References: NVE
- ^{1} Shore length is not a well-defined measure.

Eldrevatnet is a lake in Lærdal Municipality in Vestland county, Norway. The 3.48-square-kilometre (1.34 sq mi) lake lies at an elevation of 1,116 metres (3,661 ft) above sea level. It is located about 15 kilometres (9.3 mi) southeast of the village of Borgund, not far from the European route E16 highway and the Filefjell Kongevegen road. The lake Øljusjøane lies 4 kilometres (2.5 mi) south of the lake. The lake Juklevatnet and the mountain Høgeloft both lie about 5 kilometres (3.1 mi) to the northeast of the lake.

The lake Eldrevatnet is regulated by a hydroelectric dam and supplies water for a nearby power station.

== See also ==
- List of lakes in Norway
