= Suletinden =

Mountain in Innlandet, Norway

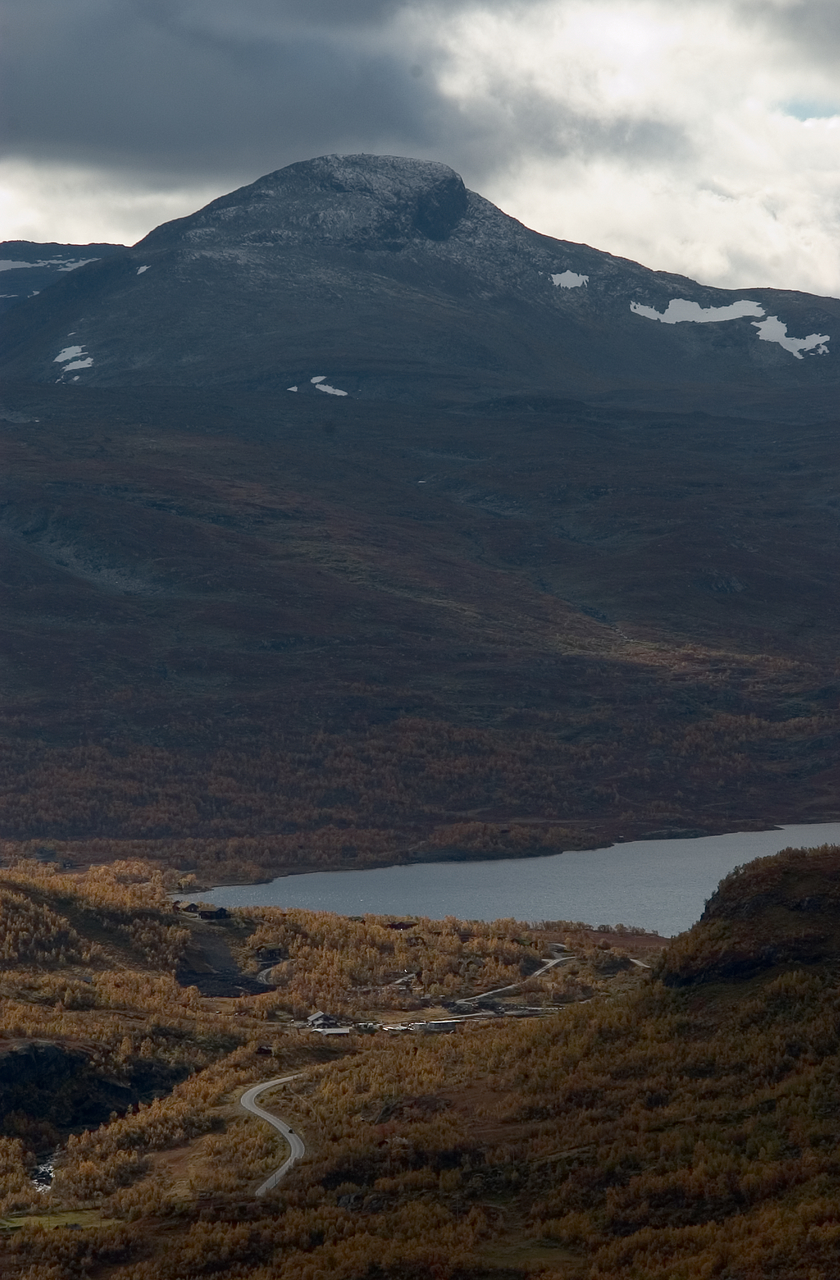
- View of the mountain

Highest point
- Elevation: 1,780 m (5,840 ft)
- Prominence: 322 m (1,056 ft)
- Parent peak: Ranastongi
- Isolation: 5.3 km (3.3 mi) to Sulefjellet
- Coordinates: 61°07′22″N 8°07′36″E

Geography
- Interactive map of the mountain
- Location: Innlandet and Vestland, Norway
- Parent range: Filefjell

Suletinden is a mountain in Norway. The mountain sits on the border of Vang Municipality in Innlandet county and Lærdal Municipality in Vestland county. The 1,780-metre (5,840 ft) tall mountain is located in the Filefjell mountain area, about 25 kilometres (16 mi) west of the village of Vang i Valdres. The mountain is surrounded by several other notable mountains including Sulefjellet, Høgeloft, and Skoddetinden to the southeast.

== See also ==
- List of mountains of Norway by height
