= Ranastongi =

Mountain in Innlandet, Norway

- Ranastøngji (unofficial)
- Interactive map of the mountain

Highest point
- Elevation: 1,900 m (6,200 ft)
- Prominence: 460 m (1,510 ft)
- Parent peak: Store Jukleggi
- Isolation: 16.4 km (10.2 mi) to Høgeloft
- Coordinates: 61°01′06″N 8°30′34″E

Geography
- Location: Innlandet, Norway
- Parent range: Filefjell

Ranastongi is a mountain on the border of Vang Municipality in Innlandet county and Hemsedal Municipality in Buskerud county, Norway. The 1,900-metre (6,200 ft) tall mountain is located about 12 kilometres (7.5 mi) south of the village of Vang i Valdres and about 18 kilometres (11 mi) north of the village of Trøym. The mountain is surrounded by several other notable mountains including Rankonøse and Klanten to the north, Storebottegge to the northwest, Veslebotnskarvet to the southeast, and Blåkampen to the east.

== See also ==
- List of mountains of Norway by height
