= Blåkampen =

Mountain in Innlandet, Norway

- Interactive map of the mountain

Highest point
- Elevation: 1,662 m (5,453 ft)
- Prominence: 49 m (161 ft)
- Parent peak: Graskarvet
- Isolation: 1.9 km (1.2 mi)
- Coordinates: 60°58′47″N 8°41′41″E

Geography
- Location: Innlandet, Norway
- Parent range: Filefjell

Blåkampen is a mountain in Vang Municipality in Innlandet county, Norway. The 1,662-metre (5,453 ft) tall mountain is located in the Filefjell mountain area, about 17 kilometres (11 mi) southeast of the village of Vang i Valdres. The mountain is surrounded by several other notable mountains including Gilafjellet to the north, Veslebotnskarvet and Skogshorn to the south, and Ranastongi and Klanten to the northwest. The lower elevations of the eastern side of the mountain extend into the neighboring Vestre Slidre Municipality.

== See also ==
- List of mountains of Norway by height
