= Øye Church (Innlandet) =

Church in Innlandet, Norway

- Øye kyrkje
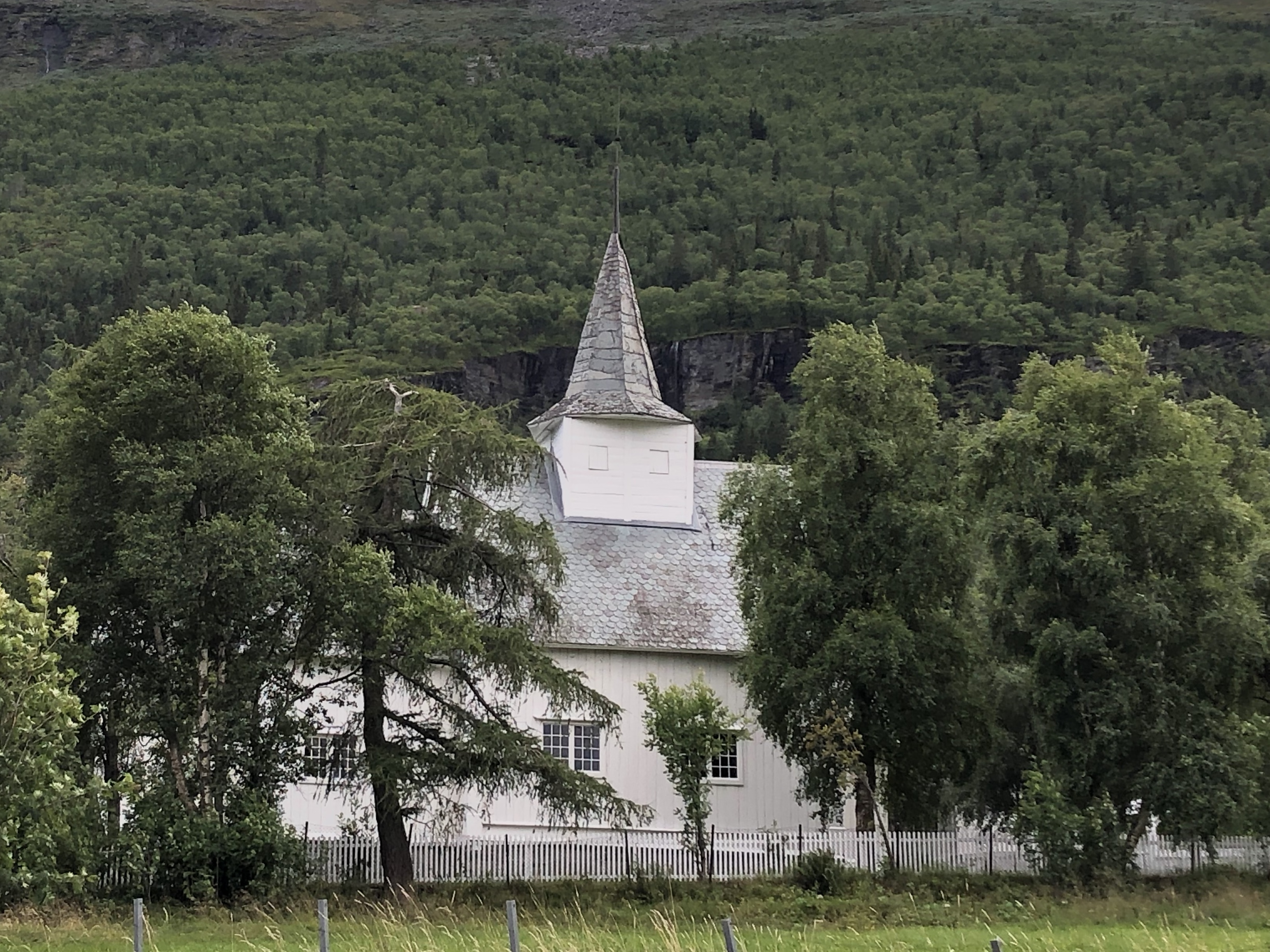
- View of the church
- Øye Church
- 61°10′02″N 8°23′58″E
- Location: Vang Municipality, Innlandet
- Country: Norway
- Denomination: Church of Norway
- Churchmanship: Evangelical Lutheran

History
- Status: Parish church
- Founded: 1747
- Consecrated: 1747

Architecture
- Functional status: Active
- Architectural type: Long church
- Completed: 1747 (279 years ago)

Specifications
- Capacity: 120
- Materials: Wood

Administration
- Diocese: Hamar bispedømme
- Deanery: Valdres prosti
- Parish: Øye
- Norwegian Cultural Heritage Site
- Type: Church
- Status: Not protected
- ID: 85935

Øye Church (Norwegian: Øye kyrkje) is a parish church of the Church of Norway in Vang Municipality in Innlandet county, Norway. It is located in the village of Øye. It is one of the churches for the Øye parish which is part of the Valdres prosti (deanery) in the Diocese of Hamar. The white, wooden church was built in a long church design in 1747 using plans drawn up by an unknown architect. The church seats about 120 people.

== History ==
The old Øye Stave Church was centuries old when in 1745 it was decided to tear down the old church and to build a new Øye Church on a new site about 400 metres (1,300 ft) to the southwest of the old church. This location was problematic over the years. The land was somewhat boggy and the nearby river Rødøla would flood almost every spring and this led to grave sites being disturbed (legend says the coffins would sometimes float to the surface during the flooding). The old Øye Stave Church was torn down and the new church was built in 1746-1747 and the lead builder was Lieutenant C.F. Stielau. It was a half-timbered long church with a rectangular nave and a smaller, rectangular chancel. In 1900, a sacristy was built on the east end of the chancel. The new church was consecrated in 1747.

In 1965, a newly reconstructed Øye Stave Church was built across the street from Øye Church using some of the old materials of the church.

== Media gallery ==
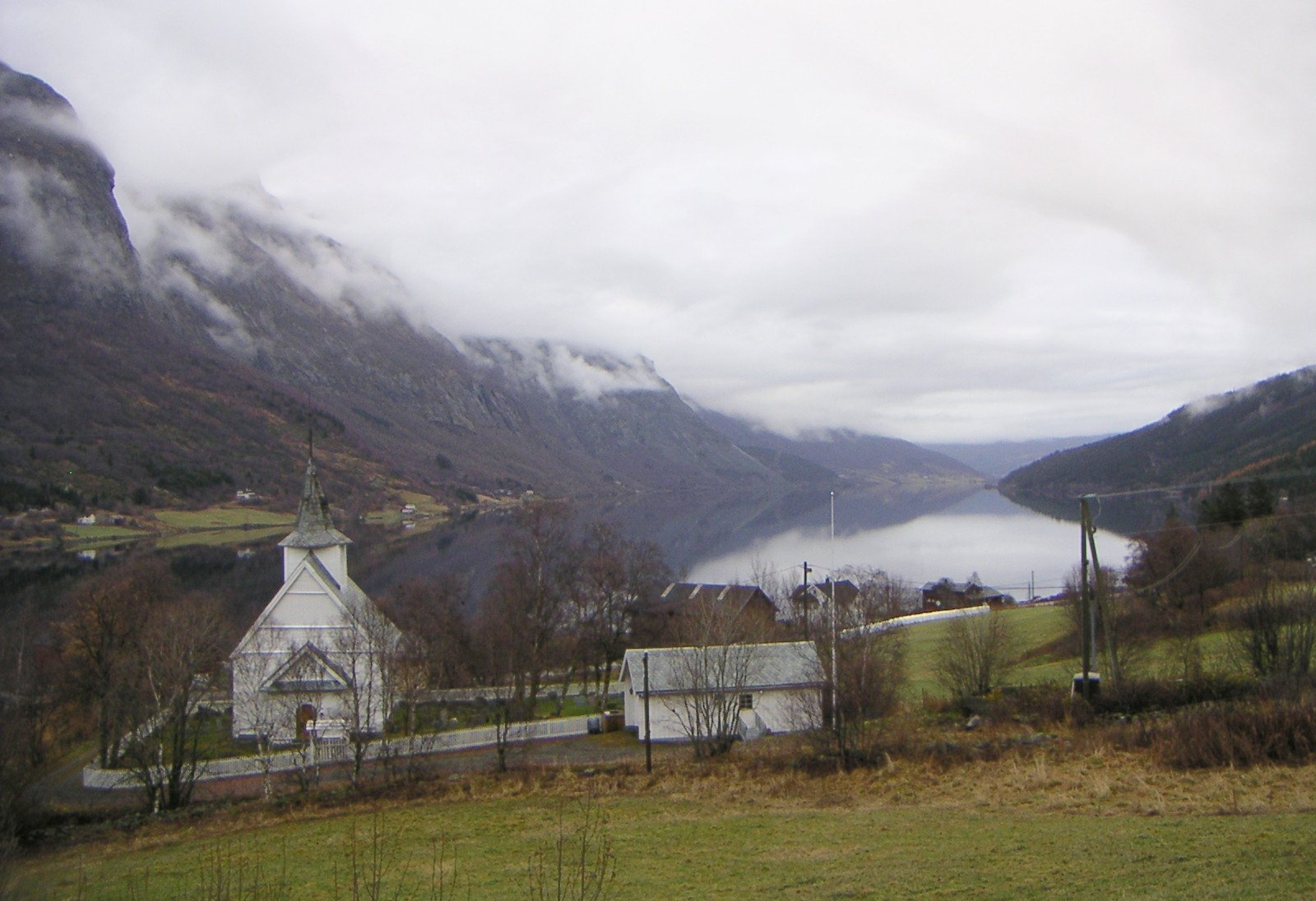

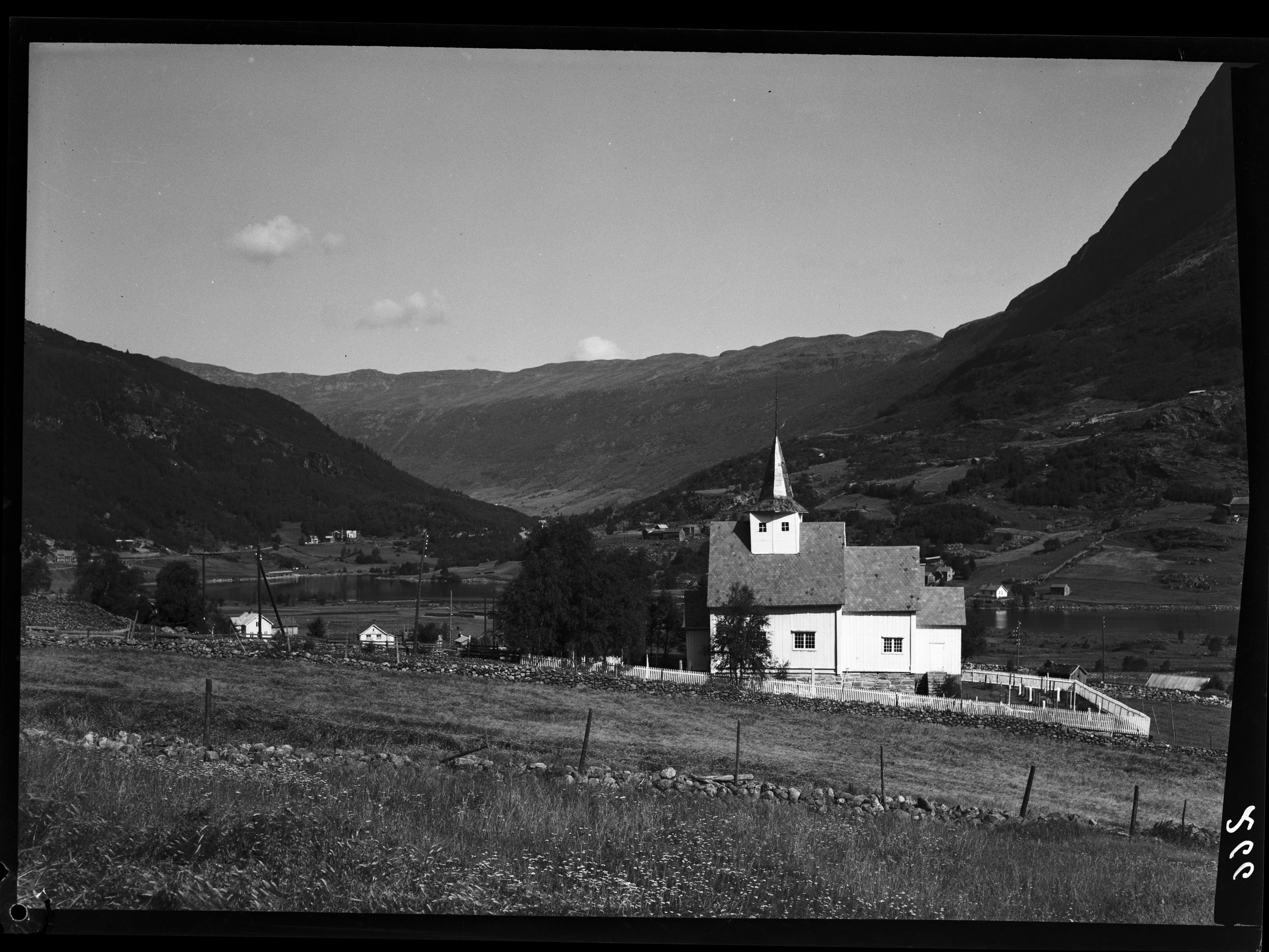

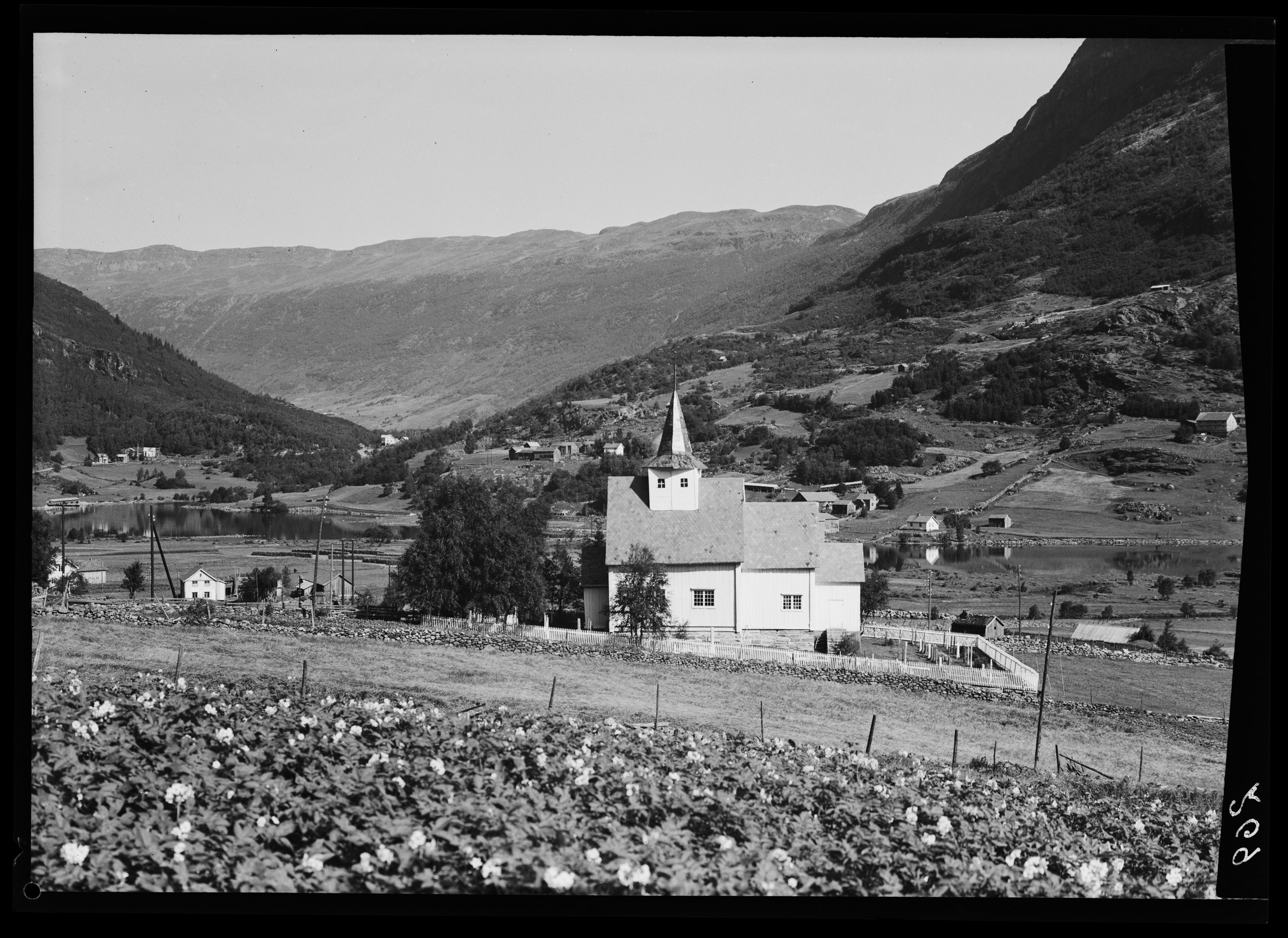

== See also ==
- Øye Stave Church
- List of churches in Hamar
