= Veslebotnskarvet =

Mountain in Norway

Coordinates: 60°56′N 8°37′E

Highest point
- Elevation: 1,778.4 m (5,835 ft)
- Prominence: 630 m (2,070 ft)
- Isolation: 8.65 km (5.37 mi) to Ranastongi

Geography
- Location: Buskerud, Norway

Veslebotnskarvet is a mountain of Hemsedal municipality, Buskerud, in southern Norway.
