= Juklevatnet =

Lake on Vestland/Viken border in Norway

- Interactive map of Juklevatnet
- Location: Vestland/Buskerud
- Coordinates: 61°1′41″N 8°14′25″E
- Basin countries: Norway
- Surface area: 3.07 km^{2} (1.19 sq mi)
- Shore length^{1}: 10.32 kilometres (6.41 mi)
- Surface elevation: 1,286 metres (4,219 ft)
- References: NVE
- ^{1} Shore length is not a well-defined measure.

Juklevatnet is a lake in Hemsedal Municipality (in Buskerud county) and Lærdal Municipality (in Vestland county), Norway. It is located 21 kilometres (13 mi) east of Borgund in Lærdal Municipality, just to the south of the mountain Høgeloft in the Filefjell range. The 3.07-square-kilometre (1.19 sq mi) lake sits at an elevation of 1,286 metres (4,219 ft) above sea level. It is located 5 kilometres (3.1 mi) northeast of the lake Eldrevatnet and 10 kilometres (6.2 mi) northeast of the lake Øljusjøane.

The lake is regulated by a hydroelectric dam which is part of a nearby power station. The water flows into the lake Vesle Juklevatnet, then the river Jukleåni, and then into the lake Eldrevatnet.

== See also ==
- List of lakes in Norway
