= Vangsmjøse =

Lake in Innlandet, Norway

- Vangsmjøsa / Vangsmjøsi (unofficial)
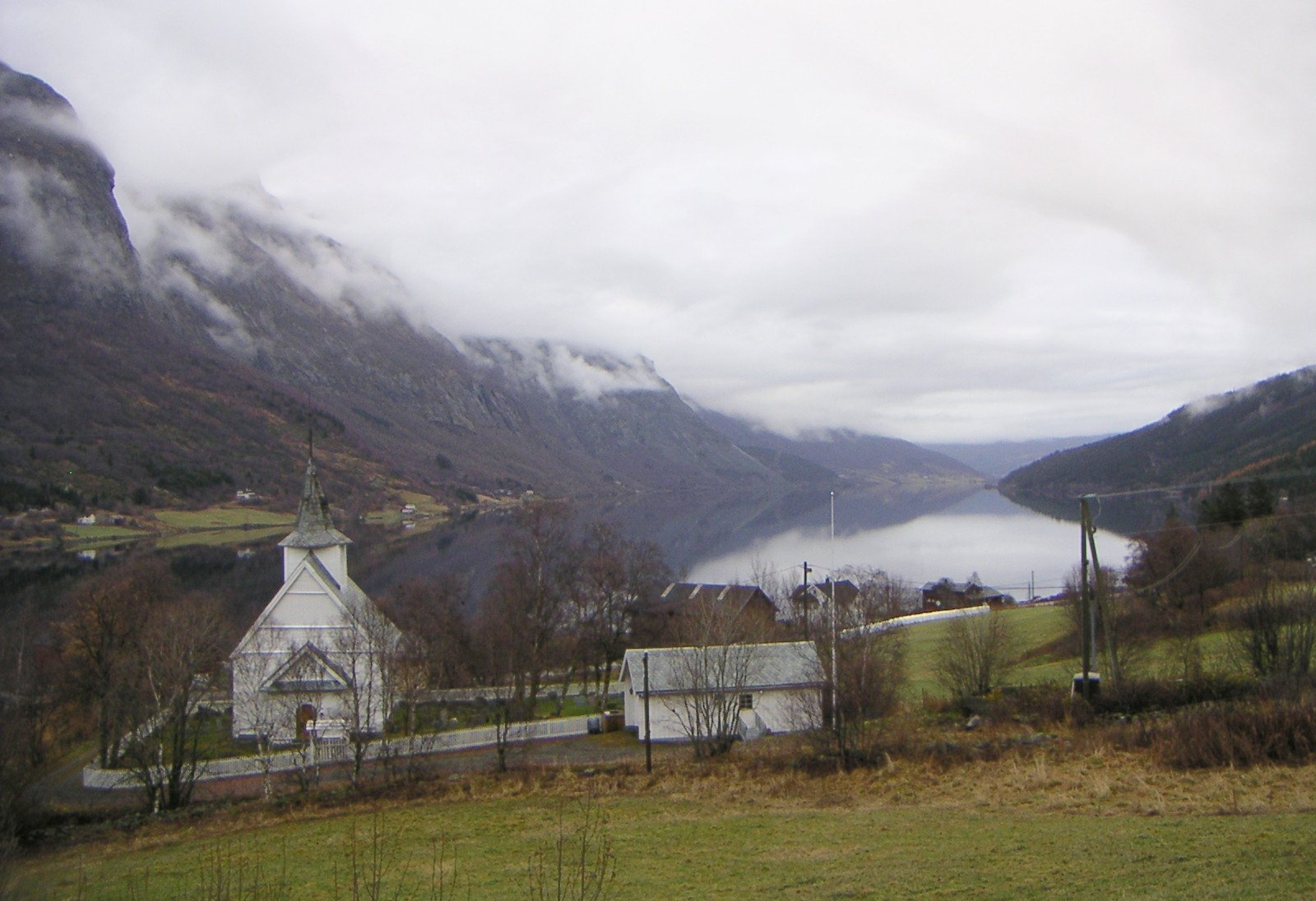
- View of the lake
- Interactive map of the lake
- Location: Vang Municipality, Innlandet
- Coordinates: 61°09′46″N 08°26′30″E
- Basin countries: Norway
- Max. length: 13 kilometres (8.1 mi)
- Max. width: 2 kilometres (1.2 mi)
- Surface area: 18.448 km^{2} (7.123 sq mi)
- Max. depth: 154 metres (505 ft)
- Shore length^{1}: 43.47 kilometres (27.01 mi)
- Surface elevation: 466 metres (1,529 ft)
- References: NVE
- ^{1} Shore length is not a well-defined measure.

Vangsmjøse is a lake in Vang Municipality in Innlandet county, Norway. The lake has an area of 18.448 square kilometres (7.123 sq mi) and it has a maximum depth of about 154 metres (505 ft) deep. A local myth says that if a raw ham is lowered into the deepest part of Vangsmjøse, it will be boiled when it is pulled back up. The lake sits at an elevation of 466 metres (1,529 ft) above sea level and it has a shoreline measuring about 43.5 kilometres (27.0 mi) around.

Øye Stave Church is situated in the village of Øye which sits at the west end of Vangsmjøse. The scenic European route E16 runs through Øye and along the south shore of Vangsmjøse.

== Media gallery ==
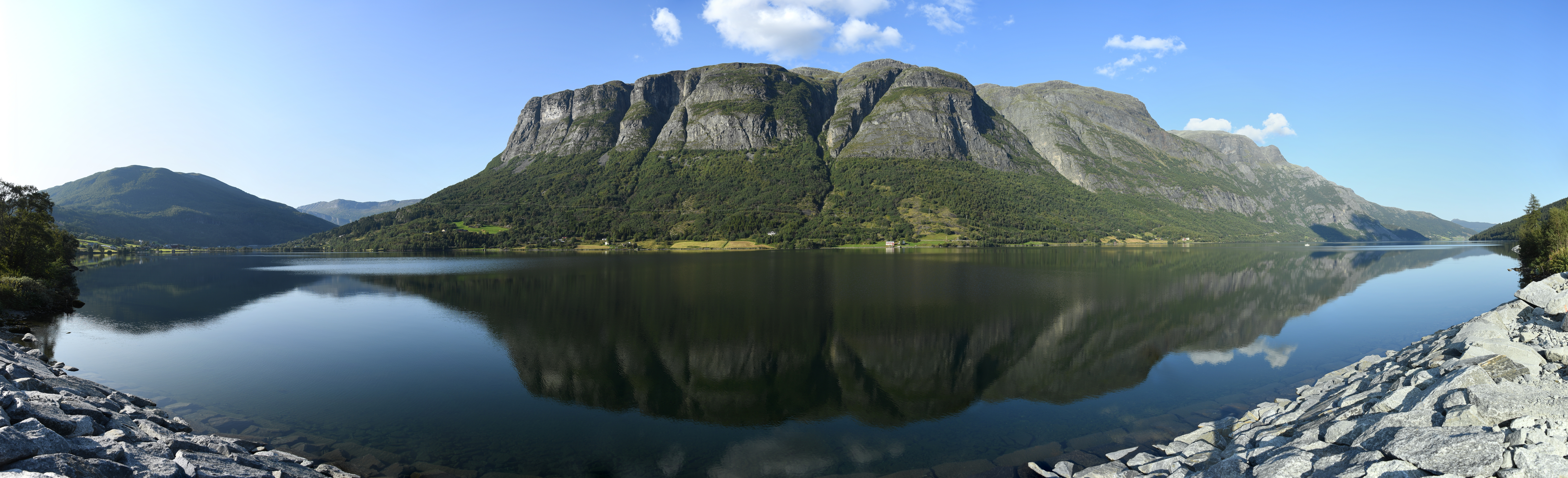
Panorama of the western part of the lake

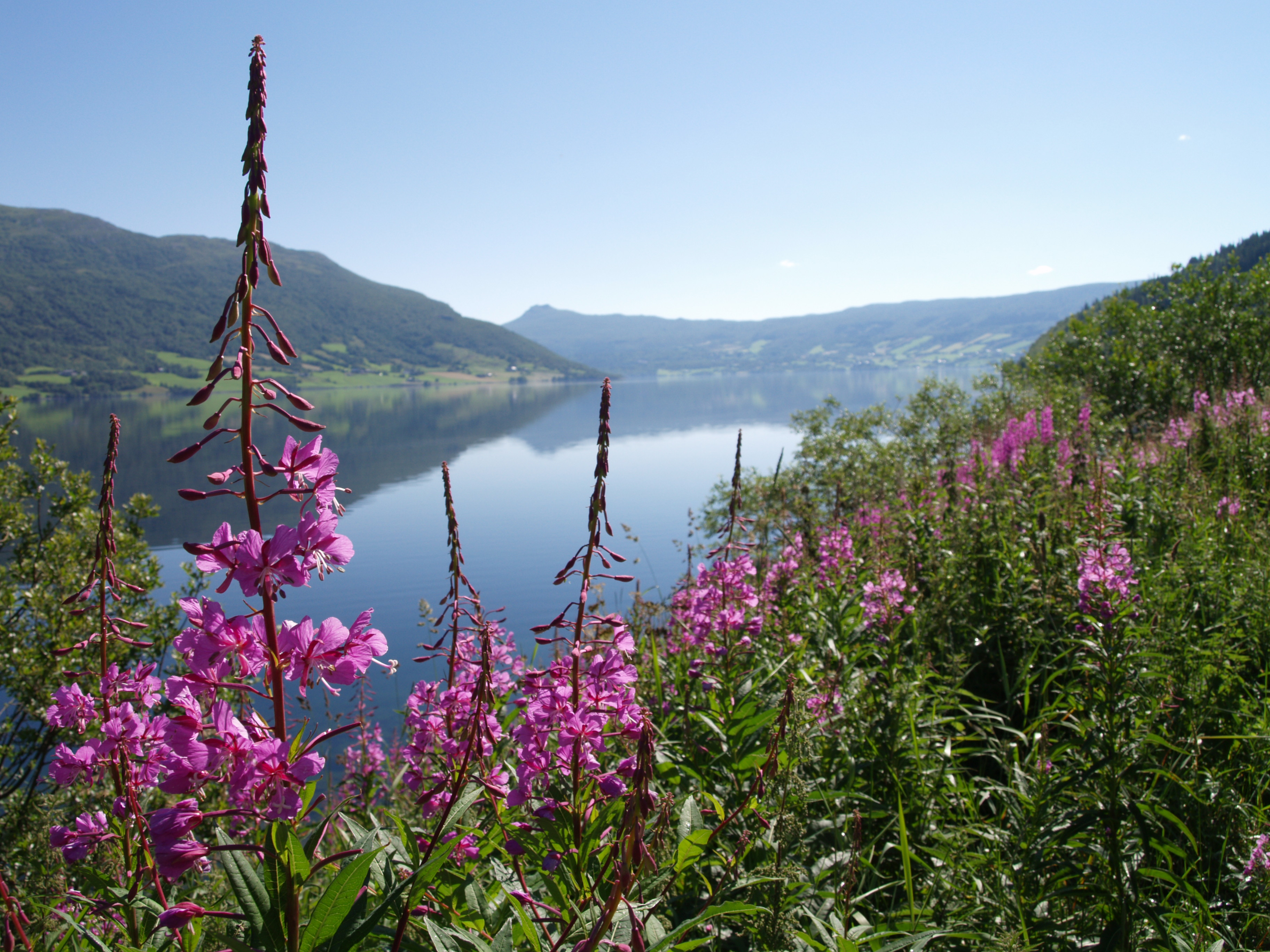
Other view of Vangsmjøse

== See also ==
- List of lakes in Norway
