= Ole Øvergaard =

Norwegian architect (1893–1972)

Ole Bernhard Øvergaard
- Born: November 29, 1893; Fredrikstad, Østfold, Norway
- Died: June 30, 1972 (aged 78); Oslo, Norway
- Education: Norwegian Institute of Technology (graduated 1916)
- Occupation: Architect
- Notable work: Norwegian Radium Hospital, Kringkastingshuset, Hotel Continental extension
- Awards: President, National Association of Norwegian Architects (1956–1960)
- Practice: Oslo, Norway

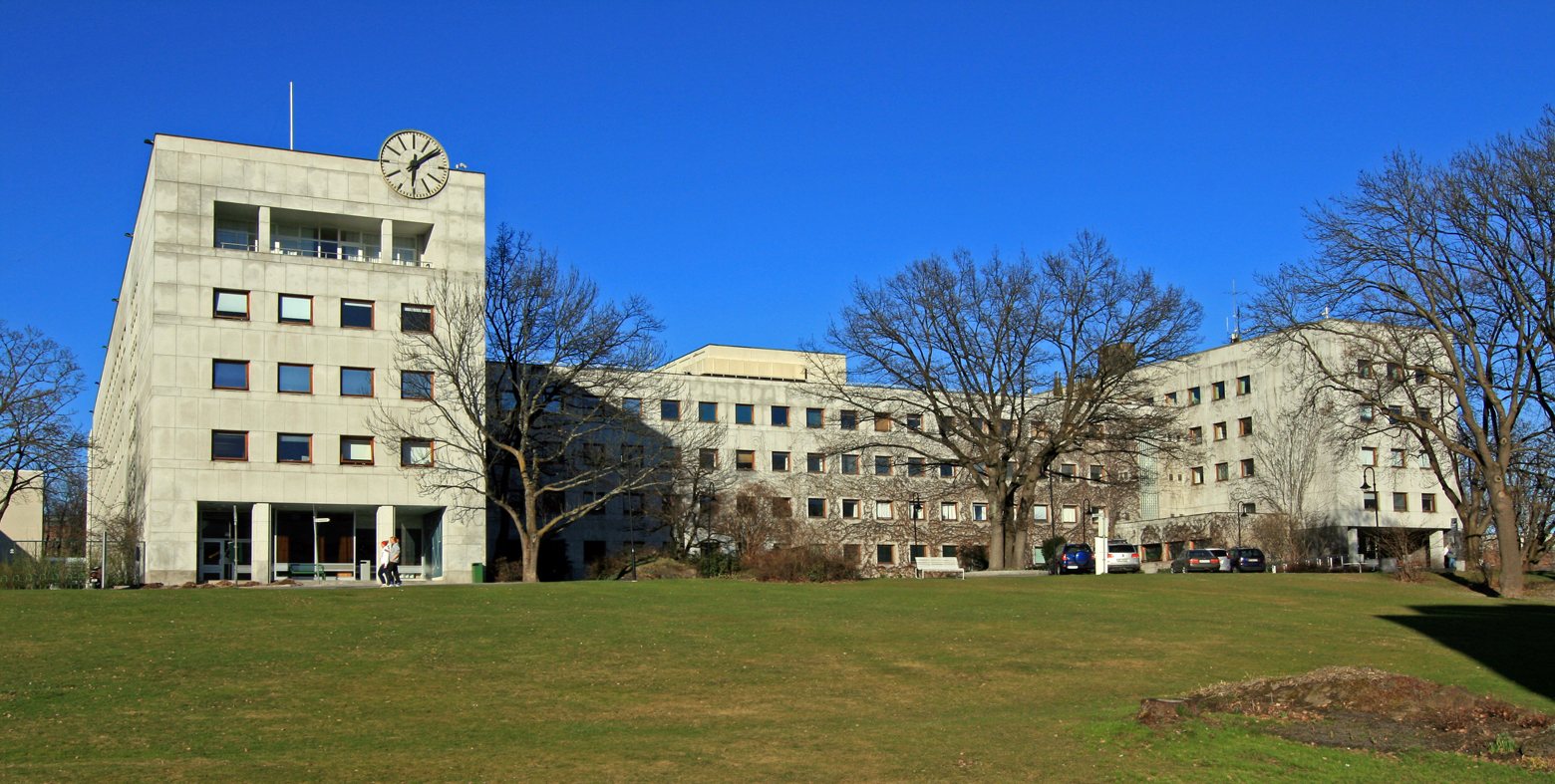
Kringkastingshuse NRK headquarters at Marienlyst (1969)

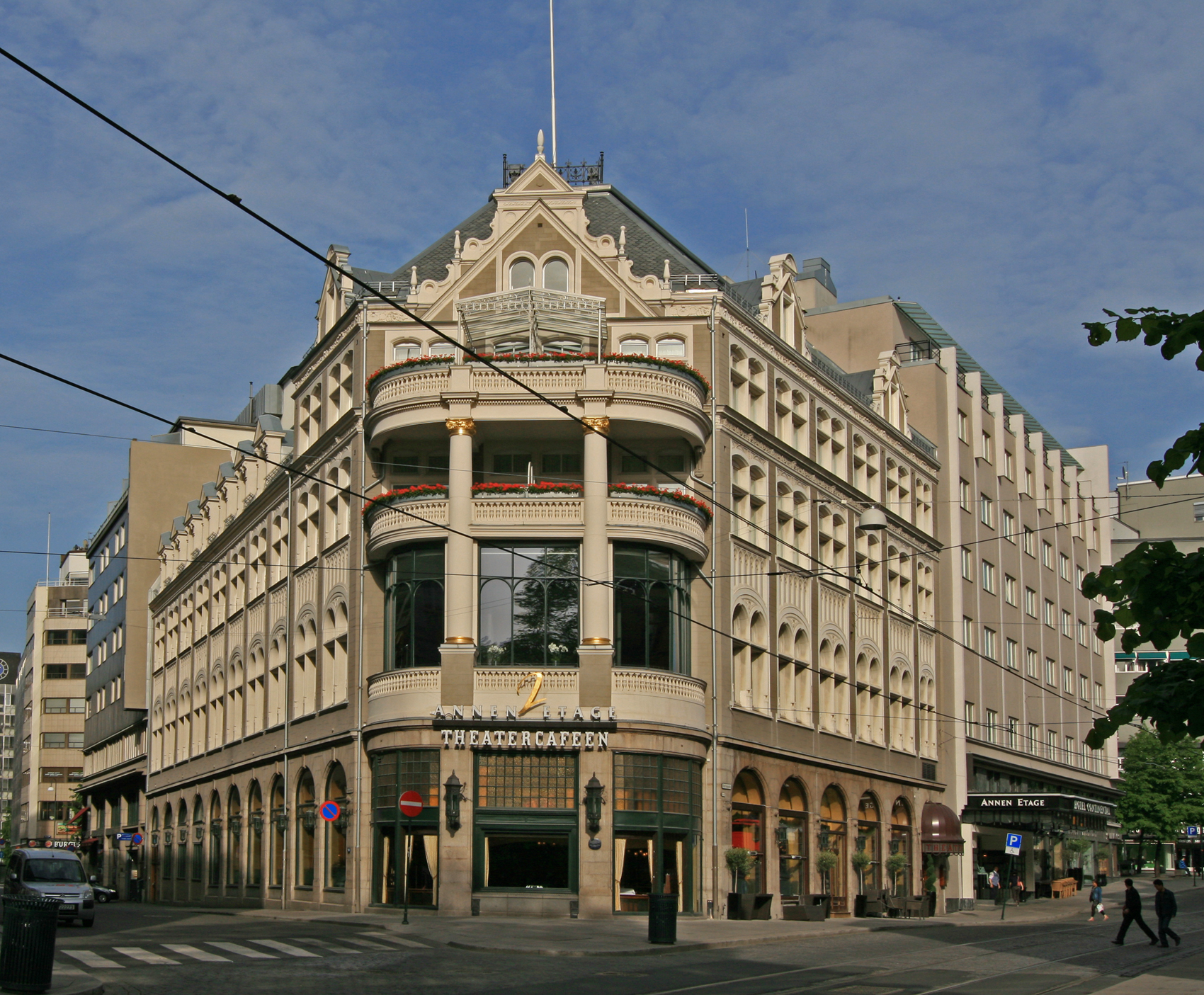
Hotel Continental extension (1961)

Ole Bernhard Øvergaard (29 November 1893 – 30 June 1972) was a Norwegian architect.

Ole Bernhard Øvergaard was born at Fredrikstad in Østfold, Norway. He graduated from the Norwegian Institute of Technology in 1916. Øvergaard worked as assistant to Magnus Poulsson in Christiania (now Oslo) in 1916 to 1917 and with Olaf Nordhagen in Trondheim in 1917. During the 1920s, he went on study trips to Sweden, Denmark, France, England and Italy. From 1922 he had his own practice in Christiania, the first two years together with Lars Backer.

Øvergaard specialized in hospital and was influential within the genre for decades. He also designed residential complexes. Important buildings designed by Øvergaard include the Norwegian Radium Hospital. Together with Nils Holter (1899-1995), he designed Kringkastingshuset (commonly known as Det hvite hus), headquarters of Norwegian Broadcasting Corporation at Marienlyst in Oslo. Øvergaard also designed an extension to the Hotel Continental in Oslo (1960–61). From 1956 to 1960 he presided over the National Association of Norwegian Architects.

== Other sources ==
- Sandnes, Svein; Morten Krogvold (2000) Det hvite hus. Byggehistorien til Kringkastinghuset på Marienlyst (Oslo)
