= Filefjell Kongevegen =

Trail in Norway

Coordinates: 61.1520°N 8.0055°E

The Filefjell Kongevegen (English: The Kings Road) is the name of the old trail over Filefjell, the mountainous area between Lærdal/Borgund and Valdres in Norway. It is the historical main route linking Western Norway and Eastern Norway.

Due to the sometimes wet and marshy land in the valley bottom, the old trail runs further up in the hill than the modern asphalt road does today. The old trail is still used for hiking. It was named after King Sverre of Norway (1184–1202) who traveled this route with his army. The first post route came this way in 1647. The road got official status as a main road in the year 1791.

Maristova in Filefjell (built at Queen Margaret's command around 1390) and Nystuen in Vang Municipality (first mentioned in 1627, but believed to be much older) are guest houses that provided for travelers along the road. The owners were compensated by the king and commanded to aid travelers and provide shelter for those who used the road. This practice lasted until 1830.

== Filefjell Kongevegen as a hiking trail ==
Today, Kongevegen has been restored, opening it up for hikers. Major sections such as Vindhella provide an insight into the skills in use by the road engineers of the time.

The entire hiking trail takes between 3 and 6 days for most hikers. There are guided tours for group hikes, but it is also possible to hike alone. Some tourists spend the nights at the mountain cabins along the trail, while others opt for tenting.

The hiking season for Filefjell Kongevegen is typically between May 1 and October 15.

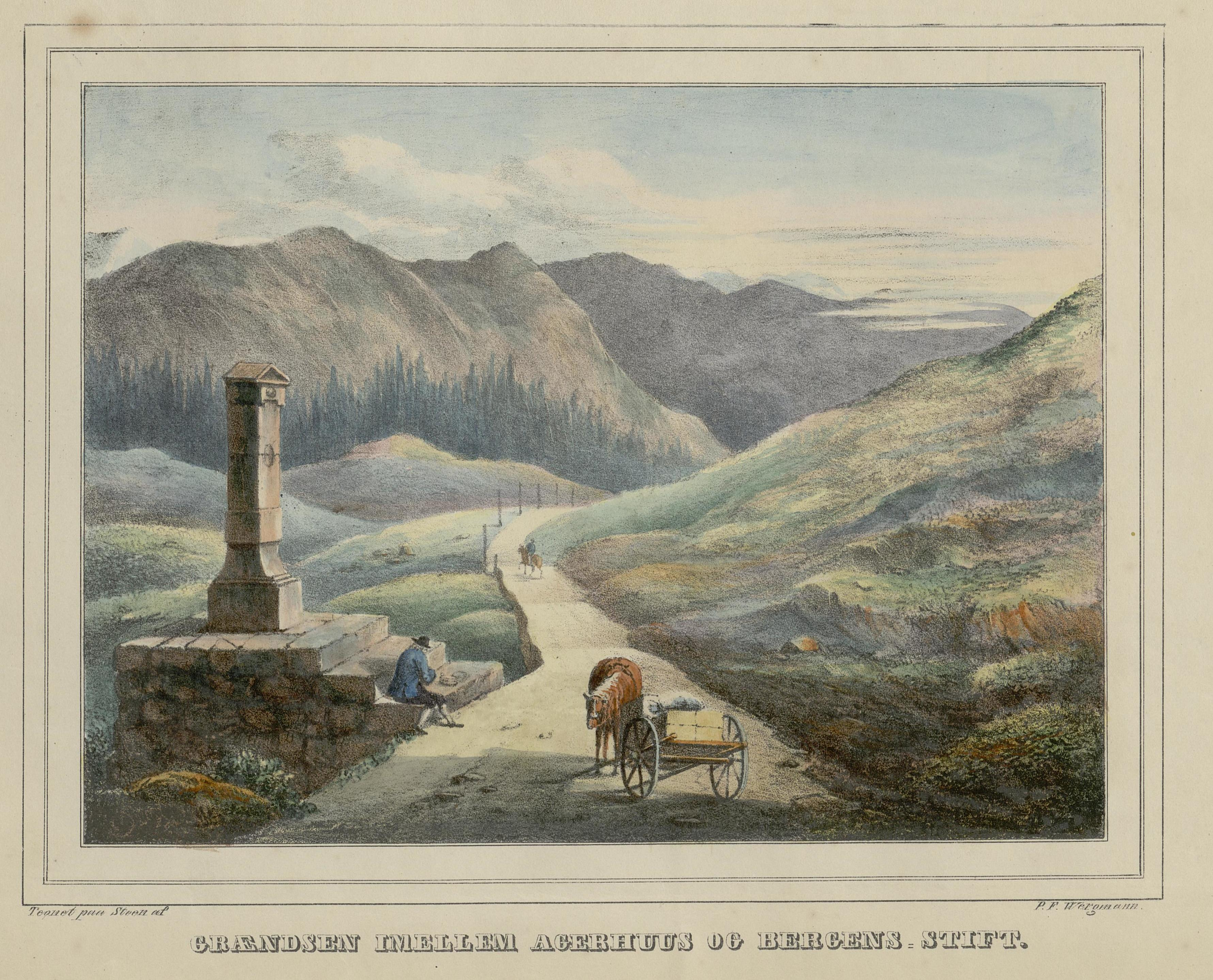
Murklopphaugen with the marble marker indicating the border between Akershus and Bergen in the old days, from Norsk Prospect-Samling by P.F. Wergmann.
