= Høgeloft =

Mountain in southern Norway

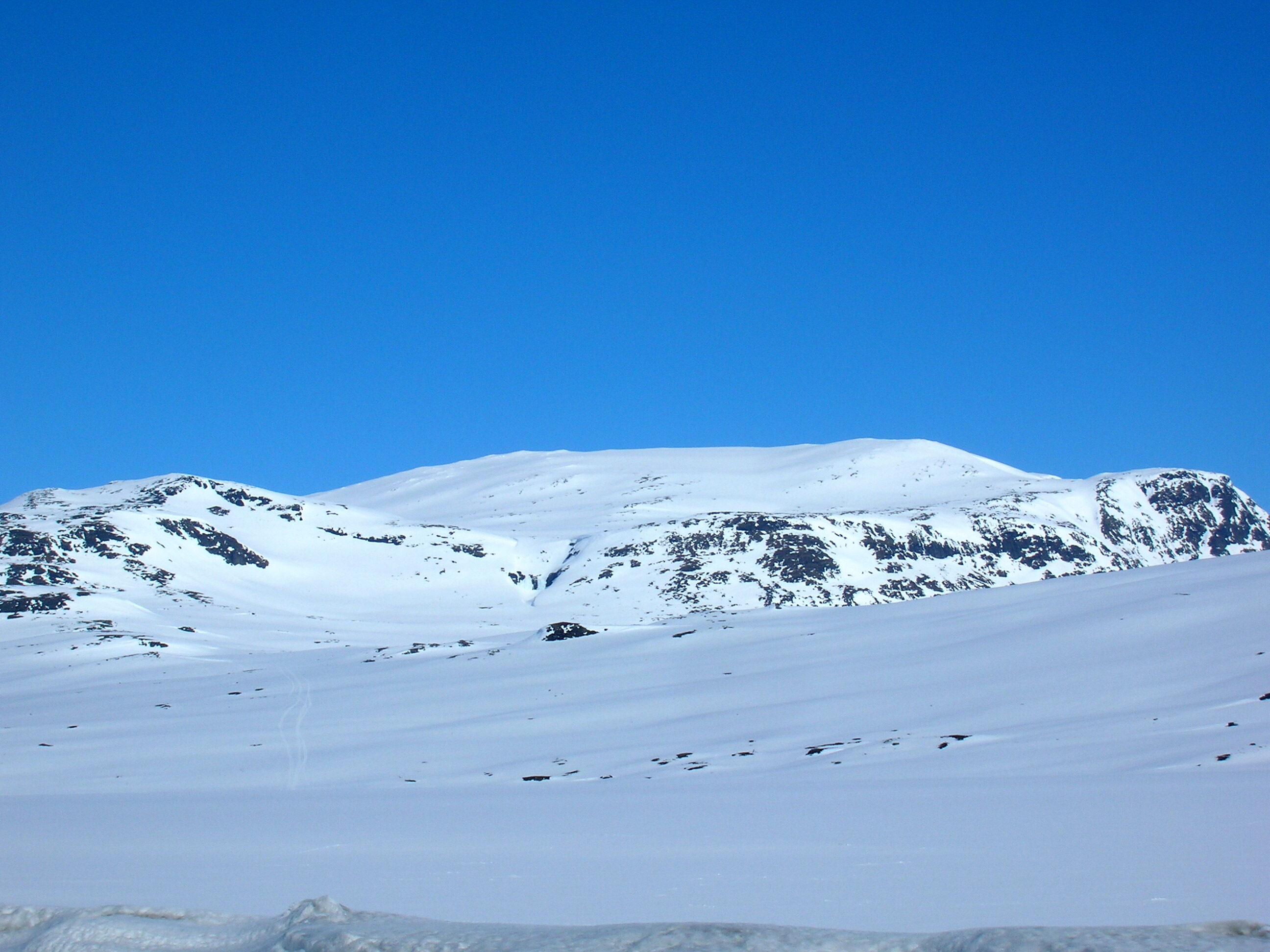
- The massif of Jukleeggi, Høgeloft is right behind.

Highest point
- Elevation: 1,920 m (6,300 ft)
- Prominence: 788 m (2,585 ft)
- Isolation: 35 km (22 mi)
- Coordinates: 61°03′14″N 8°12′52″E

Geography
- Location: Vestland, Norway
- Parent range: Filefjell
- Topo map: 1517 II Øye

Høgeloft is a mountain on the border between Lærdal Municipality (in Vestland county) and Hemsedal Municipality (in Buskerud county), Norway. At 1,920 metres (6,300 ft) above sea level, it is the highest mountain in the Filefjell mountain range. Høgeloft is one of the mountains in the Hemsedal Top 20 group.

Høgeloft is located about 22 kilometres (14 mi) east of the village of Borgund in Lærdal Municipality, not far from the European route E16 highway and the old Filefjell Kongevegen road. The lake Juklevatnet lies at the southern base of the mountain and the lake Eldrevatnet lies 5 kilometres (3.1 mi) to the southwest of the mountain.
