= Vang i Valdres =

Village in Vang Municipality, Norway

Vang i Valdres Vang / Vangssokni / Grindaheim
- Village
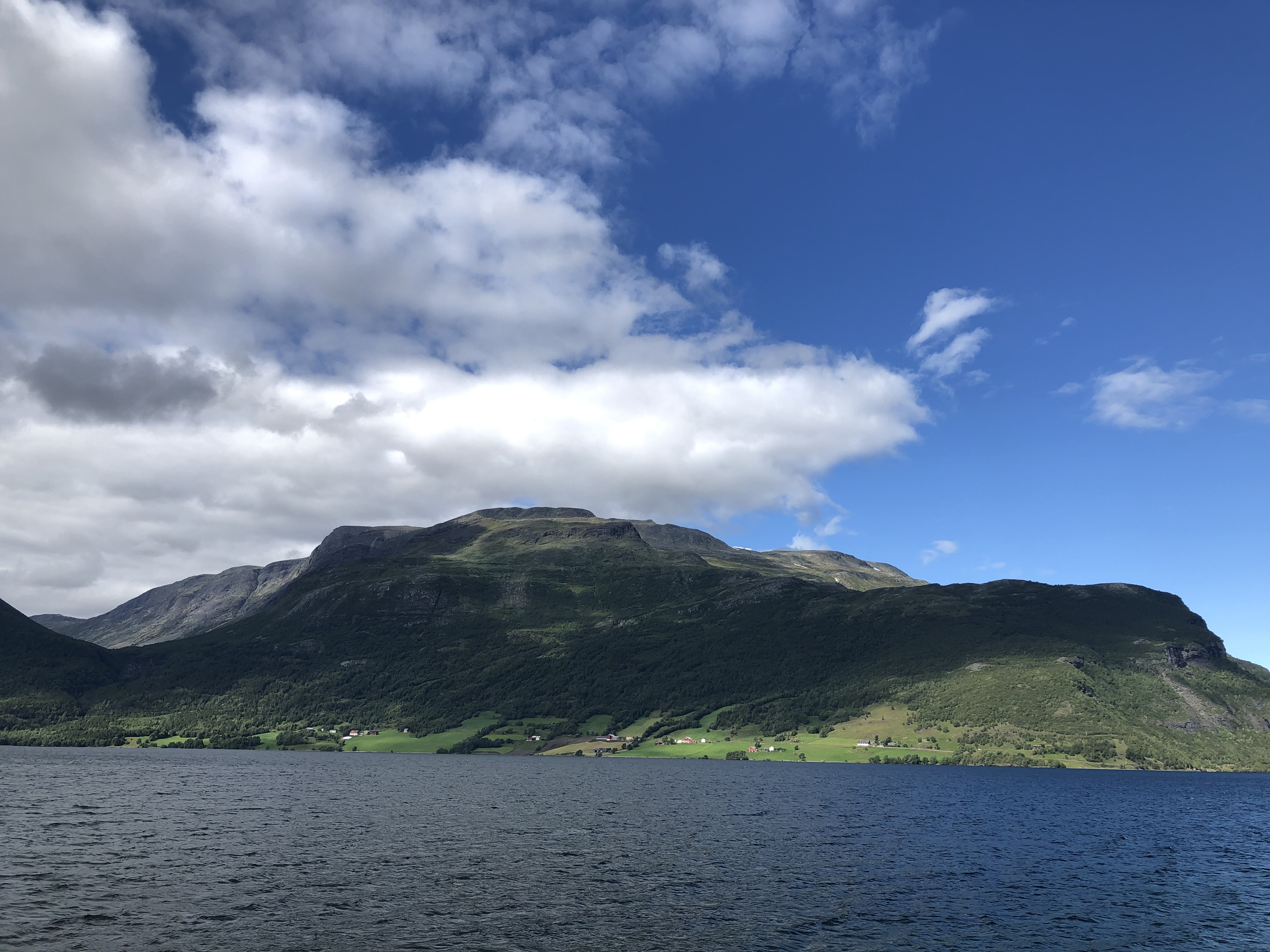
- View from the village looking north, across the lake Vangsmjøse
- Interactive map of Vang i Valdres
- Location within Innlandet Location within Norway
- Coordinates: 61.12508°N 8.57076°E
- Country: Norway
- Region: Eastern Norway
- County: Innlandet
- District: Valdres
- Municipality: Vang Municipality

Area
  - Total: 0.24 km^{2} (0.093 sq mi)
- Elevation: 479 m (1,572 ft)

Population (2024)
  - Total: 232
  - Density: 892/km^{2} (2,310/sq mi)
- Time zone: UTC+01:00 (CET)
  - Summer (DST): UTC+02:00 (CEST)
- Post Code: 2975 Vang i Valdres

Vang i Valdres or Grindaheim is the administrative centre of Vang Municipality in Innlandet county, Norway. The village is located on the south shore of the lake Vangsmjøse, about 20 kilometres (12 mi) west of the village of Ryfoss and about 10 kilometres (6.2 mi) southeast of the village of Øye. The European route E16 highway runs through the village, heading west through the Filefjell mountains on the way to the west coast of Norway. The historic Vang Church is located in the village.

The 0.24-square-kilometre (59-acre) village has a population (2024) of 232 and a population density of 892 inhabitants per square kilometre (2,310/sq mi).
