= Filefjell =

Mountainous area in Norway

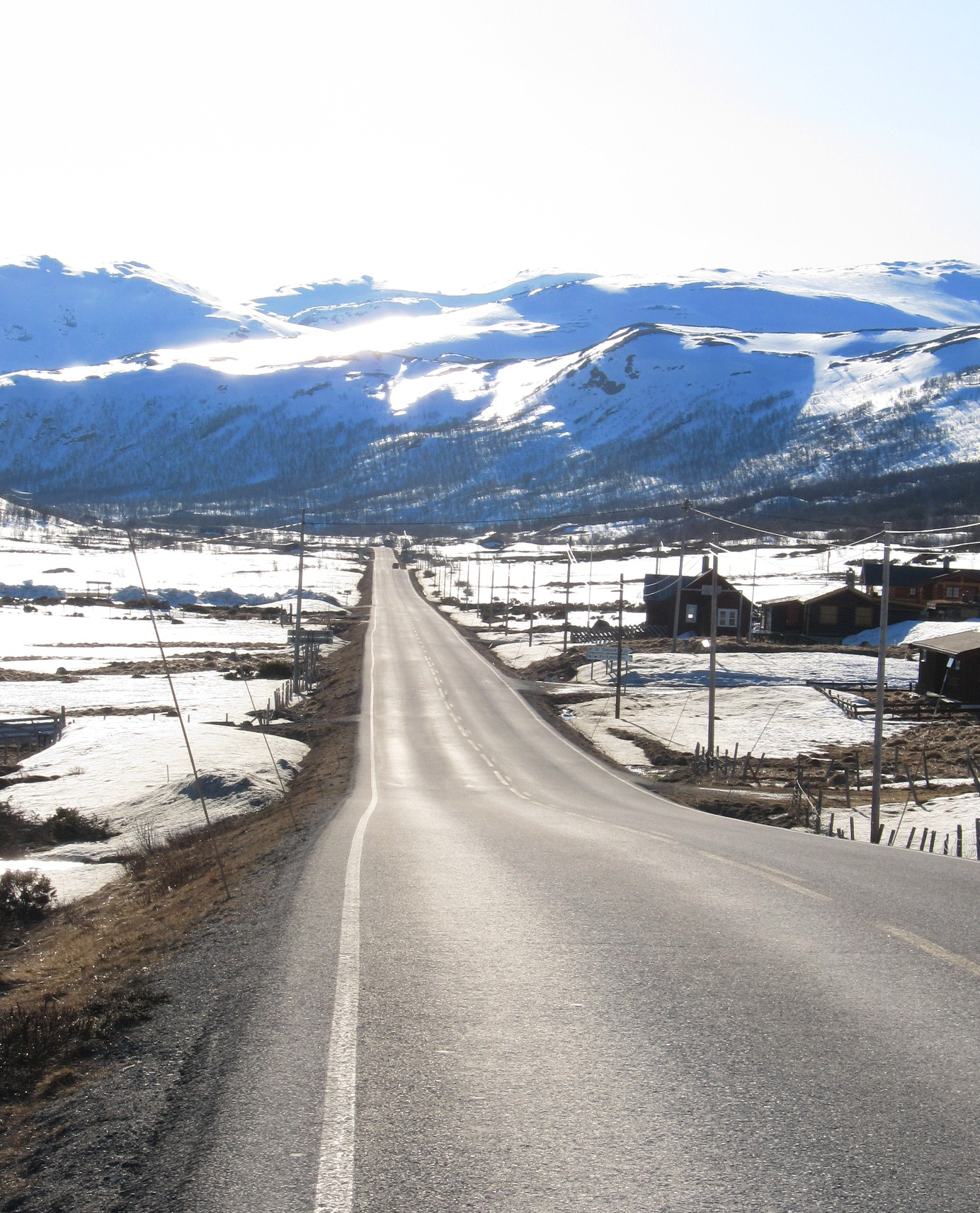

Highest point
- Peak: Høgeloft, Lærdal and Hemsedal, Norway
- Elevation: 1,920 m (6,300 ft)
- Coordinates: 61.05391°N 8.21443°E

Geography
- Location: Innlandet, Norway
- Range coordinates: 61.17919°N 8.07555°E

Filefjell is a mountainous area in Norway. It is located in an area where three counties meet. It lies between Lærdal Municipality in the Vestland county in the west and Vang Municipality in Innlandet county in the east and it lies north of Hemsedal Municipality in Buskerud county. It is the historical, as well as modern, main route, linking Western Norway and Eastern Norway. The European route E16 highway passes through Filefjell.

== Etymology ==
Filefjell or sometimes Fillefjell, might be a double-name as "file" is thought to be derived from Old Norse word Fjáll, the same root that evolved into the modern word "fjell". Thus Filefjell in English would be "Mountain-Mountain".

== Geography ==
Filefjell stretches from Lærdal Municipality in the eastern part of Vestland county, at the innermost part of the Sognefjorden, to Vang Municipality in Valdres in the western part of Innlandet county. In the north, it borders the western part of the Jotunheimen mountain range. To the south, it meets with the Buskerud county border in Hemsedal Municipality. The European route E16 crosses the mountain area and reaches its highest point at the 1,013-metre (3,323 ft) Varden. The road follows a valley through the mountainous area, and because of this is somewhat protected from the fierce weather of the Norwegian winter. The road is rarely closed due to wind or snow, making it the most reliable of the mountain passes in Norway.

On both sides of the valley the terrain climbs steeply up to plateaus, with rolling hills and numerous lakes at sitting at elevations of about 1,300 metres (4,300 ft). The highest peak of the range is Sulefjellet at 1,812 metres (5,945 ft).

== Flora and fauna ==
The biology of Filefjell is the same as most other Norwegian mountain areas. In the main valley, birch and species of salicaceae grows up to elevations of about 1,200 metres (3,900 ft). Higher up, the landscape can be described as a tundra where moss and different forms of ericaceae dominate the landscape.

Grouse, hare, fox, and the occasional wolverine and moose are found. Filefjell also has numerous wild reindeer. In the 1990s, someone attempted to start reindeer herding in Filefjell, but the project was later abandoned. Some of the reindeer herd, which was moved down from Trøndelag, was left to mix with the native reindeer. The lakes are populated by trout.

== History ==
People have used Filefjell since the Stone Age. Reindeer hunters dug systems of pits to catch their pray and these can still be seen. Arrow heads from the same period have also been found.

Smedalen is the main valley in Filefjell. The name means The Smith Valley and evidence of Iron production in the Iron Age. Burial Mounds from the same period are also found here.

The Filefjell Kongevegen (The Kings Road) is the name of the old trail over Filefjell. Due to the sometimes wet and marshy land in the valley bottom, the old trail runs farther up in the hill than the modern asphalt-road does today, and is still used for hiking. It has its name after king Sverre I of Norway who traveled here with his army. The road got official status as main road in the year 1791.

Maristova (built on Queen Margrete's command around 1390) and Nystuen in what is now Vang Municipality (first mentioned in 1627 but believed to be much older) guesthouses provide for travelers along the road. The hosts of the shelters were compensated by the king to aid travelers and provide shelters for those who used the road. This lasted until 1830.

In Smedalen there has been, and still is, dairy farming in the summer. Goats, cows and sheep are herded in the rich mountain pastures and goat cheese is still sold in some places.

In the middle of Smedalen, at Kyrkjestølen, St. Thomas Church stands. It is believed to have been built on a pagan temple. This site was the meeting place for people from Sogn, Valdres, and Hallingdal, who met to perform midsummer blót and trade. When Christianity came the hov was transformed into a church but the traditions remained mostly unchanged. Little is known of this until the 17th century when the church was upgraded.

People started to believe that the church had healing power, and that sinners had a better chance of getting absolution here. People started to come here in great numbers for the Mass on July 2. But the main attraction was the market, where herring and other sea products were traded for inland products like fur. Horse trading were also part of the market. Drinking, fighting, gambling, rape and murder were not uncommon in these markets. It is said that when the wives packed for their husbands going to the market, they also packed their funeral-shirts. In 1808 the priests were so angry with the ungodly activities that they demanded the church to be torn down and the market was banned. A modern church were built at the site in 1971.

== Tourism ==
Filefjell is nowadays used mostly in recreational activities. Fishing, hunting, hiking and skiing are popular. Many holiday cottages have been built the last 30 years. Several hotels are used by tourists who come to ski in the mountain or in the downhill skiing park.

== See also ==
- Dovre National Park
- Rondane National Park
- Dovrefjell-Sunndalsfjella National Park
- List of national parks of Norway
- Tourism in Norway
- Norwegian Mountain Touring Association
- Peer Gynt
