= Brandbu Municipality =

Former municipality in Oppland, Norway

Brandbu Municipality Brandbu herred
- Former municipality
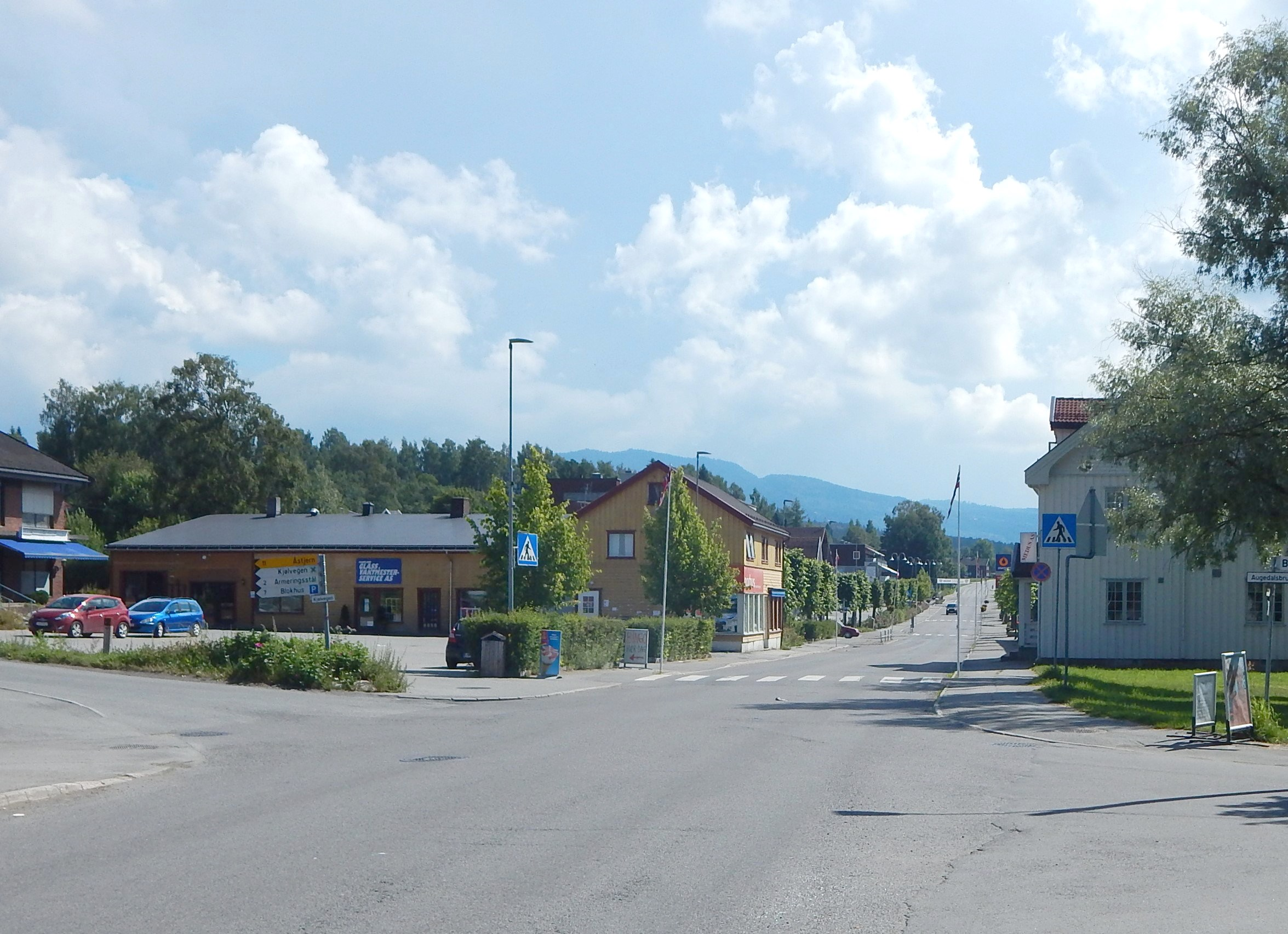
- View of the village of Brandbu

- Oppland within Norway

- Brandbu within Oppland
- Coordinates: 60°25′20″N 10°30′15″E
- Country: Norway
- County: Oppland
- District: Hadeland
- Established: 1 Jan 1897
  - Preceded by: Gran Municipality
- Disestablished: 1 Jan 1962
  - Succeeded by: Gran Municipality
- Administrative centre: Brandbu

Government
  - Mayor (1946–1961): Jens Røisli (Ap)

Area (upon dissolution)
  - Total: 481.7 km^{2} (186.0 sq mi)
  - Rank: #205 in Norway
- Highest elevation: 757 m (2,484 ft)

Population (1961)
  - Total: 6,480
  - Rank: #113 in Norway
  - Density: 13.5/km^{2} (35/sq mi)
  - Change (10 years): ▼ −1.2%
- Demonym: Brandbuing

Official language
  - Norwegian form: Bokmål
- Time zone: UTC+01:00 (CET)
  - Summer (DST): UTC+02:00 (CEST)
- ISO 3166 code: NO-0535

Brandbu is a former municipality in the old Oppland county, Norway. The 481.7-square-kilometre (186.0 sq mi) municipality existed from 1897 until its dissolution in 1962. The area is now part of Gran Municipality in the traditional district of Hadeland. The administrative centre was the village of Brandbu.

Prior to its dissolution in 1962, the 481.7-square-kilometre (186.0 sq mi) municipality was the 205th largest by area out of the 731 municipalities in Norway. Brandbu Municipality was the 113th most populous municipality in Norway with a population of about 6,480. The municipality's population density was 13.5 inhabitants per square kilometre (35/sq mi) and its population had decreased by 1.2% over the previous 10-year period.

== General information ==
The municipality of Brandbu was established on 1 January 1897 when the old Gran Municipality was divided. The northern part (population: 4,719) became Brandbu Municipality and the southern part (population: 3,897) remained as Gran Municipality. During the 1960s, there were many municipal mergers across Norway due to the work of the Schei Committee. On 1 January 1962, Brandbu Municipality (population: 6,477) was merged with most of Gran Municipality (population: 5,249) to form a new, larger Gran Municipality. Two years later, on 1 January 1964, a small part of the old Brandbu (population: 12) located along the south shore of the lake Einavatnet was transferred from Gran Municipality to Vestre Toten Municipality.

=== Name ===
The municipality is named after the old Brandbu farm (Old Norse: Brandabú). The first element of the name comes from the plural genitive case of the word brandr which means "burned" or "fire". The last element is bú which means "house" or "dwelling".

=== Churches ===
The Church of Norway had two parishes (sokn) within Brandbu Municipality. At the time of the municipal dissolution, it was part of the Brandbu prestegjeld and the Hadeland og Land prosti (deanery) in the Diocese of Hamar.

Churches in Brandbu Municipality
| Parish (sokn) | Church name | Location of the church | Year built |
|---|---|---|---|
| Brandbu | Nes Church | Røykenvik | 1730 |
| Brandbu | Sørum Chapel | Bjoneroa | 1861 |
| Tingelstad | Tingelstad Church | Tingelstad | 1866 |
| Tingelstad | Old Tingelstad Church | Tingelstad | c. 1220 |
| Tingelstad | Moen Chapel | Jaren | 1914 |

== Geography ==
The municipality included land on both sides of the large lake Randsfjorden, although most of the municipal residents lived on the east side of the lake. Søndre Land Municipality was located to the north, Eina Municipality was located to the northeast, Hurdal Municipality (in Akershus county) was located to the east, Gran Municipality was located to the south, and Ådal Municipality (in Buskerud county) was located to the west. The highest point in the municipality was the 757-metre (2,484 ft) tall mountain Høgkorset.

== Government ==
While it existed, Brandbu Municipality was responsible for primary education (through 10th grade), outpatient health services, senior citizen services, welfare and other social services, zoning, economic development, and municipal roads and utilities. The municipality was governed by a municipal council of directly elected representatives. The mayor was indirectly elected by a vote of the municipal council. The municipality was under the jurisdiction of the Eidsivating Court of Appeal.

=== Municipal council ===
The municipal council (Herredsstyre) of Brandbu Municipality was made up of 25 representatives that were elected to four-year terms. The tables below show the historical composition of the council by political party.

Brandbu herredsstyre 1959–1961
| Party name (in Norwegian) | Number of representatives |
|---|---|
| Labour Party (Arbeiderpartiet) | 13 |
| Conservative Party (Høyre) | 1 |
| Communist Party (Kommunistiske Parti) | 2 |
| Christian Democratic Party (Kristelig Folkeparti) | 2 |
| Centre Party (Senterpartiet) | 5 |
| Liberal Party (Venstre) | 2 |
| Total number of members: | 25 |
Note: On 1 January 1962, Brandbu Municipality became part of Gran Municipality.

Brandbu herredsstyre 1955–1959
| Party name (in Norwegian) | Number of representatives |
|---|---|
| Labour Party (Arbeiderpartiet) | 11 |
| Conservative Party (Høyre) | 2 |
| Communist Party (Kommunistiske Parti) | 3 |
| Christian Democratic Party (Kristelig Folkeparti) | 2 |
| Farmers' Party (Bondepartiet) | 5 |
| Liberal Party (Venstre) | 2 |
| Total number of members: | 25 |

Brandbu herredsstyre 1951–1955
| Party name (in Norwegian) | Number of representatives |
|---|---|
| Labour Party (Arbeiderpartiet) | 12 |
| Communist Party (Kommunistiske Parti) | 3 |
| Christian Democratic Party (Kristelig Folkeparti) | 2 |
| Farmers' Party (Bondepartiet) | 7 |
| Total number of members: | 24 |

Brandbu herredsstyre 1947–1951
| Party name (in Norwegian) | Number of representatives |
|---|---|
| Labour Party (Arbeiderpartiet) | 10 |
| Communist Party (Kommunistiske Parti) | 4 |
| Christian Democratic Party (Kristelig Folkeparti) | 2 |
| Farmers' Party (Bondepartiet) | 6 |
| Joint list of the Liberal Party (Venstre) and the Radical People's Party (Radikale Folkepartiet) | 2 |
| Total number of members: | 24 |

Brandbu herredsstyre 1945–1947
| Party name (in Norwegian) | Number of representatives |
|---|---|
| Labour Party (Arbeiderpartiet) | 10 |
| Communist Party (Kommunistiske Parti) | 4 |
| Christian Democratic Party (Kristelig Folkeparti) | 2 |
| Farmers' Party (Bondepartiet) | 5 |
| Joint list of the Liberal Party (Venstre) and the Radical People's Party (Radikale Folkepartiet) | 3 |
| Total number of members: | 24 |

Brandbu herredsstyre 1937–1941*
| Party name (in Norwegian) | Number of representatives |
|---|---|
| Labour Party (Arbeiderpartiet) | 13 |
| Farmers' Party (Bondepartiet) | 7 |
| List of workers, fishermen, and small farmholders (Arbeidere, fiskere, småbrukere liste) | 4 |
| Total number of members: | 24 |
Note: Due to the German occupation of Norway during World War II, no elections were held for new municipal councils until after the war ended in 1945.

=== Mayors ===
The mayor (Norwegian: ordfører) of Brandbu Municipality was the political leader of the municipality and the chairperson of the municipal council. The following people have held this position:

- 1897–1899: Ole Hansen Egge (ArbDem)
- 1900–1904: Even Raassum
- 1905–1922: Ole Hansen Egge (ArbDem)
- 1923–1925: Lars Bleken (Bp)
- 1926–1934: Ole Hansen Egge (ArbDem)
- 1935–1940: Thorvald Ulsnæs (Ap)
- 1940–1945: Ingolf Drøvdal (NS)
- 1945–1945: Thorvald Ulsnæs (Ap)
- 1946–1961: Jens Røisli (Ap)

== See also ==
- List of former municipalities of Norway
