= Tangen–Horn ferry =

Ferry route in Innlandet, Norway

Coordinates: 60°30′46″N 10°20′11″E

The Tangen–Horn Ferry is an automobile ferry in Gran Municipality in Innlandet county, Norway. It operates on the lake Randsfjorden, connecting Bjoneroa in the west with Brandbu and Søndre Land Municipality in the east.
