= Engnæs Træsliperi =

Norwegian wood pulp company

- Type: Aksjeselskap
- Industry: Wood pulp
- Founded: 1894
- Defunct: 1914
- Fate: Closed in favor of power production
- Headquarters: Brandbu, Gran, Oppland, Norway
- Products: Wood pulp

Engnæs Træsliperi was an industrial company that produced wood pulp in Gran on Hadeland. The company was established in 1894, the factory was put into operation in 1895, and it closed in 1914.

== History ==
Entrepreneurial activity in pulp production was almost exceptional when the Hadeland men Steffen Engnæs, Guthorm Egge, and Hans Lysen took the initiative to establish a wood-grinding mill in western Brandbu in 1894. Engnæs was founded during a period of decline for the pulp industry, while cellulose and paper were on the rise. Price pressure and a weak market led many owners to sell their grinding mills to foreign buyers. The new mill at Kvernselva was nonetheless built, and one explanation for this optimistic venture in a time of decline was capital and felling rights, both of which the forest speculator and timber trader Steffen Engnæs had access to.

The company was built with a capacity of 2,500 tonnes of wood pulp and employed 12 people in its first years. Several of the workers lived in apartments the company set up, and electric lighting was installed in the factory.

At first, timber and pulp were transported by horse. In winter the finished pulp was driven on sledges over the ice of Randsfjorden to Røykenvik and then carried onward by rail. Shipping improved considerably when the company ordered a steamship in 1906, completed in 1907, with a capacity of 40 tonnes; it was used to carry pulp from the factory and timber to it.

The pulp was produced from spruce, the dominant raw material for the wood-processing industry in the Drammen watercourse, and was largely exported to England and Germany for further processing. The village book for Hadeland states that the company received medals for its pulp at exhibitions in Stockholm and Paris, so it was probably a sought-after product for British and German paper manufacturers.

Many of the key factors behind the establishment of wood-grinding mills in Norway in the second half of the 19th century were thus in place when Engnæs, Egge, and Lysen took the initiative in western Brandbu in 1894: the availability of raw materials, the markets in Great Britain and Germany, capital, waterpower, and eager entrepreneurs with faith in their own enterprise.

== Conversion to power generation ==
Through the 20th century, many closed wood-processing companies were taken over by local electricity utilities, and there was a general view in the industry that switching from pulp production to power production was profitable. Low timber prices in countries such as Sweden, Canada, and Finland created sales problems for the Norwegian mills. Demand for timber in Norway was high, so timber prices stayed high; the value of Norwegian wood fell while the waterfalls on which the mills were built grew steadily more valuable through the century. Writing about the conversion to power production in 1916, Papir-Journalen welcomed the change, noting that given the difficult conditions then facing the mills, such a large-scale conversion would help avert economic collapse.

Engnæs was among the companies that closed in favor of power production. When the business was closed at the turn of the year 1913–1914, the management of Hadelands Elektrisitetsverk saw opportunities in the Kvernselva waterfall and built an electricity plant. Many of those who had worked at the mill followed to the electricity plant. The wood-processing business was never resumed.

== Bibliography ==
- Gogstad, Inger (2002). «Steffen Engnæs og A/S Engnæs Træsliberi i Vestre Brandbu». Årbok for Hadeland. Brandbu.
- Hadeland bygdebok, vol. 2. Oslo, 1932, pp. 182, 183.
- Lange, Even; Hansen, Svein Olav (2001). «Skogen og det industrielle eventyr». In Tid for skog. Norsk Skogbruksmuseum Årbok no. 15. Elverum.
- «Fra sagbruk til kraftstasjon», unsigned article in Papir-Journalen no. 3, 1916, pp. 28–29.
