= Ivar Hvamstad =

Norwegian politician

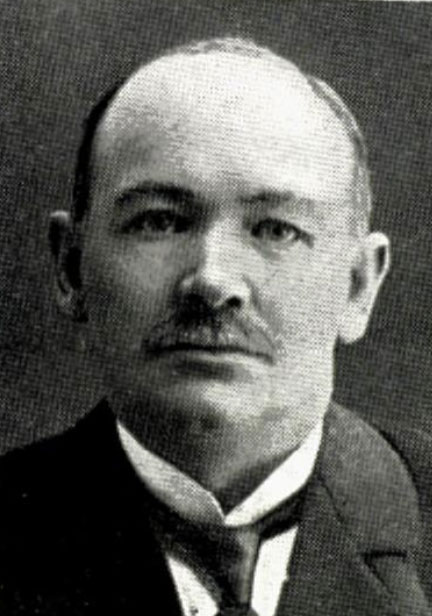
Portrait of Ivar Hvamstad

Ivar Hvamstad (28 September 1878 – 9 May 1916) was a Norwegian politician for the Labour Party.

He was born at Hilden in Thingelstad, Brandbu as a son of teacher and farmer Iver Larsen Hvamstad (1843–1903) and Marthe Pedersdatter Alm (1846–1928). After finishing primary school he attended school in Gran. He was a trade clerk in Drøbak and Nes i Romerike, and started his own store in 1898. He ran a store in Hof i Solør until 1911, then in Brandval.

He was a member of the municipal council for Hof Municipality from 1907 to 1910, and also the school board. He chaired the constituency branch of the Labour Party in Solør. In the 1915 parliamentary election he was fielded as Labour's candidate, and with 3,679 votes he edged out the closest challenger, Liberal Per Aasness with a wide margin. Hvamstad assumed his parliamentary seat in early 1916, but died in May 1916. He was replaced by his deputy Halvdan Aarsrud.
