= Lushaugen =

Mountain in Innlandet, Norway

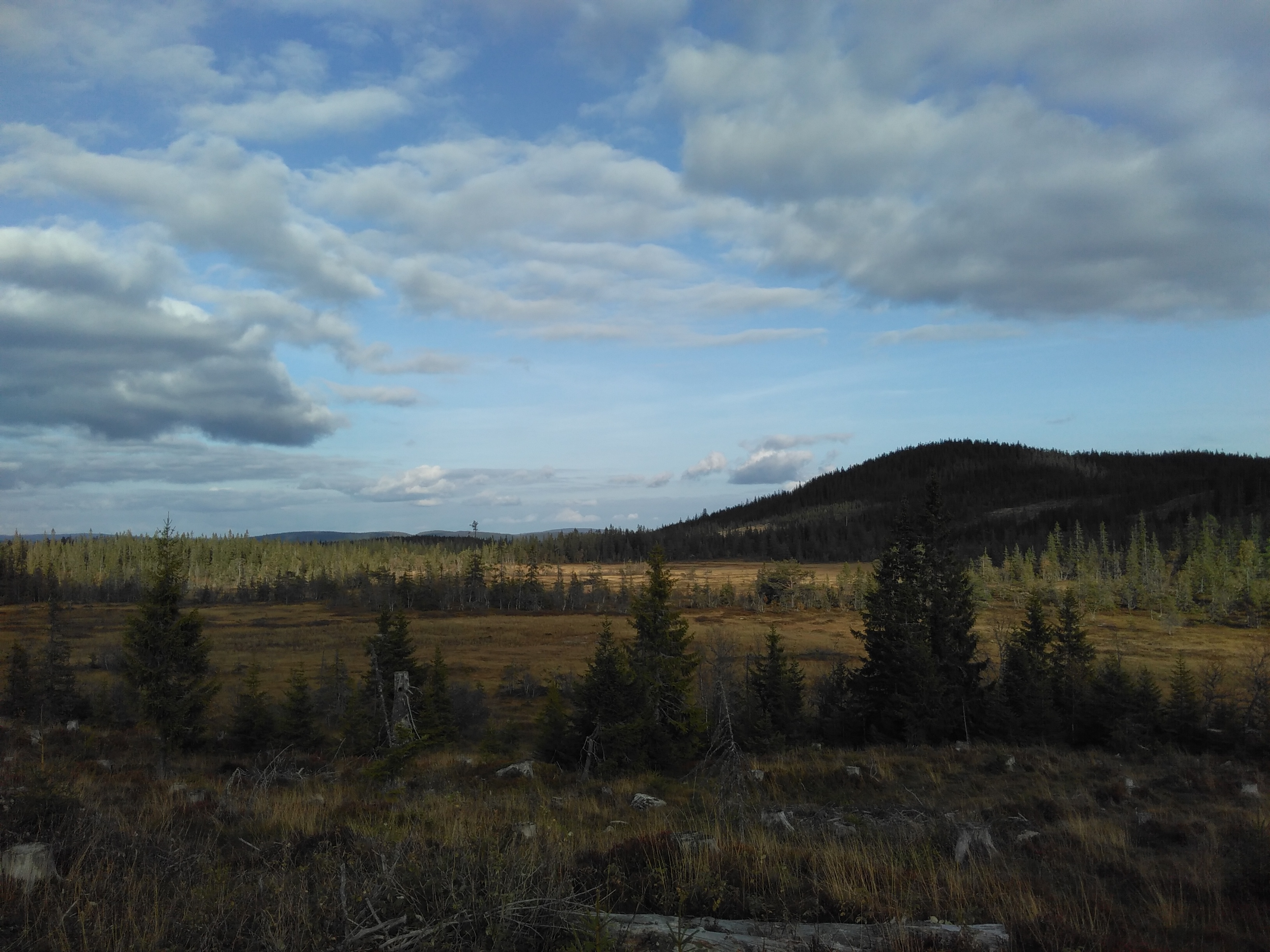

Highest point
- Elevation: 812 m (2,664 ft)
- Prominence: 300 m (980 ft)
- Parent peak: Bjørnåsen
- Isolation: 13.5 km (8.4 mi)
- Coordinates: 60°25′51″N 10°41′14″E

Geography
- Interactive map of the mountain
- Location: Innlandet-Akershus, Norway

Lushaugen is a mountain in southern Norway. It is located on the border of Gran Municipality in Innlandet county and Hurdal Municipality in Akershus county. The 812-metre (2,664 ft) tall mountain is located about 7 kilometres (4.3 mi) northeast of the village of Jaren and about the same distance to the east of the village of Brandbu. Norwegian National Road 4 is a north–south highway that passes a short distance to the west of the mountain.

== See also ==
- List of mountains of Norway by height
