= Egge, Innlandet =

Village in Gran Municipality, Norway

Egge
- Village
- Interactive map of Egge
- Location within Innlandet Location within Norway
- Coordinates: 60.43755°N 10.49485°E
- Country: Norway
- Region: Eastern Norway
- County: Innlandet
- District: Hadeland
- Municipality: Gran Municipality
- Elevation: 318 m (1,043 ft)
- Time zone: UTC+01:00 (CET)
  - Summer (DST): UTC+02:00 (CEST)
- Post Code: 2760 Brandbu

Egge is a village in Gran Municipality in Innlandet county, Norway. The village is located about 2 kilometres (1.2 mi) to the northwest of the village of Brandbu. The lake Randsfjorden and the Nes Church are both about 2 kilometres (1.2 mi) to the east of Egge.
