= Iver Larsen Hvamstad =

Norwegian politician

Ivar Larsen Hvamstad (14 December 1843 – 5 October 1903) was a Norwegian educator and politician for the Liberal Party.

He was elected to the Parliament of Norway from the constituency Christians Amt in 1879 and 1882. He served through 1885, representing the Liberal Party from its foundation in 1884. He was a teacher in Gran Municipality and farmer in Brandbu, and was the mayor of Brandbu Municipality for several years.

Together with Marthe Pedersdatter Alm (1846–1928) he had the son Ivar Hvamstad, who became a member of Parliament in 1916.
