= Ringstad, Innlandet =

Village in Gran Municipality, Norway

Ringstad
- Village
- Interactive map of Ringstad
- Location within Innlandet Location within Norway
- Coordinates: 60.36716°N 10.58952°E
- Country: Norway
- Region: Eastern Norway
- County: Innlandet
- District: Hadeland
- Municipality: Gran Municipality

Area
  - Total: 1.45 km^{2} (0.56 sq mi)
- Elevation: 294 m (965 ft)

Population (2024)
  - Total: 1,698
  - Density: 1,171/km^{2} (3,030/sq mi)
- Time zone: UTC+01:00 (CET)
  - Summer (DST): UTC+02:00 (CEST)
- Post Code: 2750 Gran

Ringstad is a village in Gran Municipality in Innlandet county, Norway. The village is located about 1.2 kilometres (0.75 mi) to the northeast of the village of Gran. The villages of Jaren and Brandbu are located about 4 kilometres (2.5 mi) to the northwest of Ringstad.

Ringstad and its neighboring village of Gran have grown together through conurbation and Statistics Norway has considered them as one, single urban settlement for many years. The 1.45-square-kilometre (360-acre) village of Gran/Ringstad has a population (2024) of 1,698 and a population density of 1,171 inhabitants per square kilometre (3,030/sq mi).
