= Gran (village) =

Village in Gran Municipality, Norway

- Village
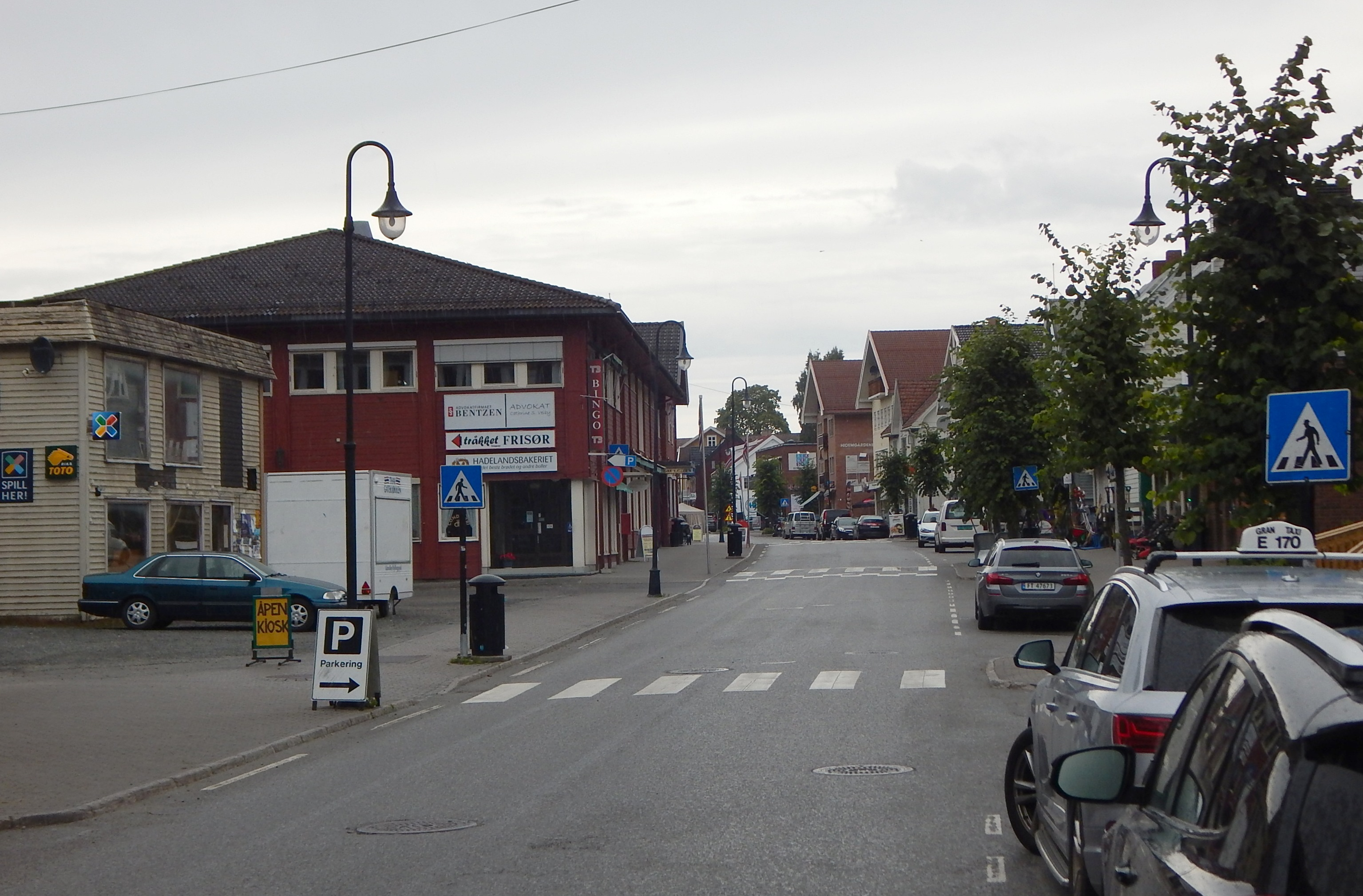
- View of the village
- Interactive map of Gran
- Location within Innlandet Location within Norway
- Coordinates: 60.35916°N 10.57282°E
- Country: Norway
- Region: Eastern Norway
- County: Innlandet
- District: Hadeland
- Municipality: Gran Municipality

Area
  - Total: 1.45 km^{2} (0.56 sq mi)
- Elevation: 213 m (699 ft)

Population (2024)
  - Total: 1,698
  - Density: 1,171/km^{2} (3,030/sq mi)
- Time zone: UTC+01:00 (CET)
  - Summer (DST): UTC+02:00 (CEST)
- Post Code: 2750 Gran

Gran is a village in Gran Municipality in Innlandet county, Norway. The village is located about 50 kilometres (31 mi) to the north of the capital city of Oslo. The small village of Ringstad lies about 1.2 kilometres (0.75 mi) to the northeast and the villages of Jaren and Brandbu lie about 5 kilometres (3.1 mi) to the northwest.

Gran and its neighboring village of Ringstad have grown together through conurbation and Statistics Norway has considered them as one, single urban settlement for many years. The 1.45-square-kilometre (360-acre) village of Gran/Ringstad has a population (2024) of 1,698 and a population density of 1,171 inhabitants per square kilometre (3,030/sq mi).

The Norwegian National Road 4 and the Gjøvikbanen railway line both run through the village. Ål Church is located in the village.
