= Torstein Seiersten =

Norwegian speed skater (1931–2023)

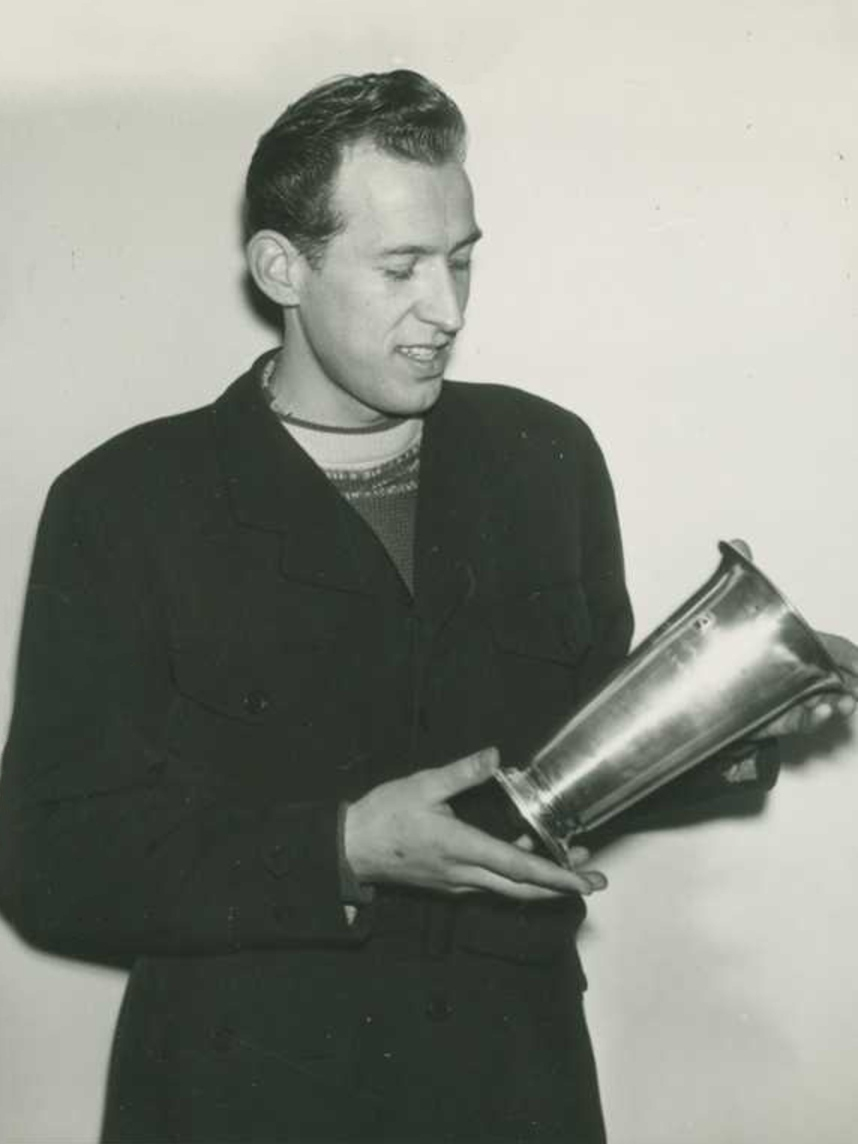
- Seiersten in the 1950s

Personal information
- Born: 22 February 1931 Brandbu, Norway
- Died: 15 October 2023 (aged 92) Nittedal, Norway

Sport
- Sport: Speed skating
- Club: Brandbu IF

Olav Torstein Seiersten (22 February 1931 – 15 October 2023) was a Norwegian speed skater.

Seiersten represented Norway in two Winter Olympics, in World Allround Speed Skating Championships for Men, and in European championships. His achievements include a fourth place on 5,000 metres at the 1960 Winter Olympics, and a victory on 10,000 metres at the 1956 world championships.

== Personal life ==
Olav Torstein Seiersten was born on 22 February 1931 in Brandbu Municipality (now part of Gran Municipality) in Norway.

Outside sports, he was assigned with the Norwegian State Railways.

Seiersten died in Nittedal Municipality on 15 October 2023, at the age of 92.

== Sports career ==
As a speed skater, Seiersten performed best on the long distances. He represented the club Brandbi IF. He won the 10,000 metres event at the 1956 World Allround Championships, and placed fourth overall in the championship. He placed 10th in the 5,000 metres at the 1956 Winter Olympics.

In 1957 he placed fifth overall in the world championships. In 1958 he finished fifth overall in the European championships, and in 1959 he finished sixth overall in the world championships.

At the 1960 Winter Olympics, he finished 4th in the 5,000 metres and 6th in the 10,000 metres.
