= Kristian Horn =

Norwegian botanist and humanist

Kristian Horn (12 May 1903 – 28 April 1981) was a Norwegian botanist and humanist.

== Biography ==
He was born in Brandbu as a son of store owner Martinius Horn (1887–1956) and Gina Kristoffersen (1875–1931). In 1932 he married Ester Jynge, a daughter of railway director Andreas Grimelund Jynge. Their son Per Kristian Horn became a scenographer, and was formerly married to Ellen Horn. Kristian Horn is also a grandfather of Anders Horn.

He finished secondary school at Hegdehaugen School in 1922. After lengthy studies he graduated from the Royal Frederick University with the cand.real. degree in 1937. He had among others studied abroad and been a research assistant at the University Botanical Garden from 1929. His main interests were genetics, cytology and evolutionary theory.

In 1947 he was promoted to associate professor. He was also a science lecturer at Oslo Public Teachers' College from 1945. However, he is mainly remembered as co-founder of the Norwegian Humanist Association, the Norwegian body of the International Humanist and Ethical Union, in 1956. He served as its first chairman, having previously chaired Foreningen for borgerlig konfirmasjon from 1950 to 1957.

Horn was also a violinist, and chair of the Students' Orchestra from 1945 to 1953. He resided in Bærum, where he died in April 1981.
