= Sverre Fredheim =

American ski jumper

Personal information
- Nationality: American
- Born: December 10, 1907 Gran Municipality, Norway
- Died: April 9, 1981 (aged 73)

Sport
- Sport: Skiing

Sverre Fredheim (December 10, 1907 – April 9, 1981) was an American Olympic skier.

Fredheim was born in Gran Municipality in Kristians county, Norway. He emigrated to the United States during 1927. He joined the St. Paul Ski Club and became a US citizen in 1935. He competed in ski jumping at the 1936 Winter Olympics in Garmisch-Partenkirchen, and at the 1948 Winter Olympics in St. Moritz, where he placed sixth in ski jumping.

In 1951, he placed ninth place in the Olympic tryouts at Iron Mountain, Michigan. In 1955, he began competing in Veteran’s meets. Fredheim was elected to the National Ski Hall of Fame in 1973.
