= Andreas Jynge =

Norwegian civil servant and writer

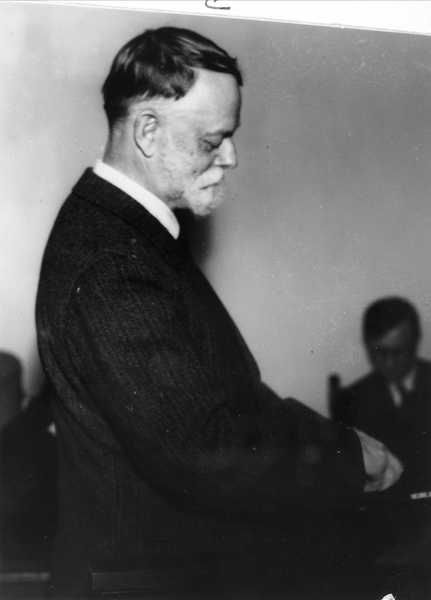
Andreas Jynge, c. 1930

Andreas Grimelund Jynge (3 September 1870 – 13 June 1955) was a Norwegian civil servant and writer.

He was born in Skien. He was hired as secretary in the Norwegian Ministry of Labour in 1898, and was promoted to head of his department in 1912. From 1919 to 1937 he was a director in the Norwegian State Railways.

He was also a poet; his most important poetry collections were the 1896 Viser og vers and the 1903 Egne veie. He was also a theatre and literary critic in various newspapers.

He was the father of Gert Jynge, and his daughter Ester Jr. (1902–1993) married Kristian Horn. He was also a maternal grandson of Andreas Grimelund.
