= Anders Horn =

Norwegian journalist and editor (born 1971)

Anders Horn (born 12 April 1971) is a Norwegian journalist and editor.

He was a journalist in Ny Tid from 1997 to 2001 and editor-in-chief from 2001 to 2005. He was then hired as a journalist in Klassekampen, and was promoted to political editor in 2008. In 2010 he became a communications adviser in the Norwegian Confederation of Trade Unions.

He hails from Stabekk and is a grandson of Kristian Horn.
