= Per Aasness =

Norwegian military officer and politician

Per Aasness (26 July 1875 – 1959) was a Norwegian military officer and politician for the Liberal Party.

He was born at Flaen in Hurdal as a son of farmer and forest owner Carelius Pedersen Aasness (1842–1907) and Johanne Amalie Simensen (1838–1920). He took commerce school and then petty officer's school at Oscarsborg Fortress in 1896. He took over the family farm Søndre Åsnes in Åsnes in 1905, and in 1930 he was hired as district manager for Glommens Tømmermåling, with residence in Skarnes. He had previously been a supervisory council member of Glommens Tømmermåling from 1918 to 1923, and then board member. In the military he advanced in the ranks via sergeant in 1897, furer in 1902, commander sergeant in 1903, stykkjunker (Fahnenjunker in the artillery) in 1912 and finally captain in the artillery from 1930 to 1935. He was a leader and from 1938 an honorary member of his local union, Oscarsborg Befalslag; and was the deputy chair of the nationwide union Norges Befalslag for two years.

He is listed as having had "almost all municipal posts" in Åsnes, and was a member of the municipal council from 1904 to 1922. He served the last three years as mayor. He fielded as the Liberal Party candidate in several parliamentary elections, the first time in 1915. He then lost to Labour's Ivar Hvamstad with 1,898 to 3,679 votes, although Aasness edged out the Conservative candidate R. Jahr who tallied 1,385 votes. In 1918, he ran against the former deputy of the now-deceased Hvamstad, Halvdan Aarsrud. Aarsrud prevailed with 3,952 votes against 1,637 for Aasness and 1,623 for Agrarian T. Gjølstad. By 1921, however, plural-member constituencies had been instituted and Aasness was nominated as the Liberal ballot's second candidate in Hedmark, only behind MP Johannes Johnsen Grue. Grue was elected, and Aasness served as his deputy. Aasness most significantly met in Parliament during 1923. In 1924 Grue was nominated for re-election, heading the ballot ahead of Thore Myrvang and Aasness, but the ballot did not prevail this time.

From 1923 to 1930 Aasness was a member of the county tax board in Hedmark and the supervisory committee for the Trunk Line, the Kongsvinger Line and the Solør Line. He was engaged in local sports, and was also the manager of the deaneries of Solør. In 1942, during the occupation of Norway by Nazi Germany, he was relieved of this position by the Nazi authorities. He had fought in the Norwegian Campaign battles in Hedmark, and was viewed with constant suspicion. He was arrested in 1942 and interrogated twice at Victoria Terrasse. He died in 1959.
