= Kirsten Langbo =

Norwegian children's writer (1909–1996)

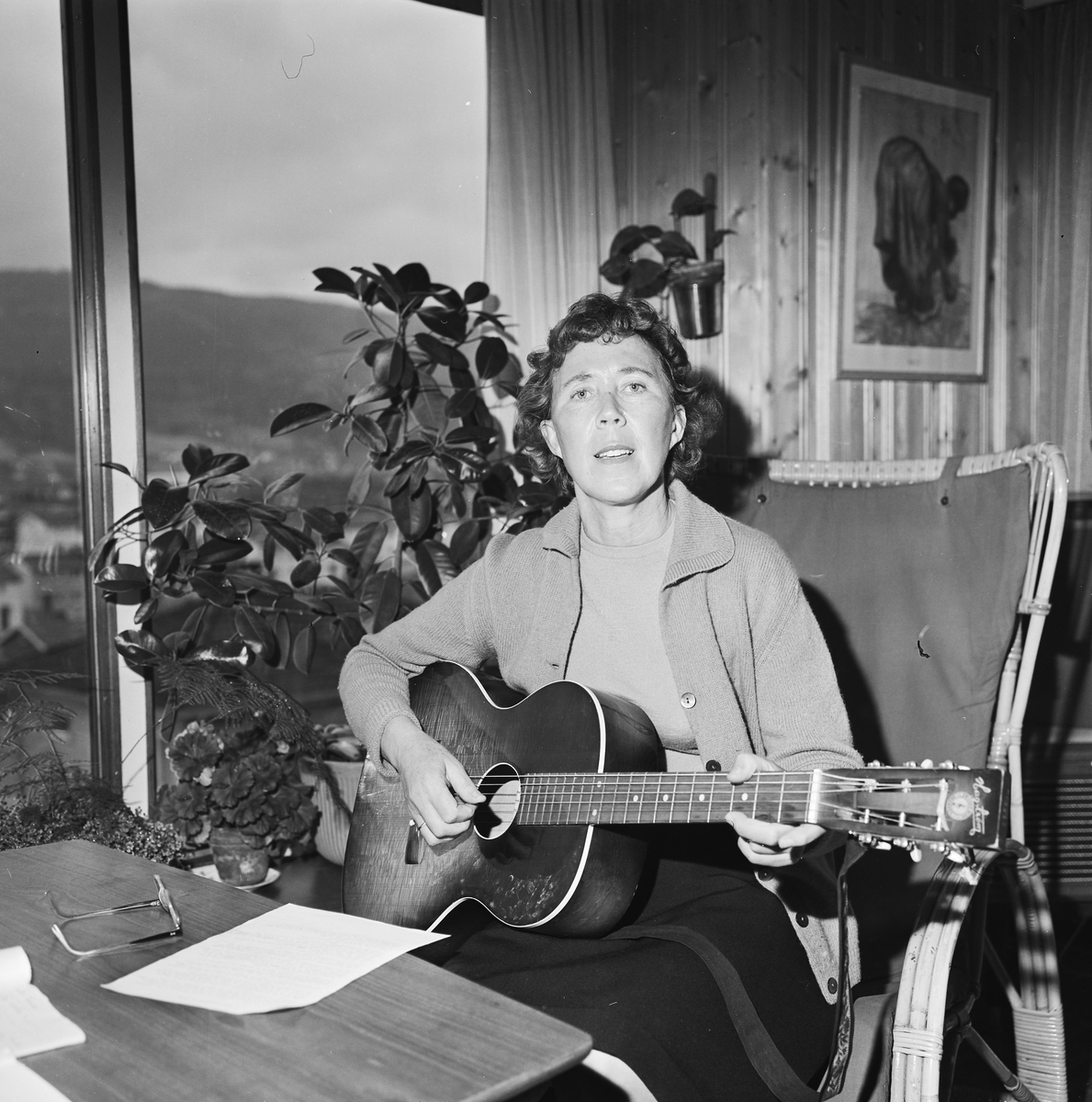
- Kirsten Langbo in 1964
- Born: 13 September 1909; Gran Municipality, Norway
- Died: 18 January 1996 (aged 86); Gran
- Occupations: children's writer, songwriter and entertainer
- Awards: Språklig samlings litteraturpris Hadelandsprisen

Kirsten Langbo (13 September 1909 – 18 January 1996) was a Norwegian children's writer, singer-songwriter and entertainer.

== Personal life ==
She was born in Gran Municipality to farmer Iver Paulsen Jorstad and Dagny Franziska Aleksandra Pedersen, and grew up in a family with thirteen siblings. She moved to Vancouver, Canada, where she married papermaster Georg Gulbrandsen Langbo around 1930, and the couple eventually settled in Drammen.

== Career ==
After having raised her own children, Langbo started writing humorous articles for the newspaper Drammens Tidende. Appearing in the children's radio show Barnetimen for de minste from the mid 1950s, she performed her own songs and told stories from her rural childhood. Her signature tune was a vocal imitation of a trombone solo (a version of "Bavarian polka" played with her lips). She also appeared in television shows for NRK, as ventriloquist with hand puppets. She made her literary debut in 1957 with the anthology Morn igjen. Further the children's books Berte fra Barnetimen (1958), Mirisak (1967), Pappa Tusenbein (1969), and Ola på Rundtomgard (1977). A second version of Berte fra barnetimen was issued as Barna på Mikkelsplassen in 1977, illustrated by Borghild Rud. In 1978 she wrote the memoir book Heme hos oss. Langbo became a popular entertainer, and toured in Norway with her puppet shows and songs. More than eighty songs by her are registered. Her first record, an EP from 1956, contained the songs "Jenta som ikke ville ha mat", "Mamma-e-a-e-a", "Loftsmusene", and "Musene leker gjemsel". She issued the EP Berte fra Barnetimen in 1960, and cooperated with Alf Prøysen, Kjell Lund and Ingebrigt Davik on the EP Trafikk-ABC in 1961. She published the album Barnetime for store og små in 1972, and participated with other artists on the albums Jul for hele familien (1978) and Barnas Store Ønskeplate (1979).

She was awarded the Språklig samlings litteraturpris and Hadelandsprisen. She died in Gran on 18 January 1996, aged 86.
