= Jaren =

Village in Gran Municipality, Norway

- Village
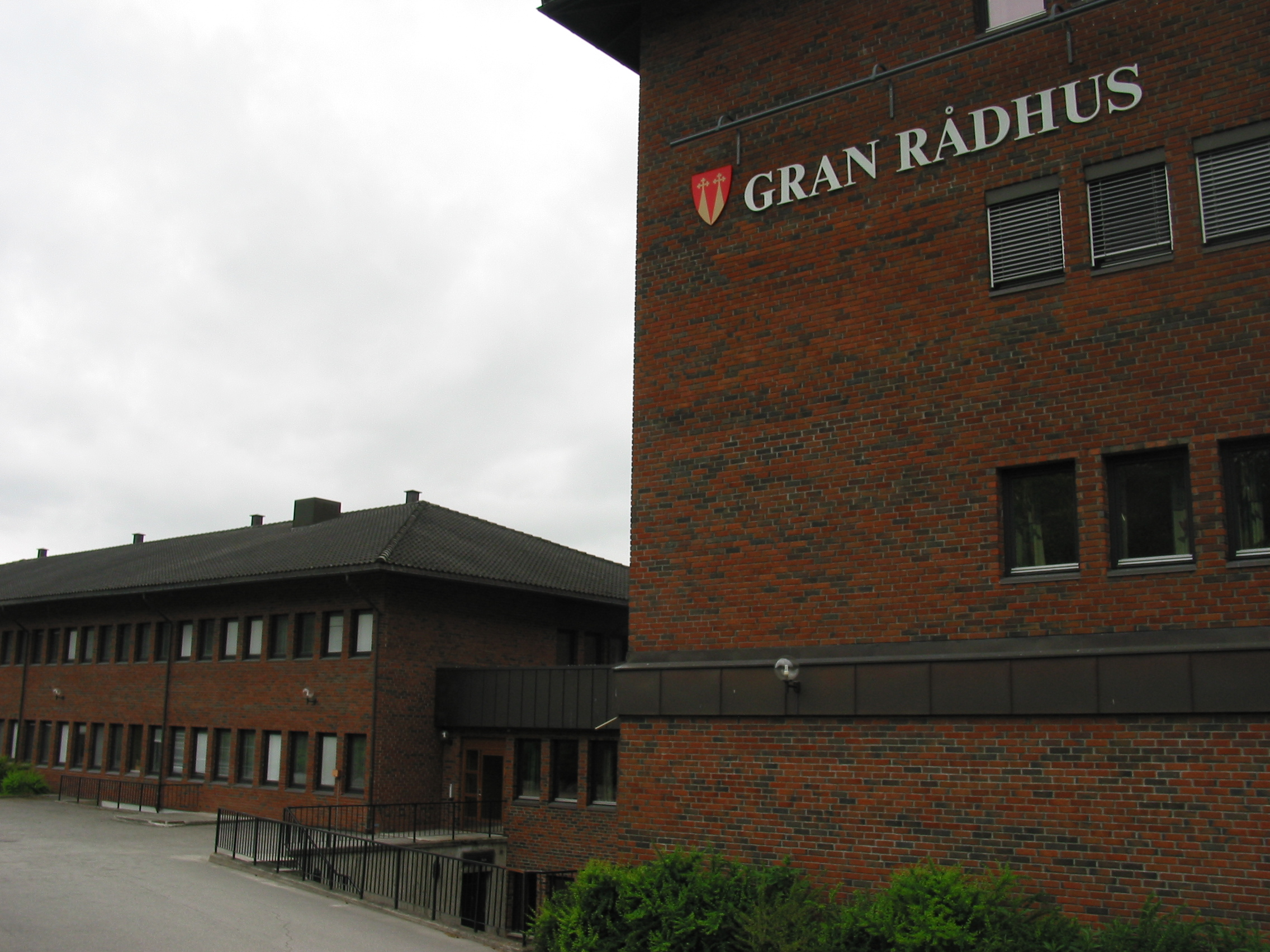
- View of the municipal building in Jaren
- Interactive map of Jaren
- Location within Innlandet Location within Norway
- Coordinates: 60.39257°N 10.56176°E
- Country: Norway
- Region: Eastern Norway
- County: Innlandet
- District: Hadeland
- Municipality: Gran Municipality

Area
  - Total: 5.7 km^{2} (2.2 sq mi)
- Elevation: 225 m (738 ft)

Population (2024)
  - Total: 5,148
  - Density: 903/km^{2} (2,340/sq mi)
- Time zone: UTC+01:00 (CET)
  - Summer (DST): UTC+02:00 (CEST)
- Post Code: 2770 Jaren

Jaren is the administrative centre of Gran Municipality in Innlandet county, Norway. The village is located about 55 kilometres (34 mi) northwest of Oslo, the capital city. The lake Randsfjorden (Norway's fourth largest lake) lies about 7 kilometres (4.3 mi) west of Jaren. The village of Brandbu lies about 3 kilometres (1.9 mi) to the northwest, while the villages of Ringstad and Gran lie about 4 kilometres (2.5 mi) to the southeast.

Jaren and its neighboring village of Brandbu have grown together through conurbation, and Statistics Norway has considered them as one, single urban settlement for many years. The 5.7-square-kilometre (1,400-acre) village of Brandbu/Jaren has a population (2024) of 5,148 and a population density of 903 inhabitants per square kilometre (2,340/sq mi).

The Norwegian National Road 4 and the Gjøvikbanen railway line both run through the village, with trains stopping at Jaren Station. Moen Church lies in the northern part of Jaren.

Jaren is the municipality's industrial center. The cornerstone company, Hapro, produces industrial electronics. Jaren also has an aluminum goods factory, a quarry, and a grain silo. The Hadeland energy plant is located at Jaren. The Hadeland Folkemuseum is located just west of Jaren and includes the Old Tingelstad Church, built in Romanesque style during the Middle Ages, which still retains a well-preserved Renaissance interior.
