= Moen Church =

Church in Innlandet, Norway

- Moen kirke
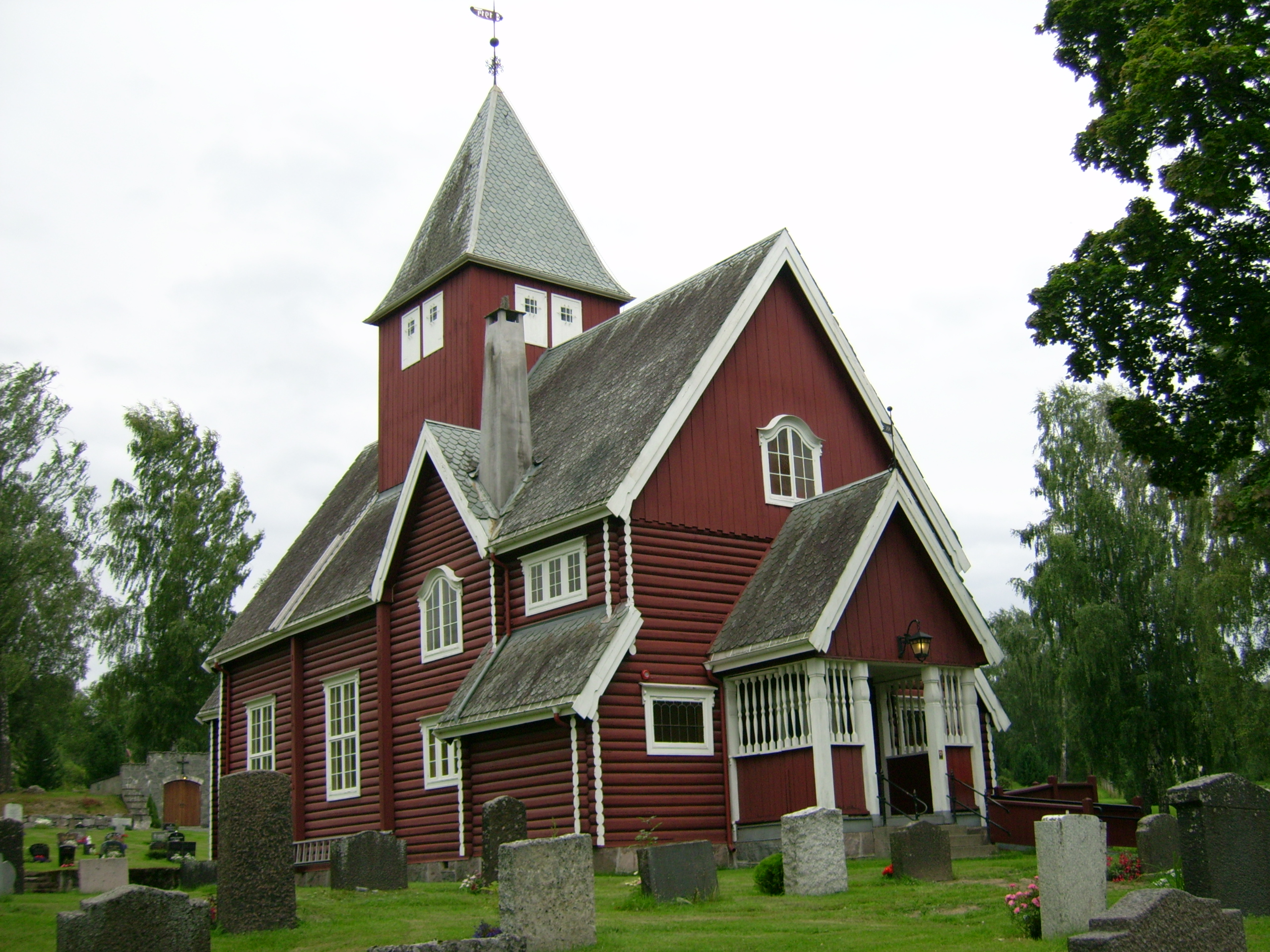
- View of the church
- Moen Church
- 60°24′55″N 10°32′42″E
- Location: Gran Municipality, Innlandet
- Country: Norway
- Denomination: Church of Norway
- Churchmanship: Evangelical Lutheran

History
- Status: Parish church
- Founded: 1914
- Consecrated: 18 June 1914

Architecture
- Functional status: Active
- Architect: Harald Aars
- Architectural type: Long church
- Style: National Romantic style
- Completed: 1914 (112 years ago)

Specifications
- Capacity: 170
- Materials: Wood

Administration
- Diocese: Hamar bispedømme
- Deanery: Hadeland og Land prosti
- Parish: Moen/Ål
- Norwegian Cultural Heritage Site
- Type: Church
- Status: Protected
- ID: 84970

Moen Church (Norwegian: Moen kirke) is a parish church of the Church of Norway in Gran Municipality in Innlandet county, Norway. It is located in the northern part of the village of Jaren. It is one of the churches for the Moen/Ål parish which is part of the Hadeland og Land prosti (deanery) in the Diocese of Hamar. The brown, wooden church was built in a long church design in 1914 using plans drawn up by the architect Harald Aars. The church seats about 170 people.

== History ==
Around 1910, the municipality began planning for a new annex chapel in Jaren. After a public meeting in October 1910, a committee was appointed in the Moen district, which at that time numbered 915 inhabitants. A three-acre plot of land was donated by Kjersti and Johan Trulserud and the people of the Tingelstad area gave timber, and a fundraising campaign was initiated. In 1912, the architect Harald Aars was hired to design the building which was expected to cost about 20,000 kr. The church was designed as a long church in the National Romantic style. The new Moen Chapel was consecrated on 18 June 1914. Around the turn of the 21st century, the chapel was re-titled as a church in a new combined parish with Ål Church.

== Media gallery ==
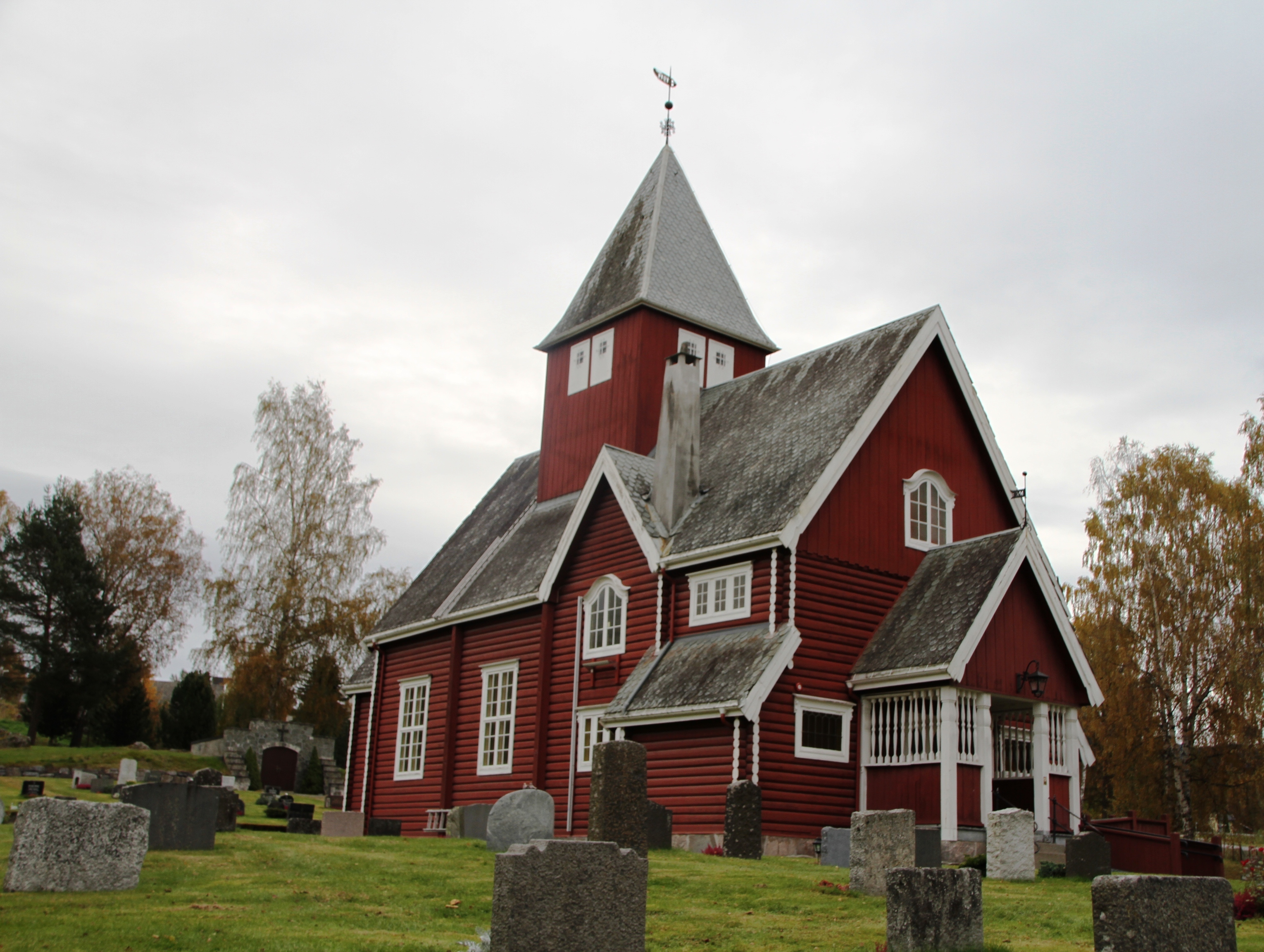

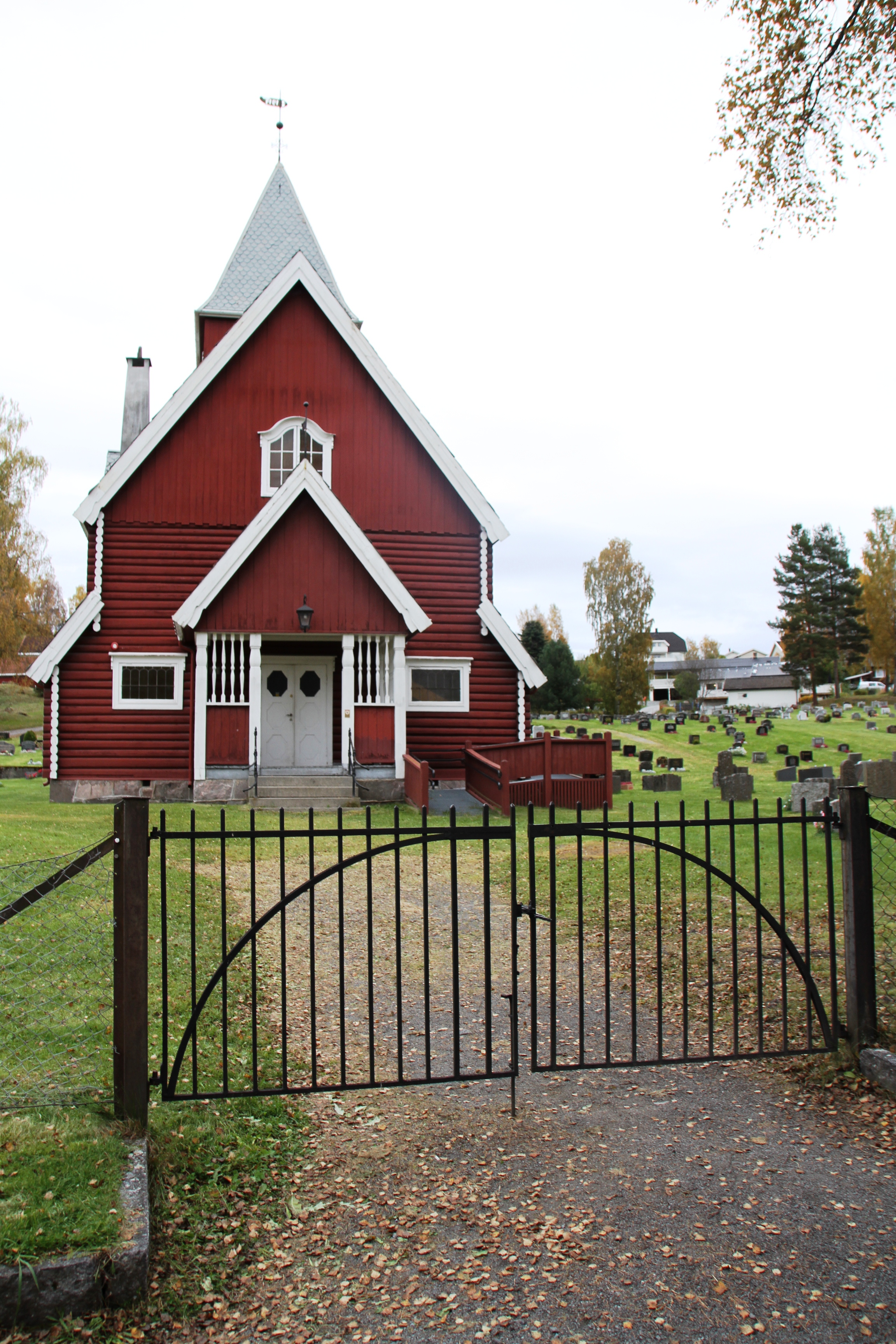

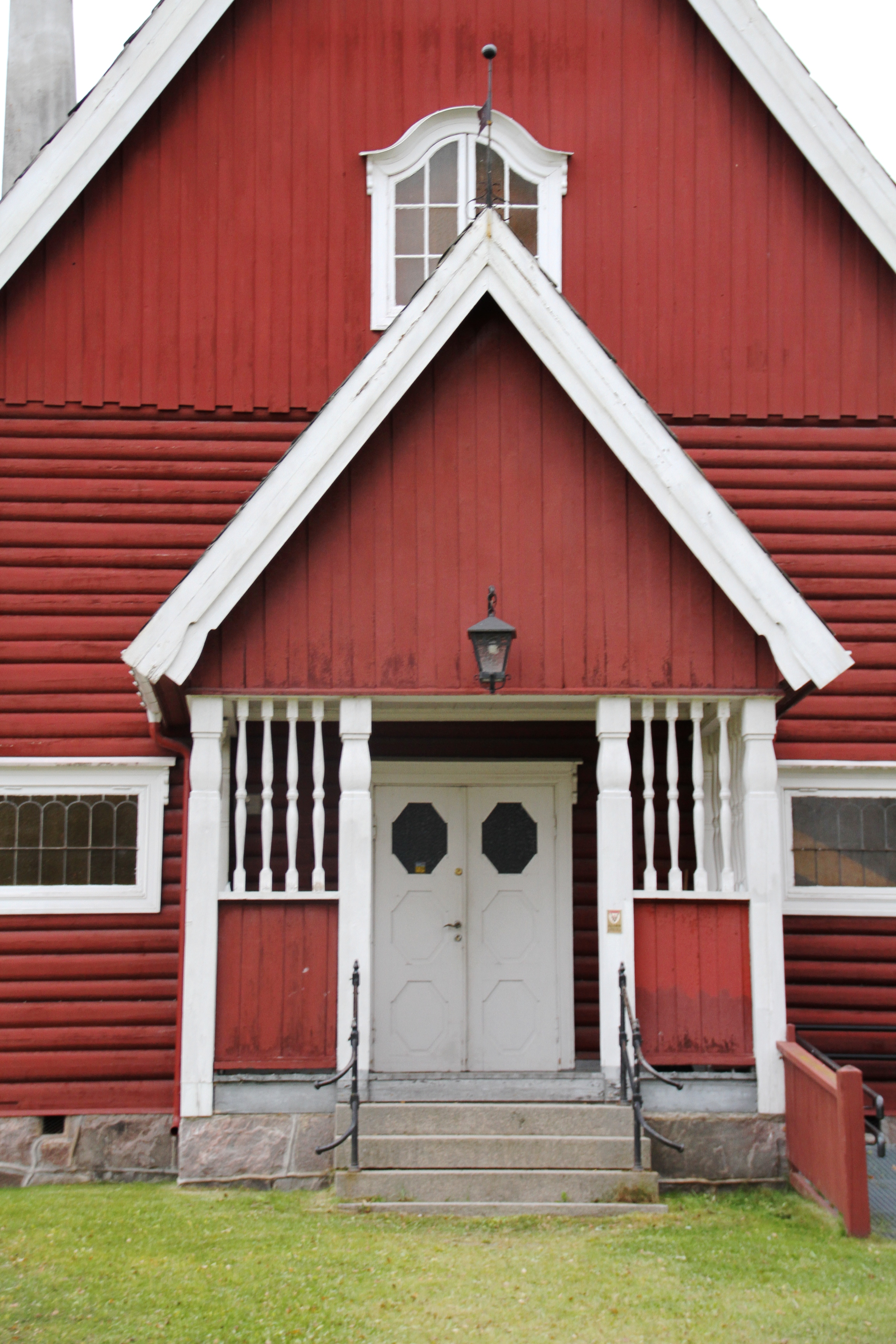

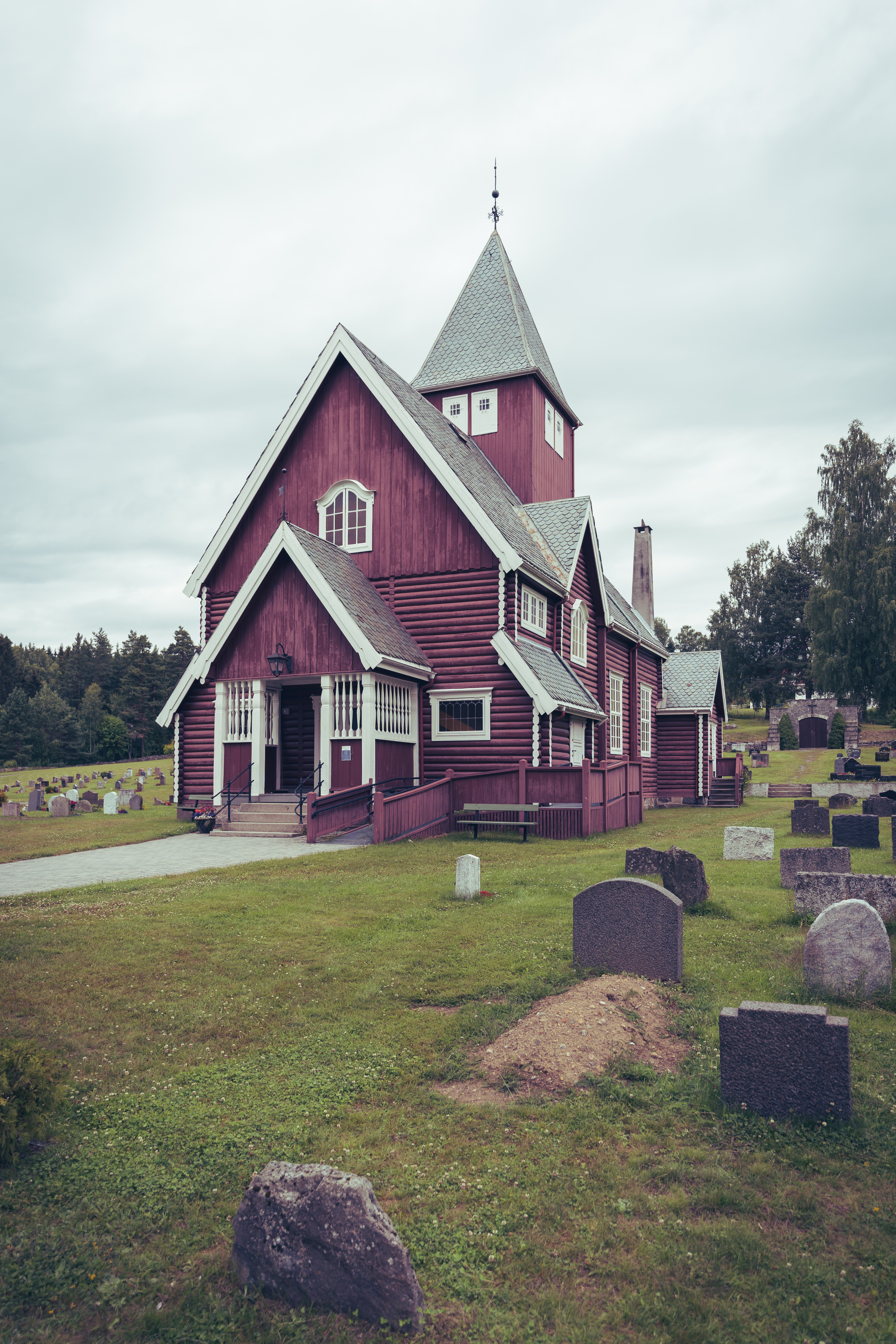

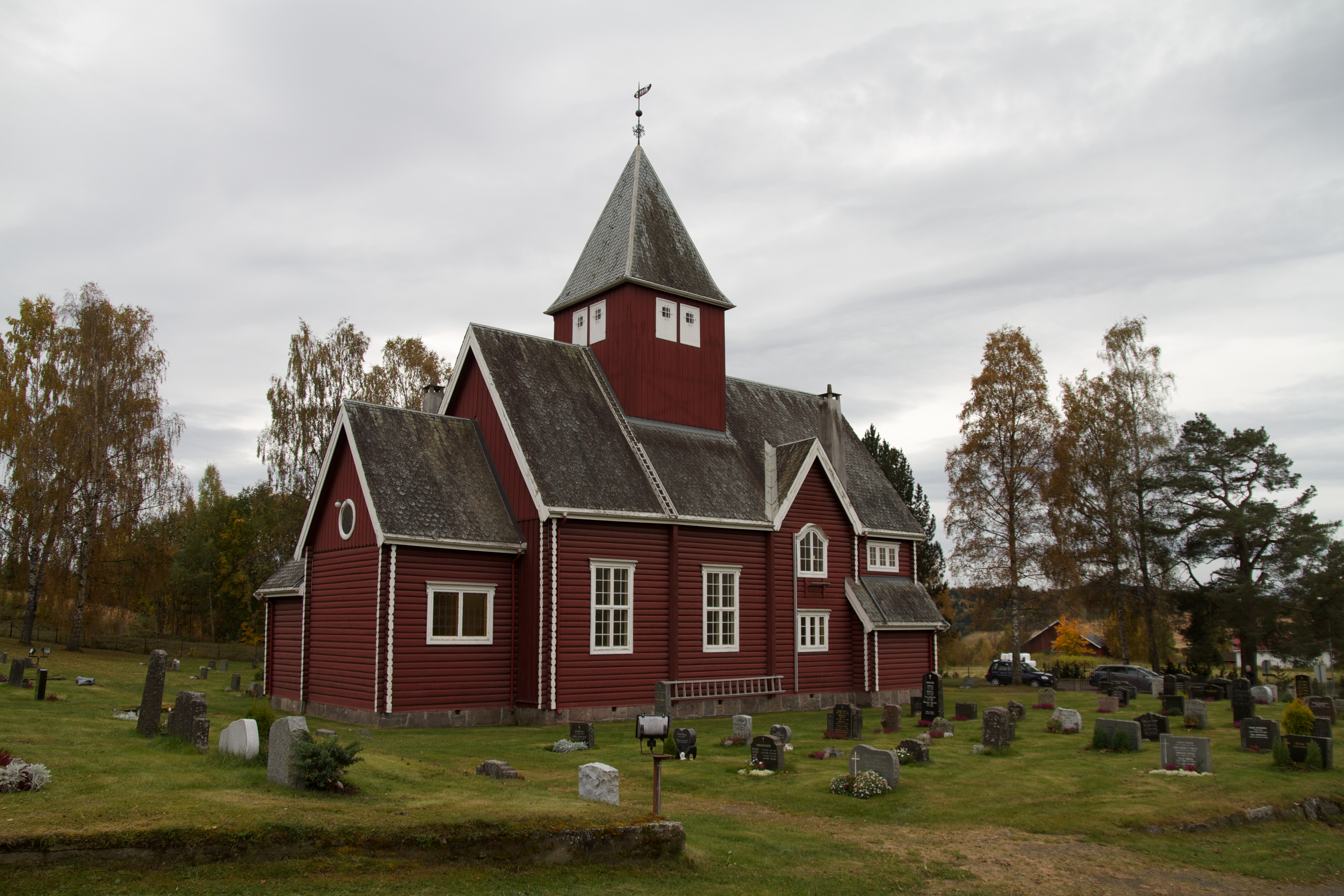

== See also ==
- List of churches in Hamar
