= Bjoneroa =

Village in Gran Municipality, Norway

- Village
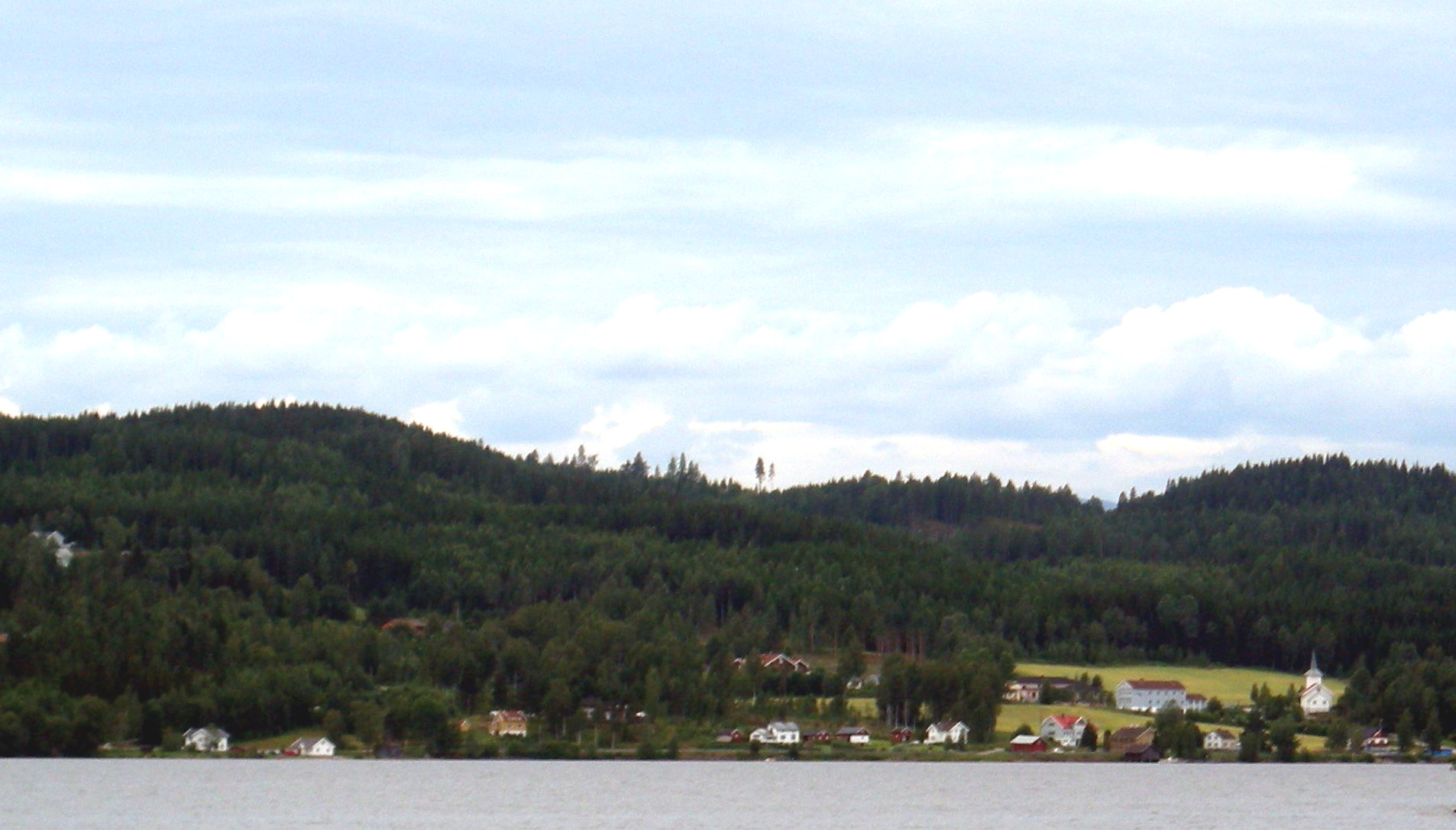
- View of the village
- Interactive map of Bjoneroa
- Location within Innlandet Location within Norway
- Coordinates: 60.52374°N 10.28467°E
- Country: Norway
- Region: Eastern Norway
- County: Innlandet
- District: Hadeland
- Municipality: Gran Municipality
- Elevation: 163 m (535 ft)
- Time zone: UTC+01:00 (CET)
  - Summer (DST): UTC+02:00 (CEST)
- Post Code: 3522 Bjoneroa

Bjoneroa is a village in Gran Municipality in Innlandet county, Norway. The village is located along the western shore of Norway's fourth largest lake, Randsfjorden. The village lies in the far northwestern part of Gran, just along the municipal border with Søndre Land Municipality. The village had about 118 residents in 2017.

There is a 1.25-kilometre (0.78 mi) long car ferry from Bjoneroa to Horn on the opposite side of the lake Randsfjorden. This is the only car ferry in Norway that operates year-round on an inland freshwater lake.

Sørum Church is located in the village along with a fire station, school, nursing home, gas station, and grocery store. The local business community consists of the timber trade and millwork, in addition to seasonal tourism. These industries employ only a small part of the population. In addition, others are employed in the public sector at schools and nursing homes. Many residents of the area commute to the neighboring Søndre Land Municipality and Jevnaker Municipality.

== Geography ==
The landscape consists mainly of steep and wooded hills. These flatten out to a plateau at an elevation of about 400 metres (1,300 ft) above sea level. There are a large number of lakes surrounding the village area. The population mainly lives along the Randsfjorden, where the best opportunities for agriculture are, but some also do agriculture/forestry further up in the hills.
