= Sørum Church (Hadeland) =

Church in Innlandet, Norway

- Sørum kirke
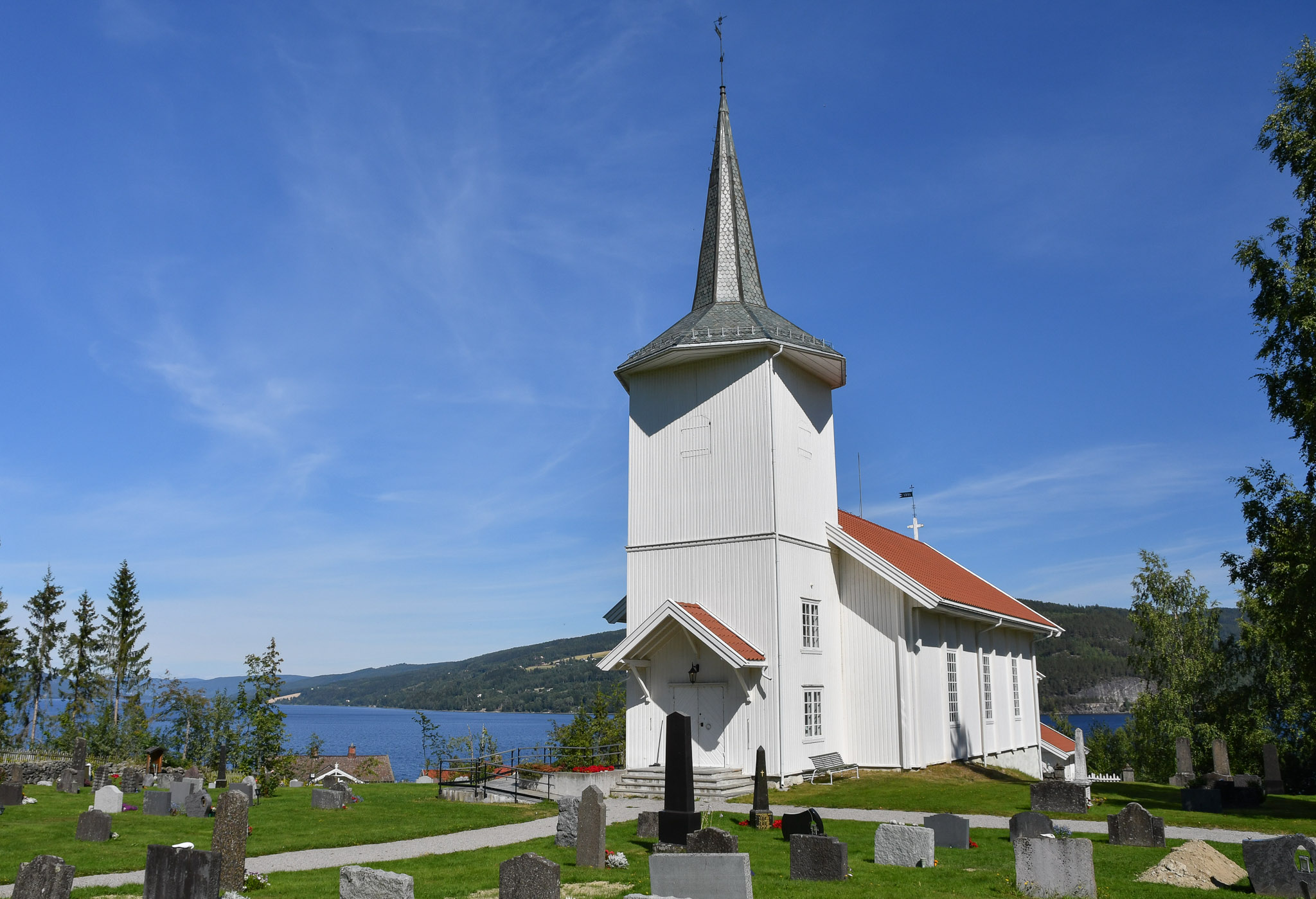
- View of the church
- Sørum Church
- 60°31′00″N 10°17′44″E
- Location: Gran Municipality, Innlandet
- Country: Norway
- Denomination: Church of Norway
- Churchmanship: Evangelical Lutheran

History
- Former name: Sørum kapell
- Status: Parish church
- Founded: 1861
- Consecrated: 25 September 1861

Architecture
- Functional status: Active
- Architect: Jacob Wilhelm Nordan
- Architectural type: Long church
- Groundbreaking: 22 October 1860
- Completed: 1861 (165 years ago)

Specifications
- Capacity: 220
- Materials: Wood

Administration
- Diocese: Hamar bispedømme
- Deanery: Hadeland og Land prosti
- Parish: Bjoneroa
- Norwegian Cultural Heritage Site
- Type: Church
- Status: Not protected
- ID: 85062

Sørum Church (Norwegian: Sørum kirke) is a parish church of the Church of Norway in Gran Municipality in Innlandet county, Norway. It is located in the village of Bjoneroa. It is the church for the Bjoneroa parish which is part of the Hadeland og Land prosti (deanery) in the Diocese of Hamar. The white, wooden church was built in a long church design in 1861 using plans drawn up by the architect Jacob Wilhelm Nordan. The church seats about 220 people.

== History ==
Planning for a new church in the Bjoneroa area began in the 1850s. Jacob Wilhelm Nordan was hired to make designs for the new church. The foundation stone was laid on 22 October 1860. It was a wooden long church. The timber was donated and the construction work was led by Lars Jacobsen Hvinden. The church was consecrated by the rector on 25 September 1861.

== See also ==
- List of churches in Hamar
