= Grimsrud =

Grimsrud is a surname. Notable people with the surname include:

- Beate Grimsrud (1963–2020), Norwegian writer
- Lars Grimsrud, American aerospace engineer and performance automobile enthusiast
- Lawrence Grimsrud (1871–1956), American lawyer and politician
