= Gran Municipality =

Municipality in Innlandet, Norway

Gran Municipality Gran kommune
- Municipality
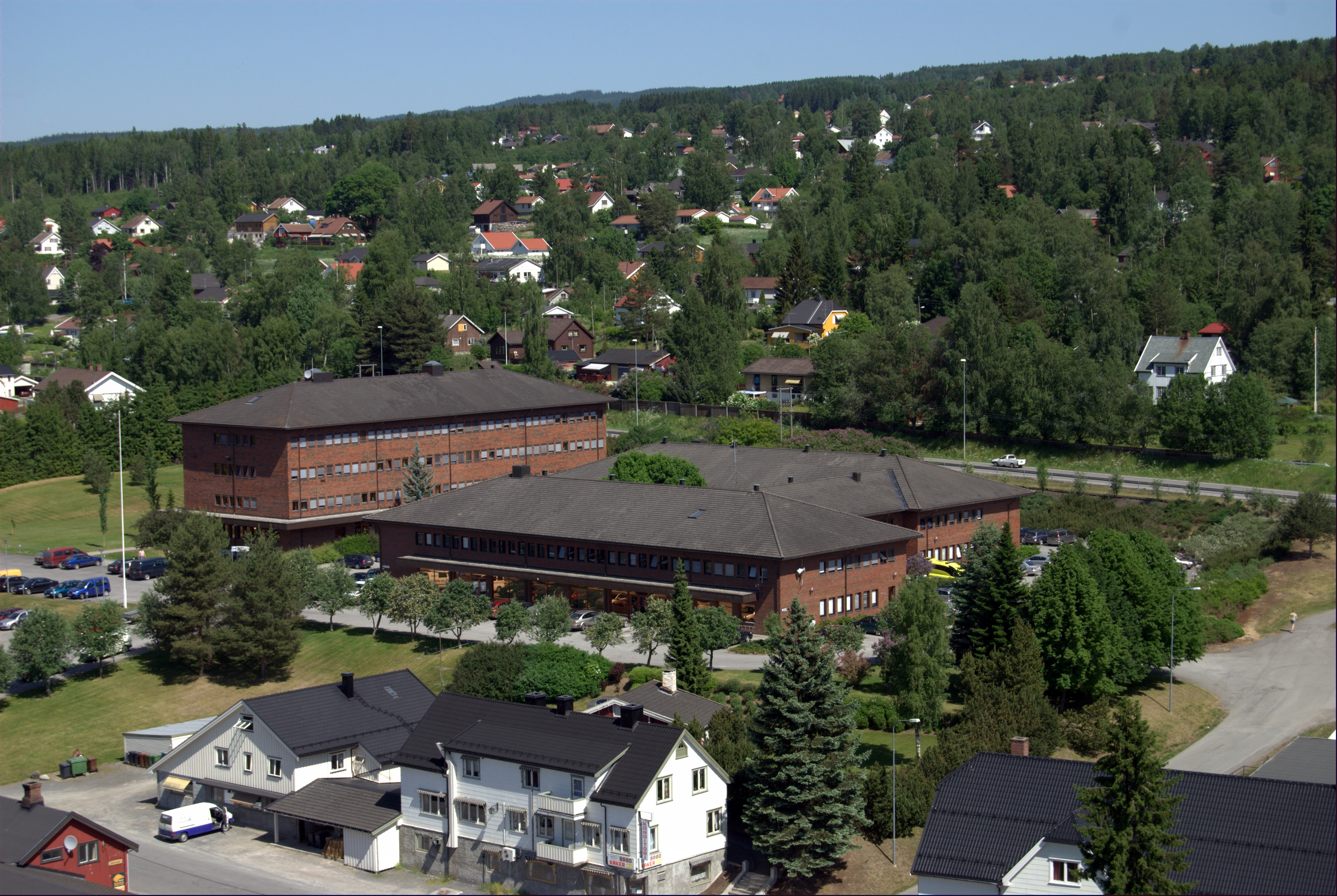
- Municipal building in Jaren

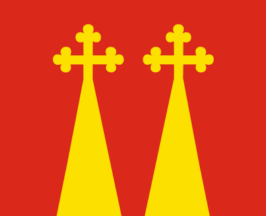
- Flag Coat of arms

- Innlandet within Norway

- Gran within Innlandet
- Coordinates: 60°26′28″N 10°29′44″E
- Country: Norway
- County: Innlandet
- District: Hadeland
- Established: 1 Jan 1838
  - Created as: Formannskapsdistrikt
- Administrative centre: Jaren

Government
  - Mayor (2023): Gunn Elisabeth Alm Thoresen (Ap)

Area
  - Total: 756.65 km^{2} (292.14 sq mi)
  - Land: 656.68 km^{2} (253.55 sq mi)
  - Water: 99.97 km^{2} (38.60 sq mi) 13.2%
  - Rank: #148 in Norway
- Highest elevation: 812.52 m (2,665.7 ft)

Population (2025)
  - Total: 13,660
  - Rank: #89 in Norway
  - Density: 18.1/km^{2} (47/sq mi)
  - Change (10 years): ▼ −0.1%
- Demonym(s): Gransokning; Granasokning

Official language
  - Norwegian form: Bokmål
- Time zone: UTC+01:00 (CET)
  - Summer (DST): UTC+02:00 (CEST)
- ISO 3166 code: NO-3446
- Website: Official website

Gran is a municipality in Innlandet county, Norway. It is located in the traditional district of Hadeland. The administrative centre of the municipality is the village of Jaren. Other villages in Gran include Bjoneroa, Brandbu, Egge, Gran, and Ringstad.

The 756.65-square-kilometre (292.14 sq mi) municipality is the 148th largest by area out of the 357 municipalities in Norway. Gran Municipality is the 89th most populous municipality in Norway with a population of 13,660. The municipality's population density is 18.1 inhabitants per square kilometre (47/sq mi) and its population has decreased by 0.1% over the previous 10-year period.

== General information ==
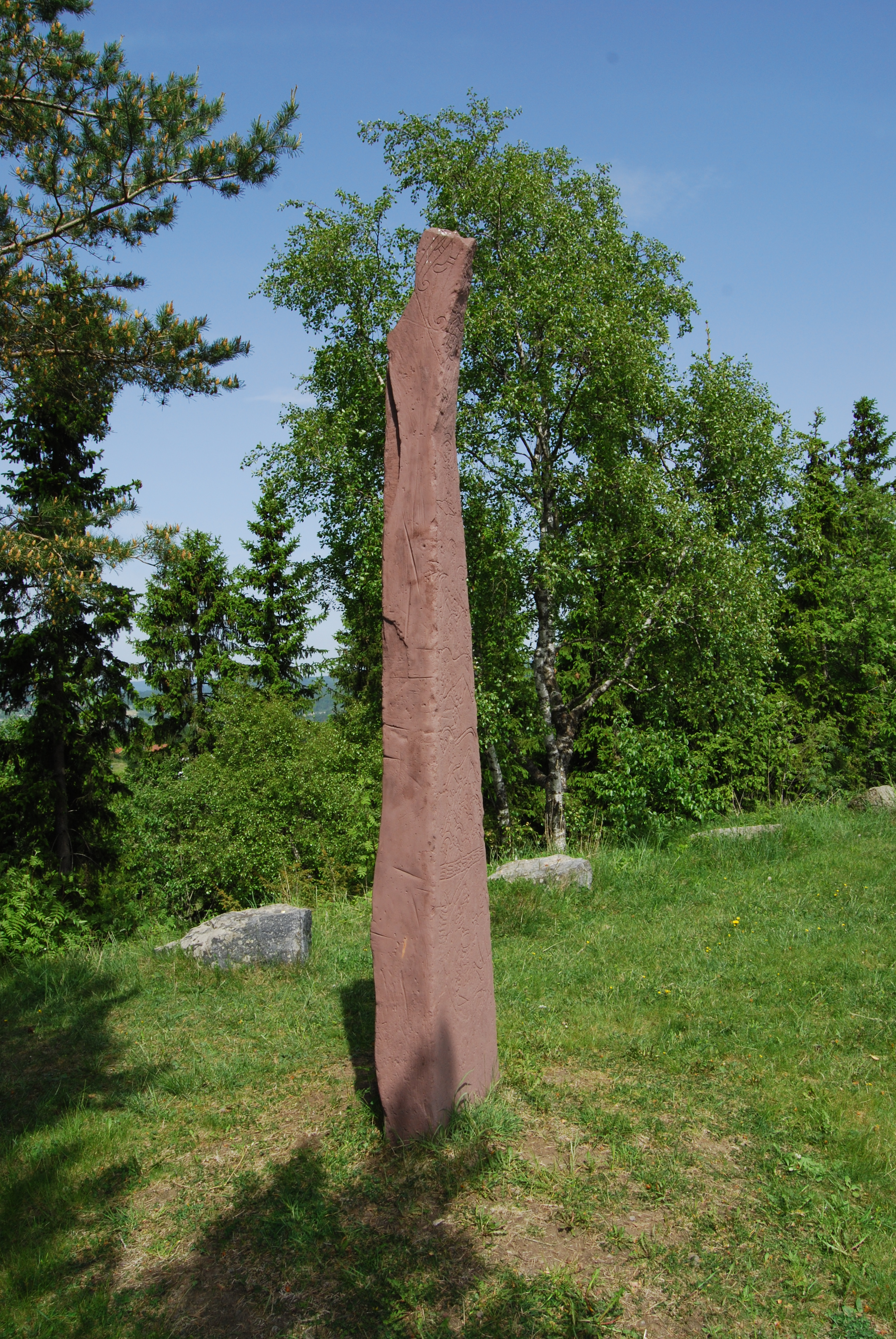
Replica of Dynna Runestone at Hadeland Folkemuseum

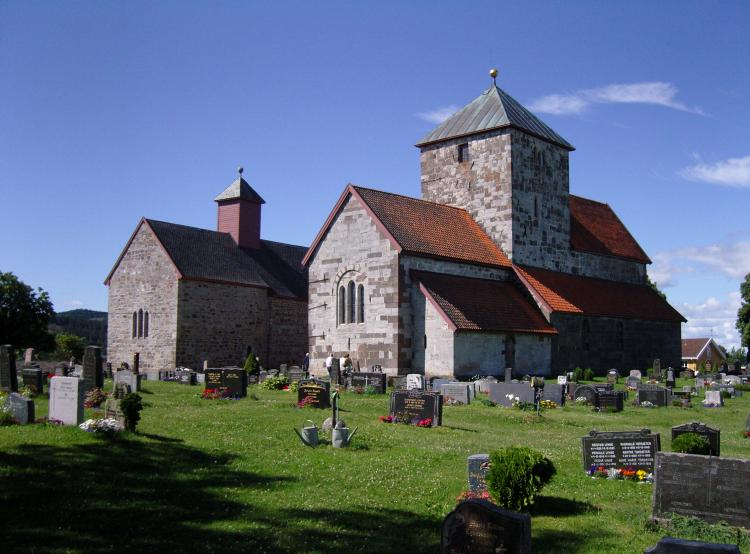
The Sister Churches

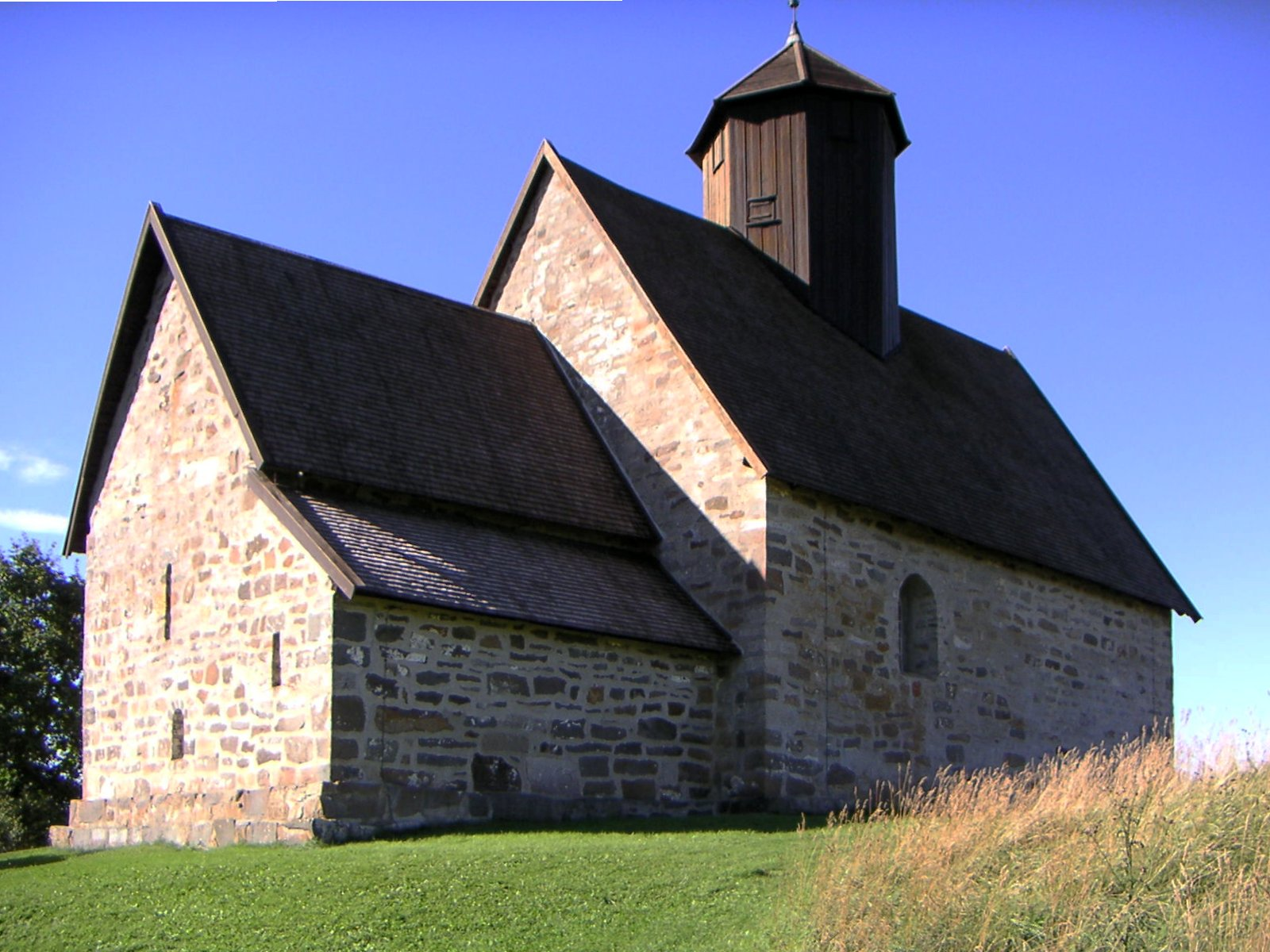
Old Tingelstad Church

The prestegjeld of Gran was established as a municipality on 1 January 1838 (see formannskapsdistrikt law). On 1 January 1874, an unpopulated area of Gran Municipality was transferred to the neighboring Jevnaker Municipality. On 1 January 1897, the municipality was divided into two. The northern part of the municipality (population: 4,719) became the new Brandbu Municipality and the southern part of the municipality (population: 3,897) remained as Gran Municipality.

During the 1960s, there were many municipal mergers across Norway due to the work of the Schei Committee. On 1 January 1962, the Furulund area of Gran Municipality on the west side of the lake Randsfjorden (population: 180) was transferred to the neighboring Jevnaker Municipality. Also on that date, the remaining part of Gran Municipality (population: 5,249) was merged with Brandbu Municipality (population: 6,477) to form a new, larger Gran Municipality. On 1 January 1964, the part of Gran Municipality located at the south end of the lake Einavatnet (population: 12) was transferred to the neighboring Vestre Toten Municipality.

=== Name ===
The municipality (originally the parish) is named after the old Gran farm (Old Norse: Grǫn). The name is identical with the word grǫn which means "spruce tree".

=== Coat of arms ===
The coat of arms was granted on 11 December 1987. The official blazon is "Gules, two piles reversed from each emerges a cross bottony Or" (Norwegian: I rødt to gull spisser som ender i kløverbladkors). This means the arms have a red field (background) and the charge is two triangles stretching upwards with a bottony cross on the tip of each triangle. The charge has a tincture of Or which means it is commonly colored yellow, but if it is made out of metal, then gold is used. The triangles and crosses were meant to represent the spires of the medieval Sister Churches which are located in the municipality. The arms were designed by Kari Ruud Flem from Jevnaker. The municipal flag has the same design as the coat of arms.

=== Churches ===
The Church of Norway has four parishes (sokn) within Gran Municipality. It is part of the Hadeland og Land prosti (deanery) in the Diocese of Hamar.

Churches in Gran Municipality
Parish (sokn)	Church name	Location of the church	Year built
Bjoneroa	Sørum Church	Bjoneroa	1861
Brandbu	Nes Church	Røykenvik	1730
Gran/Tingelstad	Grymyr Church	Grymyr	2003
Gran/Tingelstad	St. Mary's Church	Granavollen	c. 1150
Gran/Tingelstad	St. Nicholas' Church	Granavollen	c. 1150
Gran/Tingelstad	Tingelstad Church	Tingelstad	1866
Gran/Tingelstad	Old Tingelstad Church	Tingelstad	c. 1220
Moen/Ål	Moen Church	Jaren	1914
Moen/Ål	Ål Church	Gran	1929

== History ==
Number of minorities (1st and 2nd generation) in Gran by country of origin in 2015
Ancestry	Number
Lithuania	190
Eritrea	142
Poland	142
Somalia	139
Kosovo	64
Iraq	47
Philippines	45
Sweden	45
Thailand	44
Denmark	36

Granavollen is the site of the Sister Churches (Norwegian: Søsterkirkene). These two stone churches are from the Middle Ages and were constructed side by side. The smaller and older is the Mariakirke, a single nave church built in the Romanesque style, built sometime before 1150. The neighbouring Nikolaikirke is a three-aisled basilica, probably inspired by the construction of the St. Halvardskirke in Oslo. It was built sometime between 1150 and 1200. According to local folklore, the churches were built by two sisters. These two detested each other so much they could not share the same church. A more likely explanation however, is that the Mariakirke was built for the local congregation, while the Nikolaikirke was the main church for Hadeland parish. The Granavollen stone is located behind the Nikolaikirken.

The Old Tingelstad Church (Tingelstad St.Petri Kirke) is another medieval stone church. It is a Romanesque stone church, dated to the 12th century and dedicated to St.Peter. This church has survived even though it has not been in regular use for some 140 years.

This is also the location of Hadeland Folkemuseum with a collection of buildings from the area, farm implements, a grave mound from the Viking Age, and a replica of the 11th century Dynna Runestone (Dynnasteinen). It also holds an archive of photographs and documents.

== Economy ==
In 2002, the economy of the municipality was 24,098 kr in free income per inhabitant, and the net debt per inhabitant was 41,835 kr (also municipal economy, not private). Health care spending represents about one-third of the total municipal budget, which is 7.5% higher than the average for Norway. The Norwegian National Road 4 runs through the most populated parts of Gran, bringing lots of transportation traffic.

== Geography ==
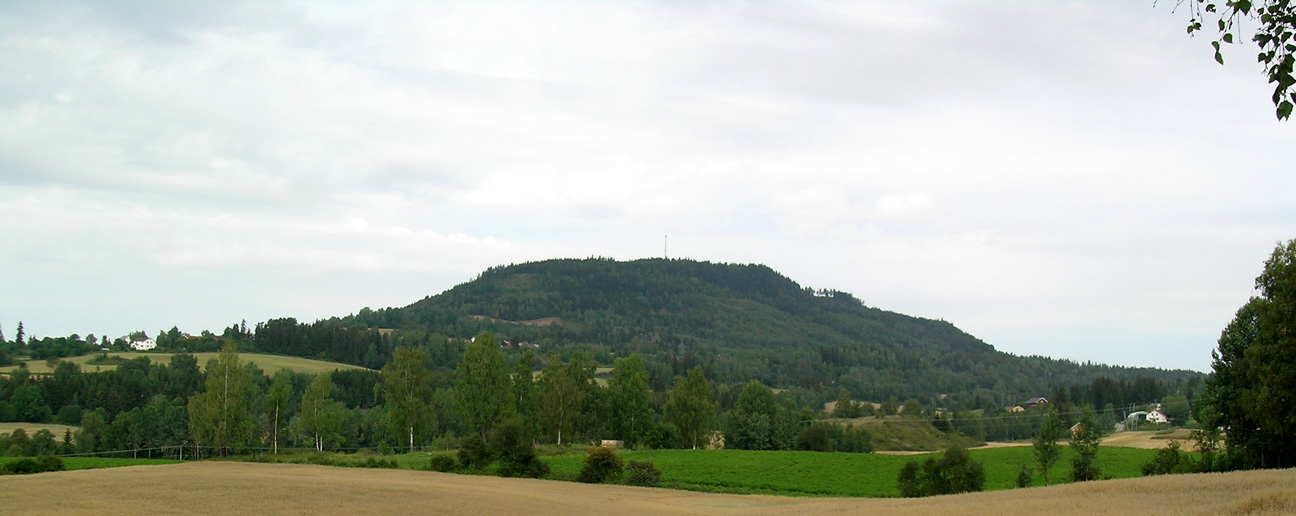
View of Brandbukampen in Gran municipality

Gran Municipality is part of the Hadeland region. It is bordered to the north by Søndre Land Municipality and Vestre Toten Municipality (in Innlandet county), to the east by Hurdal Municipality and Nannestad Municipality (both in Akershus county), to the south by Lunner Municipality and Jevnaker Municipality (both in Akershus county), and to the west by Ringerike Municipality (in Buskerud county). There are several lakes in Gran Municipality including Øyangen, Randsfjorden, and Vestre Bjonevatnet. The highest point in the municipality is the 812.52-metre (2,665.7 ft) tall mountain Lushaugen, located on the border with Hurdal Municipality.

== Government ==
Gran Municipality is responsible for primary education (through 10th grade), outpatient health services, senior citizen services, welfare and other social services, zoning, economic development, and municipal roads and utilities. The municipality is governed by a municipal council of directly elected representatives. The mayor is indirectly elected by a vote of the municipal council. The municipality is under the jurisdiction of the Vestoppland og Valdres District Court and the Eidsivating Court of Appeal.

=== Municipal council ===
The municipal council (Kommunestyre) of Gran Municipality is made up of 27 representatives that are elected to four year terms. The tables below show the current and historical composition of the council by political party.

Gran kommunestyre 2023–2027
Party name (in Norwegian)	Number of representatives
Labour Party (Arbeiderpartiet)	9
Progress Party (Fremskrittspartiet)	3
Conservative Party (Høyre)	5
Red Party (Rødt)	1
Centre Party (Senterpartiet)	2
Socialist Left Party (Sosialistisk Venstreparti)	1
Gran local list (Gran Bygdeliste)	6
Total number of members:	27

Gran kommunestyre 2019–2023
Party name (in Norwegian)	Number of representatives
Labour Party (Arbeiderpartiet)	8
Progress Party (Fremskrittspartiet)	1
Conservative Party (Høyre)	3
Centre Party (Senterpartiet)	6
Joint list of the Red Party (Rødt) and the Socialist Left Party (Sosialistisk Venstreparti)	1
Gran local list (Gran Bygdeliste)	8
Total number of members:	27

Gran kommunestyre 2015–2019
Party name (in Norwegian)	Number of representatives
Labour Party (Arbeiderpartiet)	9
Progress Party (Fremskrittspartiet)	2
Green Party (Miljøpartiet De Grønne)	1
Conservative Party (Høyre)	3
Centre Party (Senterpartiet)	3
Gran local list (Gran bygdeliste)	9
Total number of members:	27

Gran kommunestyre 2011–2015
Party name (in Norwegian)	Number of representatives
Labour Party (Arbeiderpartiet)	10
Progress Party (Fremskrittspartiet)	2
Conservative Party (Høyre)	5
Centre Party (Senterpartiet)	3
Socialist Left Party (Sosialistisk Venstreparti)	1
Liberal Party (Venstre)	1
Gran local list (Gran Bygdeliste)	5
Total number of members:	27

Gran kommunestyre 2007–2011
Party name (in Norwegian)	Number of representatives
Labour Party (Arbeiderpartiet)	7
Progress Party (Fremskrittspartiet)	3
Conservative Party (Høyre)	2
Christian Democratic Party (Kristelig Folkeparti)	1
Centre Party (Senterpartiet)	3
Socialist Left Party (Sosialistisk Venstreparti)	1
Gran local list (Gran bygdeliste)	10
Total number of members:	27

Gran kommunestyre 2003–2007
Party name (in Norwegian)	Number of representatives
Labour Party (Arbeiderpartiet)	13
Progress Party (Fremskrittspartiet)	4
Conservative Party (Høyre)	3
Christian Democratic Party (Kristelig Folkeparti)	1
Centre Party (Senterpartiet)	4
Socialist Left Party (Sosialistisk Venstreparti)	2
Total number of members:	27

Gran kommunestyre 1999–2003
Party name (in Norwegian)	Number of representatives
Labour Party (Arbeiderpartiet)	17
Progress Party (Fremskrittspartiet)	4
Conservative Party (Høyre)	5
Christian Democratic Party (Kristelig Folkeparti)	3
Centre Party (Senterpartiet)	6
Socialist Left Party (Sosialistisk Venstreparti)	3
Liberal Party (Venstre)	1
Total number of members:	39

Gran kommunestyre 1995–1999
Party name (in Norwegian)	Number of representatives
Labour Party (Arbeiderpartiet)	16
Progress Party (Fremskrittspartiet)	5
Conservative Party (Høyre)	4
Christian Democratic Party (Kristelig Folkeparti)	2
Centre Party (Senterpartiet)	9
Socialist Left Party (Sosialistisk Venstreparti)	2
Liberal Party (Venstre)	1
Total number of members:	39

Gran kommunestyre 1991–1995
Party name (in Norwegian)	Number of representatives
Labour Party (Arbeiderpartiet)	18
Progress Party (Fremskrittspartiet)	2
Conservative Party (Høyre)	4
Christian Democratic Party (Kristelig Folkeparti)	2
Centre Party (Senterpartiet)	9
Socialist Left Party (Sosialistisk Venstreparti)	4
Total number of members:	39

Gran kommunestyre 1987–1991
Party name (in Norwegian)	Number of representatives
Labour Party (Arbeiderpartiet)	20
Progress Party (Fremskrittspartiet)	4
Conservative Party (Høyre)	5
Christian Democratic Party (Kristelig Folkeparti)	2
Centre Party (Senterpartiet)	6
Socialist Left Party (Sosialistisk Venstreparti)	1
Liberal Party (Venstre)	1
Total number of members:	39

Gran kommunestyre 1983–1987
Party name (in Norwegian)	Number of representatives
Labour Party (Arbeiderpartiet)	21
Progress Party (Fremskrittspartiet)	2
Conservative Party (Høyre)	6
Christian Democratic Party (Kristelig Folkeparti)	2
Centre Party (Senterpartiet)	6
Socialist Left Party (Sosialistisk Venstreparti)	1
Liberal Party (Venstre)	1
Total number of members:	39

Gran kommunestyre 1979–1983
Party name (in Norwegian)	Number of representatives
Labour Party (Arbeiderpartiet)	20
Conservative Party (Høyre)	6
Christian Democratic Party (Kristelig Folkeparti)	3
Centre Party (Senterpartiet)	8
Socialist Left Party (Sosialistisk Venstreparti)	1
Liberal Party (Venstre)	1
Total number of members:	39

Gran kommunestyre 1975–1979
Party name (in Norwegian)	Number of representatives
Labour Party (Arbeiderpartiet)	19
Conservative Party (Høyre)	3
Christian Democratic Party (Kristelig Folkeparti)	3
Centre Party (Senterpartiet)	10
Socialist Left Party (Sosialistisk Venstreparti)	3
Liberal Party (Venstre)	1
Total number of members:	39

Gran kommunestyre 1971–1975
Party name (in Norwegian)	Number of representatives
Labour Party (Arbeiderpartiet)	20
Conservative Party (Høyre)	2
Communist Party (Kommunistiske Parti)	1
Christian Democratic Party (Kristelig Folkeparti)	2
Centre Party (Senterpartiet)	11
Socialist People's Party (Sosialistisk Folkeparti)	2
Liberal Party (Venstre)	1
Total number of members:	39

Gran kommunestyre 1967–1971
Party name (in Norwegian)	Number of representatives
Labour Party (Arbeiderpartiet)	22
Conservative Party (Høyre)	3
Christian Democratic Party (Kristelig Folkeparti)	2
Centre Party (Senterpartiet)	10
Socialist People's Party (Sosialistisk Folkeparti)	1
Liberal Party (Venstre)	1
Total number of members:	39

Gran kommunestyre 1963–1967
Party name (in Norwegian)	Number of representatives
Labour Party (Arbeiderpartiet)	22
Conservative Party (Høyre)	3
Communist Party (Kommunistiske Parti)	1
Christian Democratic Party (Kristelig Folkeparti)	2
Centre Party (Senterpartiet)	10
Liberal Party (Venstre)	1
Total number of members:	39

Gran herredsstyre 1959–1963
Party name (in Norwegian)	Number of representatives
Labour Party (Arbeiderpartiet)	12
Communist Party (Kommunistiske Parti)	1
Joint List(s) of Non-Socialist Parties (Borgerlige Felleslister)	10
Total number of members:	23

Gran herredsstyre 1955–1959
Party name (in Norwegian)	Number of representatives
Labour Party (Arbeiderpartiet)	9
Communist Party (Kommunistiske Parti)	2
Joint List(s) of Non-Socialist Parties (Borgerlige Felleslister)	12
Total number of members:	23

Gran herredsstyre 1951–1955
Party name (in Norwegian)	Number of representatives
Labour Party (Arbeiderpartiet)	8
Joint List(s) of Non-Socialist Parties (Borgerlige Felleslister)	8
Total number of members:	16

Gran herredsstyre 1947–1951
Party name (in Norwegian)	Number of representatives
Labour Party (Arbeiderpartiet)	5
Communist Party (Kommunistiske Parti)	1
Christian Democratic Party (Kristelig Folkeparti)	1
Farmers' Party (Bondepartiet)	7
List of workers, fishermen, and small farmholders (Arbeidere, fiskere, småbrukere liste)	2
Total number of members:	16

Gran herredsstyre 1945–1947
Party name (in Norwegian)	Number of representatives
Labour Party (Arbeiderpartiet)	7
Communist Party (Kommunistiske Parti)	1
Christian Democratic Party (Kristelig Folkeparti)	2
Farmers' Party (Bondepartiet)	6
Total number of members:	16

Gran herredsstyre 1937–1940*
Party name (in Norwegian)	Number of representatives
Labour Party (Arbeiderpartiet)	7
Farmers' Party (Bondepartiet)	8
Joint List(s) of Non-Socialist Parties (Borgerlige Felleslister)	1
Total number of members:	16
Note: Due to the German occupation of Norway during World War II, no elections were held for new municipal councils until after the war ended in 1945.

=== Mayors ===
The mayor (Norwegian: ordfører) of Gran Municipality is the political leader of the municipality and the chairperson of the municipal council. Here is a list of people who have held this position:

- 1838–1839: Carl Jacob Bergh
- 1840–1841: Lars Hvinden
- 1842–1843: Anders Iversen Kjeffen
- 1844–1846: Mr. Schandorff
- 1847–1847: Ole Horgen
- 1848–1849: N. Stenersen
- 1850–1851: Tharald Bergh
- 1851–1855: Thorvald Buchholz
- 1856–1861: Amund Larsen Gulden
- 1864–1867: Amund Larsen Gulden
- 1871–1871: Peder Horgen
- 1872–1875: Gulbrand Hvaleby
- 1876–1877: T. Grindaker
- 1878–1885: Iver Larsen Hvamstad (V)
- 1886–1901: Peder S. Mørtvedt
- 1902–1907: Lars Dynna
- 1908–1909: J. Horgen
- 1909–1910: Helge Klæstad (H)
- 1911–1913: J.A. Elnæs (Ap)
- 1914–1916: Helge Klæstad (H)
- 1917–1919: Nils Helmen
- 1920–1922: Helge Klæstad (H)
- 1923–1925: P.P. Grini (Bp)
- 1925–1928: Emil Nielsen (Bp)
- 1929–1931: P.P. Grini (Bp)
- 1931–1934: Emil Nielsen (Bp)
- 1934–1937: Tollek Onsaker (Bp)
- 1937–1941: Olaf Prestsæter (Bp)
- 1941–19: Kåre Framstad (NS)
- 1945–1946: Olaf Prestsæter (Bp)
- 1946–1948: Paul A. Grini (Bp)
- 1948–1951: Axel Moger (Ap)
- 1952–1954: Lars Skovly (Ap)
- 1955–1956: Axel Bråten (Ap)
- 1956–1959: Torgrim Dynna (Bp)
- 1960–1961: Kristian Torgalsen (Ap)
- 1962–1965: Jens Røisli (Ap)
- 1966–1970: Alf Skovly (Ap)
- 1970–1979: Gunnar Sagbakken (Ap)
- 1980–1995: Lars Arne Høydal (Ap)
- 1996–2005: Rigmor Aasrud (Ap)
- 2005–2007: Roald Braathen (Ap)
- 2007–2011: Inger Staxrud (LL)
- 2011–2015: Knut Magnar Lehre (Ap)
- 2015–2019: Willy Westhagen (LL)
- 2019–2023: Randi Eek Thorsen (Ap)
- 2023–present: Gunn Elisabeth Alm Thoresen (Ap)

== Sister cities ==
Gran has sister city agreements with the following places:

- - Favrskov, Region Midtjylland, Denmark
- - Kungsbacka, Halland County, Sweden
- - Lugazi, Kampala District, Uganda
- - Mukono, Mukono District, Uganda
- - Pärnu, Pärnu County, Estonia
- - Saarijärvi, Länsi-Suomi, Finland

== Notable people ==
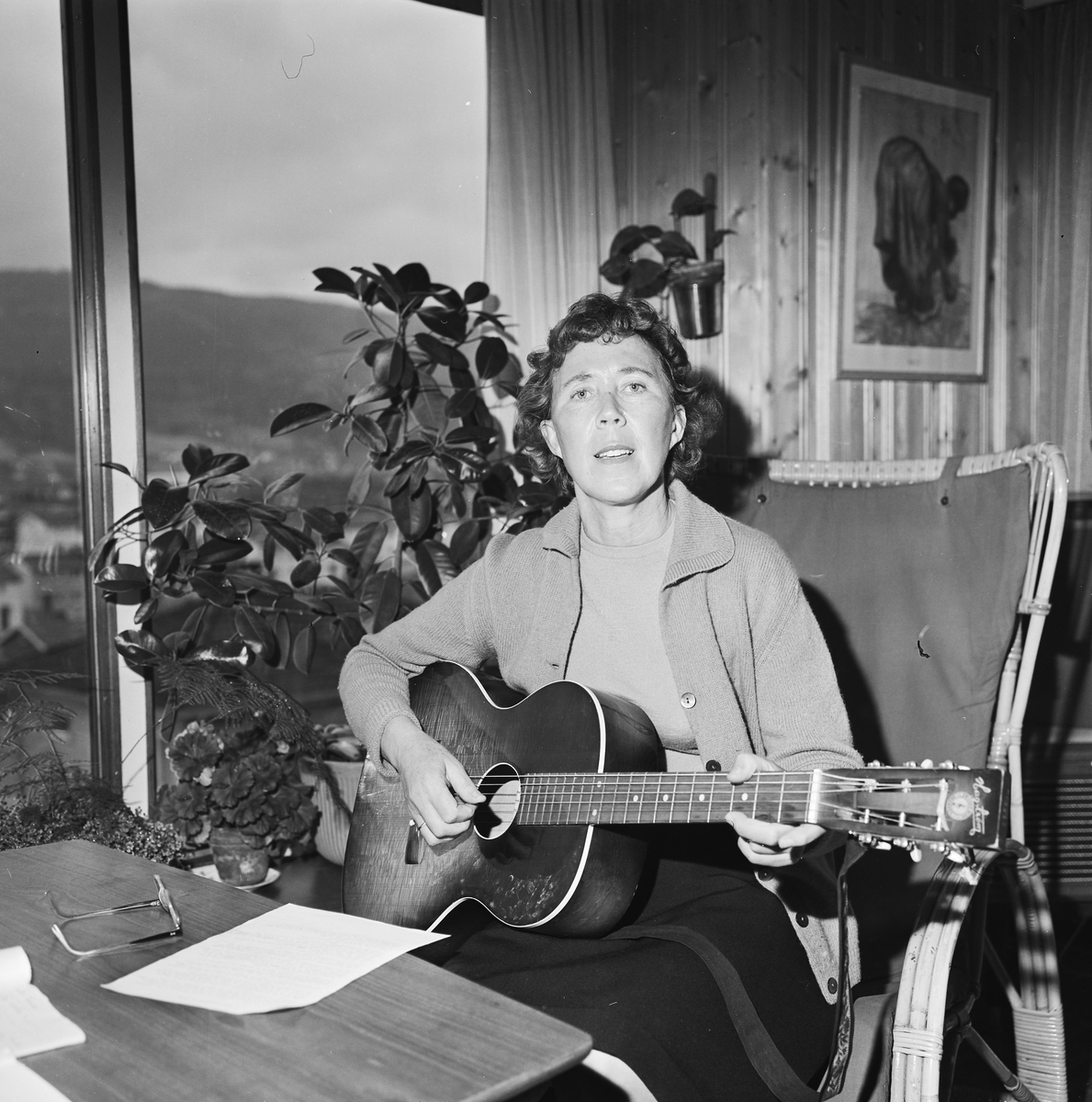
Kirsten Langbo, 1964

- Cally Monrad (1879 in Gran – 1950), a singer, actress, and poet
- Hans Stenseth (1896 in Gran – 1994), a leading flautist
- Kristian Horn (1903 in Brandbu – 1981), a botanist, academic, and humanist
- Kirsten Langbo (1909 in Gran – 1996), a children's writer, singer-songwriter, and entertainer
- Ulla-Mari Brantenberg (born 1947), a glass artist who lives in Brandbu
- Espen Reinertsen (born 1979 in Gran), a saxophonist, flutist, composer, and music producer

=== Sport ===
- Sverre Fredheim (1907 in Gan – 1981), an American Olympic skier
- Torstein Seiersten (born 1931 in Brandbu), a retired speed skater who competed at the 1956 & 1960 Winter Olympics
- Trond-Arne Bredesen (born 1967 in Gran), a Nordic combined skier who competed at the 1988 Winter Olympics
