= Nes Church (Gran) =

Church in Innlandet, Norway

- Nes kirke
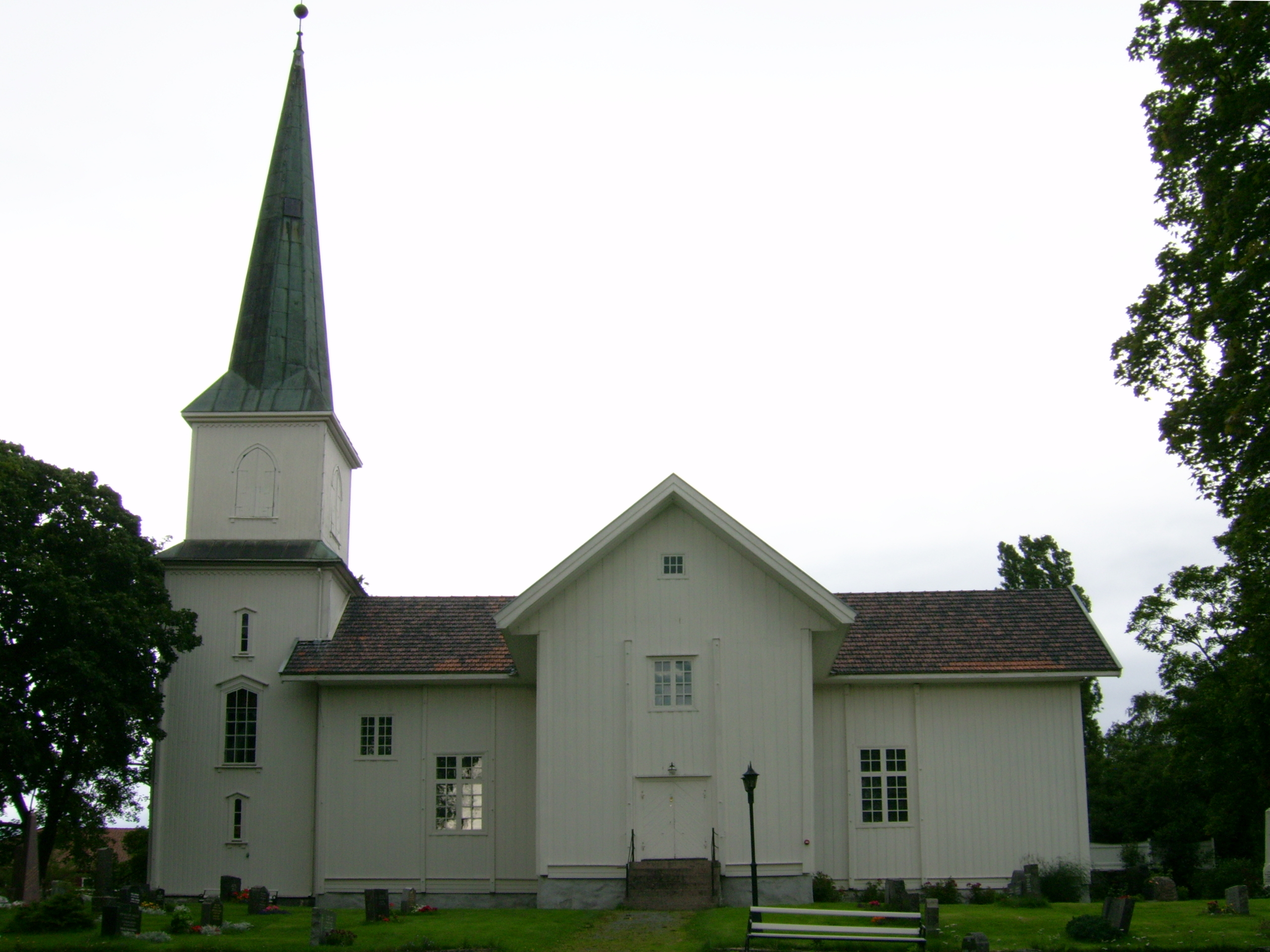
- View of the church
- Nes Church
- 60°25′51″N 10°27′16″E
- Location: Gran Municipality, Innlandet
- Country: Norway
- Denomination: Church of Norway
- Previous denomination: Catholic Church
- Churchmanship: Evangelical Lutheran

History
- Status: Parish church
- Founded: 12th century
- Consecrated: 1 November 1730

Architecture
- Functional status: Active
- Architectural type: Cruciform
- Completed: 1730 (296 years ago)

Specifications
- Capacity: 280
- Materials: Wood

Administration
- Diocese: Hamar bispedømme
- Deanery: Hadeland og Land prosti
- Parish: Brandbu
- Norwegian Cultural Heritage Site
- Type: Church
- Status: Automatically protected
- ID: 85114

Nes Church (Norwegian: Nes kirke) is a parish church of the Church of Norway in Gran Municipality in Innlandet county, Norway. It is located in the village of Røykenvik. It is the church for the Brandbu parish which is part of the Hadeland og Land prosti (deanery) in the Diocese of Hamar. The white, wooden church was built in a cruciform design in 1730 using plans drawn up by an unknown architect. The church seats about 280 people.

== History ==
The earliest existing historical records of the church date back to the year 1367, but the church was not built that year. The first church at Nes was a stone long church that was likely built during the 12th century. This church was located about 25 metres (82 ft) to the north of the present church site. The church had a nave and chancel with a tower on the roof of the nave. The tower was damaged during the 1600s by strong winds and this caused some problems inside the church. In 1683, the second floor seating balconies were enlarged. In 1694, a sacristy was built on the north side of the choir. Despite all the work done on the church, it remained too small for the congregation and it was also in poor condition.

During the 1720s, plans were made for a new church to replace the medieval stone building. From 1727 to 1730, a new wooden cruciform church was built about 25 metres (82 ft) to the south of the old church. The new church was consecrated on 1 November 1730. Afterwards, the old church was partially demolished. A report from 1743 stated that the walls and foundation of the old church were still standing. The quality of the new church does not seem to have been particularly well done, because about ten years after the church was built, there was a report which pointed out a number of matters that needed to be fixed, including the roof. The church got a second floor seating gallery and new pews in 1863. In 1886, a new tower was built to replace the old one.

== See also ==
- List of churches in Hamar
