= Randsfjorden =

Lake in Innlandet, Norway

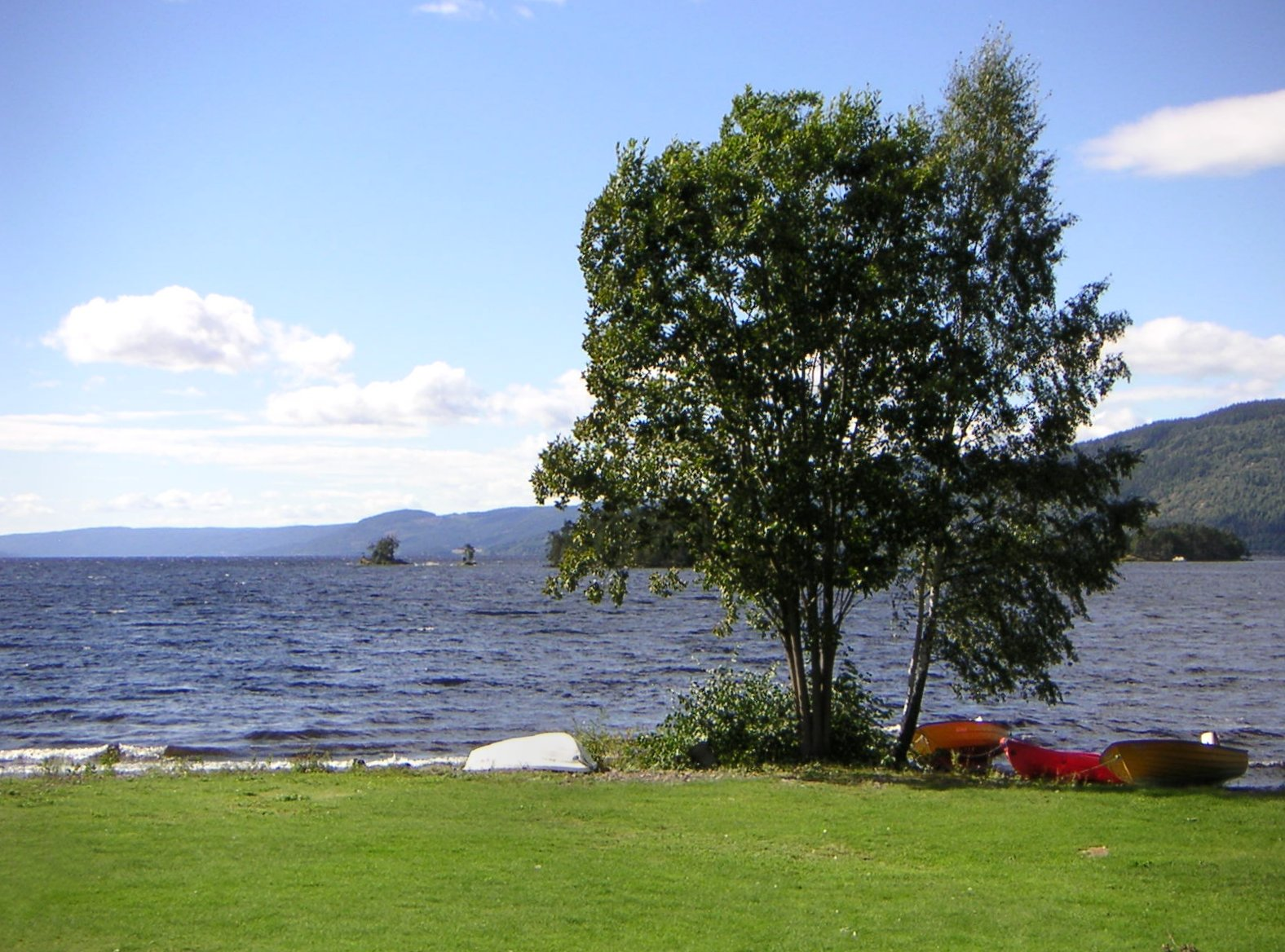
- Looking south from Grimsrud
- Interactive map of the lake
- Location: Innlandet and Akershus
- Coordinates: 60°23′25″N 10°23′39″E
- Type: glacial fjord lake
- Primary inflows: Dokka and Etna
- Primary outflows: Randselva
- Catchment area: 3,701.54 km^{2} (1,429.17 sq mi)
- Basin countries: Norway
- Max. length: 74.5 km (46.3 mi)
- Max. width: 4 km (2.5 mi)
- Surface area: 140.69 km^{2} (54.32 sq mi)
- Average depth: 47 m (154 ft)
- Max. depth: 131 m (430 ft)
- Water volume: 6.612 km^{3} (1.586 cu mi)
- Shore length^{1}: 203 km (126 mi)
- Surface elevation: 135 m (443 ft)
- References: NVE
- ^{1} Shore length is not a well-defined measure.

Randsfjorden is Norway's fourth-largest lake with an area of 140.7 square kilometres (54.3 sq mi). Its volume is estimated at just over 6.6 cubic kilometres (1.6 cu mi), and its greatest depth is 131 metres (430 ft). The lake is located at an elevation of 135 metres (443 ft) above sea level. It is located in Innlandet and Akershus counties in the municipalities of Gran, Jevnaker, Nordre Land, and Søndre Land in the traditional districts of Land and Hadeland. It is drained by the Randselva river.

== History ==
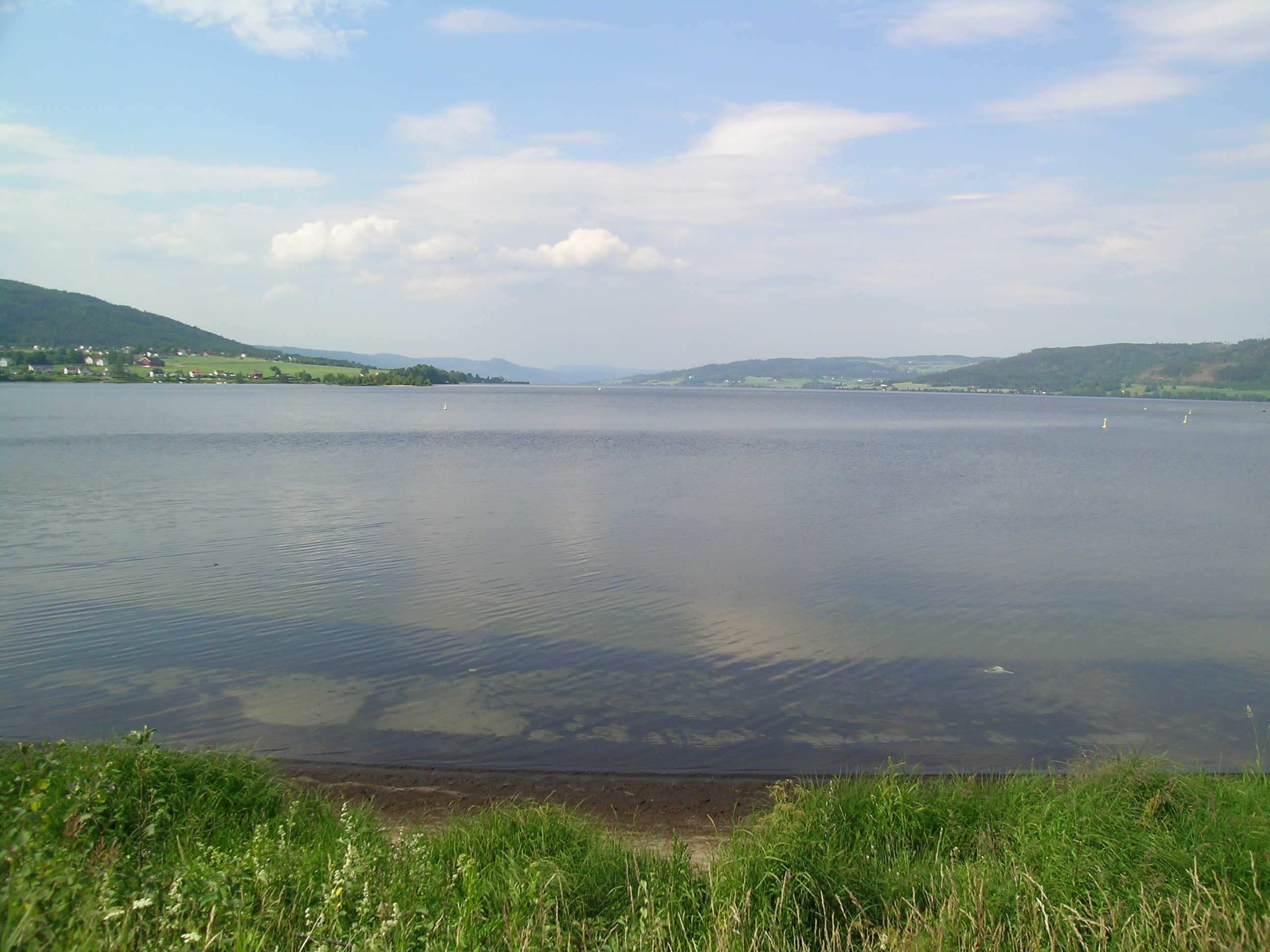
View northwards from Jevnaker

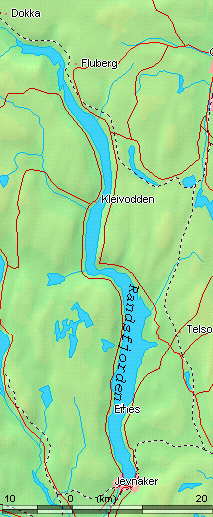
Map of the fjord

In Heimskringla, Snorri Sturluson recorded that Halfdan the Black (Halvdan Svarte), father of Harald Hårfagre, the first King of Norway, journeyed over the lake while returning home from a visit to Hadeland. Traveling with a horse and sleigh while the lake was supposedly frozen, he fell through the ice and drowned.

In modern times, many golf courses have been set up on the edge of the lake. The Tangen–Horn ferry runs between Horn on the east bank and Tangen on the west, which is Norway's last remaining and regularly operating car ferry connection on an inland lake. The sightseeing boat MS Kong Haud sails on the Randsfjorden from Jevnaker to Odnes.

=== Name ===
The Old Norse form of the name was just Rǫnd, derived from the word rǫnd which means "stripe" or "edge" (referring to the long and narrow form of the lake). The last element fjorden (the finite form of fjord) is a later addition to the name that was first recorded in 1691. Although the term "fjord" usually describes a saltwater inlet that is connected to the ocean, the Randsfjorden is actually a freshwater lake with a narrow shape, approximately aligned on a north–south axis.

== See also ==
- List of lakes of Norway
- Media related to Randsfjorden at Wikimedia Commons
