= Brandbu =

Village in Gran Municipality, Norway

- Village
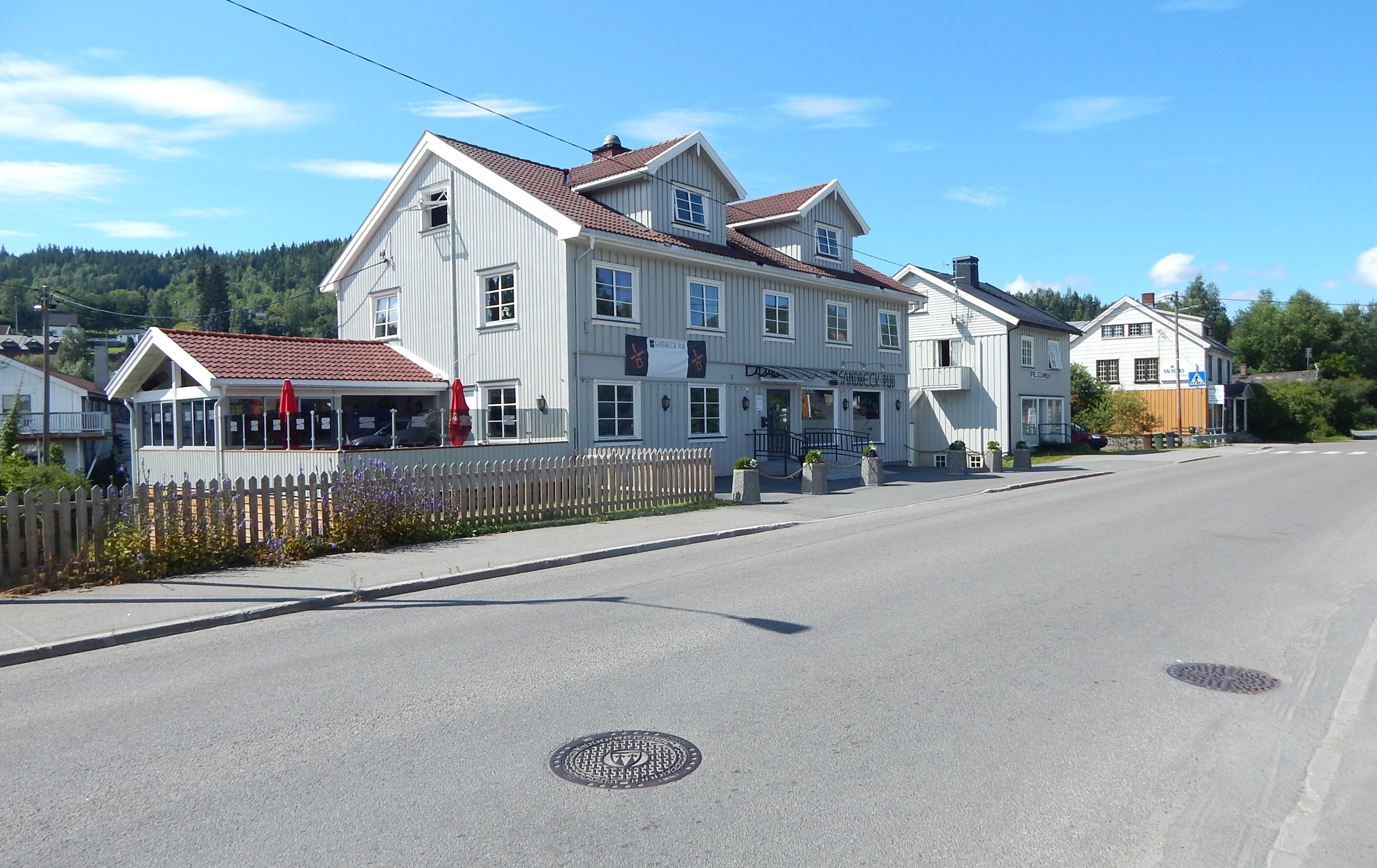
- View of the village's main road
- Interactive map of Brandbu
- Location within Innlandet Location within Norway
- Coordinates: 60.42214°N 10.50428°E
- Country: Norway
- Region: Eastern Norway
- County: Innlandet
- District: Hadeland
- Municipality: Gran Municipality

Area
  - Total: 5.7 km^{2} (2.2 sq mi)
- Elevation: 163 m (535 ft)

Population (2024)
  - Total: 5,148
  - Density: 903/km^{2} (2,340/sq mi)
- Time zone: UTC+01:00 (CET)
  - Summer (DST): UTC+02:00 (CEST)
- Post Code: 2760 Brandbu

Brandbu is a village in Gran Municipality in Innlandet county, Norway. The village is located in Hadeland, along the eastern shore of the large lake Randsfjorden, about 60 kilometres (37 mi) to the northwest of the capital city of Oslo.

Brandbu and its neighboring village of Jaren have grown together through conurbation, and Statistics Norway has considered them as one, single urban settlement for many years. The 5.7-square-kilometre (1,400-acre) village of Brandbu/Jaren has a population (2024) of 5,148 and a population density of 903 inhabitants per square kilometre (2,340/sq mi).

From the top of the 522-metre (1,713 ft) tall mountain Brandbukampen (originally a volcano from the Permian Period), there is a wide view of Brandbu and the villages surrounding it. The village of Egge lies at the base of the mountain, about 2 kilometres (1.2 mi) to the northwest of Brandbu.

Just by the center of Brandbu lies the Brandbu lower secondary school as well as the Brandbu campus of the Hadeland upper secondary school. The nearby Nes Church is the seat of the Brandbu parish within the Church of Norway. The church is located on the northern side of Røykenvik.

== History ==
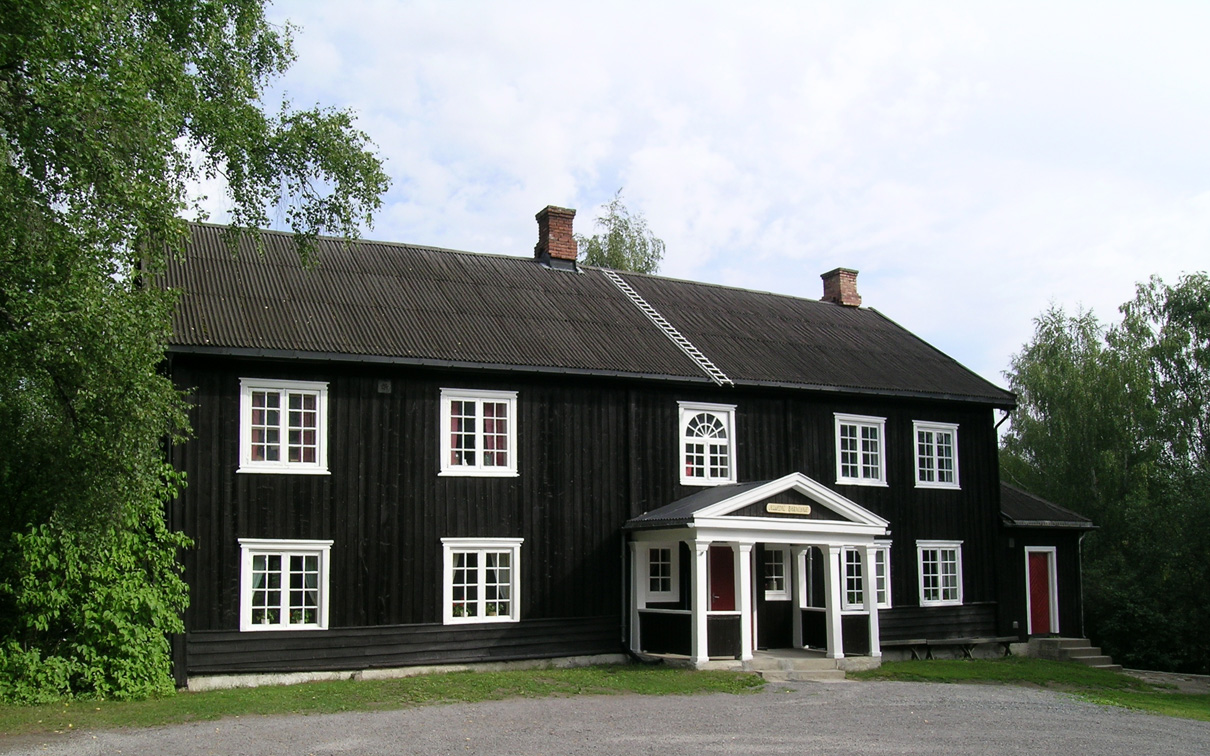
Augedal farm at Brandbu

Historically, the village of Brandbu was known as "Augedalsbro" (meaning Augedal bridge) since there was a bridge over the small river Vigga at the site. Locals still commonly refer to the village as "Brua" (meaning the bridge).

From 1897 until 1962, the village of Brandbu and its surrounding area were part of Brandbu Municipality.

The Røykenvikbanen railway line stopped at the Brandbu Station from 1900 to 1957 as it connected Røykenvik along the Randsfjorden to the main railway line. The station building has since been demolished.

=== Augedalsbro ===
The "Augedalsbro" or "Åvedalsbro" is an ancient place for a bridge that crossed the Augedalselva river (now known as the Vigga river). There was a lift station there in older times as well. This was where the old and new Bergensveien (Bergen road) met and Høgkorsveien (high cross road) went from here and over to Toten. Although the main bridge was moved to Rosendal, a little a bit further up river in the mid-1800s, Augedalsbro continued to be a lift station. The site was also the meeting place for the municipal council in the old Brandbu Municipality. The Old Molstad mill (Molstadkvern mølle) from 1915 which stood near the bridge is now a part of the Hadeland Folkemuseum.

Augedalsbro is also the motive for the painting Augedals bro by Gerhard Munthe (1897).
