= Oddny =

Oddny is a Norwegian and Icelandic feminine given name. Oddný is the variant of the name. It was produced from the combination of two words: oddr meaning “sharp point” and ný meaning “new”. People with the name include:

- Oddny Aleksandersen (born 1942), Norwegian politician
- Oddný Eir (born 1972), Icelandic writer
- Oddný G. Harðardóttir (born 1957), Icelandic politician
