= Finnmark County Municipality =

Regional governing administration for Finnmark county, Norway

Finnmark County Municipality Finnmark fylkeskommune Finnmárkku fylkkagielda Finmarkun fylkinkomuuni
- County
- Coat of arms

- Location in Norway
- Coordinates: 70.081382°N 29.73579°E
- Country: Norway
- Established: 1 Jan 1838
- Disestablished: 2020-2024
- Re-established: 1 Jan 2024
- Administrative center: Vadsø

Government
  - County mayor: Hans-Jacob Bønå
- ISO 3166 code: NO-56
- Website: Official website

Finnmark County Municipality (Finnmark fylkeskommune (Norwegian), Finnmárkku fylkkagielda (Northern Sami), Finmarkun fylkinkomuuni (Kven)) is the regional governing administration of Finnmark county in northern Norway. It was temporarily dissolved from 2020-2023 when Finnmark county was merged into Troms og Finnmark county, but that was undone effective 1 January 2024. The administration in the town of Vadsø and was led by a county council.

== County government ==
The county municipality's most important tasks include secondary education, recreation (sports and outdoor life), and cultural heritage. The county municipality is also responsible for all county roads (including ferry operations) and public transport (including school busses). The county municipality has further responsibility for regional land-use planning, business development, power production, and environmental management. The county also has responsibility for providing dental health services (in 2002, responsibility for hospitals and public medicine was transferred from the counties to the new regional health authorities).

=== County mayors ===
Since 1963, the county mayor (Norwegian: fylkesordfører) of Finnmark has been the political leader of the county and the chairperson of the county council. Prior to 1963, the County governor led the council which was made up of all of the mayors of the rural municipalities within the county. Here is a list of people who have held this position:

- 1964-1975: Henry Karlsen (Ap)
- 1975-1975: Axel Samuelsberg (Ap)
- 1976-1983: Arnulf Olsen (Ap)
- 1984-1987: Helmer Mikkelsen (Ap)
- 1986-1987: Oddny Aleksandersen - acting (Ap)
- 1988-1995: Erling Fløtten (Ap)
- 1995-2003: Evy-Ann Midttun (Ap)
- 2003-2005: Helga Pedersen (Ap)
- 2005-2007: Kirsti Saxi (SV)
- 2007-2015: Runar Sjåstad (Ap)
- 2015-2019: Ragnhild Vassvik Kalstad (Ap)
- (2020-2023: none - Finnmark was part of the Troms og Finnmark County Municipality)
- 2024-present: Kristina Torbergsen (Ap)

=== County council ===
The county council (Norwegian: Fylkestinget) is made up of 35 representatives that are elected by direct election by all legal residents of the county every fourth year. The council is the legislative body for the county. The county council typically meets about six times a year. Council members are divided into standing committees and an executive committee (fylkesutvalg), which meet considerably more often.

Both the council and executive committee (with at least 5 members) are led by the county mayor (Norwegian: fylkesordfører). The executive committee carries out the executive funitons of the county under the direction of the whole council. The tables below show the current and historical composition of the council by political party.

Finnmark fylkesting 2024–2027
Party name (in Norwegian)	Number of representatives
Labour Party (Arbeiderpartiet)	8
Progress Party (Fremskrittspartiet)	4
Green Party (Miljøpartiet De Grønne)	1
Conservative Party (Høyre)	4
Industry and Business Party (Industri‑ og Næringspartiet)	1
Christian Democratic Party (Kristelig Folkeparti)	1
Nordkalottfolket Party (Nordkalottfolket)	7
Red Party (Rødt)	2
Centre Party (Senterpartiet)	2
Socialist Left Party (Sosialistisk Venstreparti)	2
Liberal Party (Venstre)	1
Sámi List (Samelista)	2
Total number of members:	35
Note: From 2020-2024, Troms county was part of Troms og Finnmark county.

Finnmark fylkesting 2015–2019
Party name (in Norwegian)	Number of representatives
Labour Party (Arbeiderpartiet)	17
Progress Party (Fremskrittspartiet)	4
Green Party (Miljøpartiet De Grønne)	1
Conservative Party (Høyre)	5
Christian Democratic Party (Kristelig Folkeparti)	1
Coastal Party (Kystpartiet)	1
Centre Party (Senterpartiet)	2
Socialist Left Party (Sosialistisk Venstreparti)	2
Liberal Party (Venstre)	2
Total number of members:	35
Note: From 2020-2024, Troms county was part of Troms og Finnmark county.

Finnmark fylkesting 2011–2015
Party name (in Norwegian)	Number of representatives
Labour Party (Arbeiderpartiet)	15
Progress Party (Fremskrittspartiet)	4
Conservative Party (Høyre)	7
Christian Democratic Party (Kristelig Folkeparti)	1
Coastal Party (Kystpartiet)	2
Sámi People's Party (Samefolkets Parti)	1
Centre Party (Senterpartiet)	1
Socialist Left Party (Sosialistisk Venstreparti)	2
Liberal Party (Venstre)	2
Total number of members:	35

Finnmark fylkesting 2007–2011
Party name (in Norwegian)	Number of representatives
Labour Party (Arbeiderpartiet)	15
Progress Party (Fremskrittspartiet)	6
Conservative Party (Høyre)	4
Christian Democratic Party (Kristelig Folkeparti)	1
Coastal Party (Kystpartiet)	1
Sámi People's Party (Samefolkets Parti)	1
Centre Party (Senterpartiet)	2
Socialist Left Party (Sosialistisk Venstreparti)	4
Liberal Party (Venstre)	1
Total number of members:	35

Finnmark fylkesting 2003–2007
Party name (in Norwegian)	Number of representatives
Labour Party (Arbeiderpartiet)	14
Progress Party (Fremskrittspartiet)	4
Conservative Party (Høyre)	5
Christian Democratic Party (Kristelig Folkeparti)	1
Coastal Party (Kystpartiet)	1
Sámi People's Party (Samefolkets Parti)	2
Centre Party (Senterpartiet)	2
Socialist Left Party (Sosialistisk Venstreparti)	5
Liberal Party (Venstre)	1
Total number of members:	35

Finnmark fylkesting 1999–2003
Party name (in Norwegian)	Number of representatives
Labour Party (Arbeiderpartiet)	11
Progress Party (Fremskrittspartiet)	4
Conservative Party (Høyre)	8
Christian Democratic Party (Kristelig Folkeparti)	2
Coastal Party (Kystpartiet)	1
Sámi People's Party (Samefolkets Parti)	1
Centre Party (Senterpartiet)	2
Socialist Left Party (Sosialistisk Venstreparti)	4
Liberal Party (Venstre)	1
Joint list of the Red Electoral Alliance (Rød Valgallianse) and the Communist Party (Kommunistiske Parti)	1
Total number of members:	35

Finnmark fylkesting 1995–1999
Party name (in Norwegian)	Number of representatives
Labour Party (Arbeiderpartiet)	14
Progress Party (Fremskrittspartiet)	1
Conservative Party (Høyre)	6
Christian Democratic Party (Kristelig Folkeparti)	2
Sámi People's List (Samefolkets liste)	1
Centre Party (Senterpartiet)	4
Socialist Left Party (Sosialistisk Venstreparti)	4
Liberal Party (Venstre)	3
Total number of members:	35

Finnmark fylkesting 1991–1995
Party name (in Norwegian)	Number of representatives
Labour Party (Arbeiderpartiet)	14
Progress Party (Fremskrittspartiet)	1
Conservative Party (Høyre)	6
Christian Democratic Party (Kristelig Folkeparti)	2
Sámi People's List (Samefolkets liste)	1
Centre Party (Senterpartiet)	3
Socialist Left Party (Sosialistisk Venstreparti)	7
Liberal Party (Venstre)	1
Total number of members:	35

Finnmark fylkesting 1987–1991
Party name (in Norwegian)	Number of representatives
Labour Party (Arbeiderpartiet)	18
Progress Party (Fremskrittspartiet)	2
Conservative Party (Høyre)	6
Communist Party (Kommunistiske Parti)	1
Christian Democratic Party (Kristelig Folkeparti)	2
Centre Party (Senterpartiet)	1
Socialist Left Party (Sosialistisk Venstreparti)	3
Liberal Party (Venstre)	2
Total number of members:	35

Finnmark fylkesting 1983–1987
Party name (in Norwegian)	Number of representatives
Labour Party (Arbeiderpartiet)	19
Progress Party (Fremskrittspartiet)	1
Conservative Party (Høyre)	6
Communist Party (Kommunistiske Parti)	1
Christian Democratic Party (Kristelig Folkeparti)	2
Sámi People's List (Samefolkets liste)	1
Centre Party (Senterpartiet)	1
Socialist Left Party (Sosialistisk Venstreparti)	3
Liberal Party (Venstre)	1
Total number of members:	35

Finnmark fylkesting 1979–1983
Party name (in Norwegian)	Number of representatives
Labour Party (Arbeiderpartiet)	16
Conservative Party (Høyre)	8
Communist Party (Kommunistiske Parti)	1
Christian Democratic Party (Kristelig Folkeparti)	3
Sámi People's List (Samefolkets liste)	1
Centre Party (Senterpartiet)	2
Socialist Left Party (Sosialistisk Venstreparti)	2
Liberal Party (Venstre)	2
Total number of members:	35

Finnmark fylkesting 1975–1979
Party name (in Norwegian)	Number of representatives
Labour Party (Arbeiderpartiet)	18
Conservative Party (Høyre)	6
Christian Democratic Party (Kristelig Folkeparti)	3
Sámi People's List (Samefolkets liste)	1
Centre Party (Senterpartiet)	2
Socialist Left Party (Sosialistisk Venstreparti)	4
Liberal Party (Venstre)	1
Total number of members:	35
Note: Prior to 1975, the county councils were not directly elected. Instead, members were chosen by each municipal council within the county - oftentimes it was the municipal mayors who were selected to be on the county council.
