= Hadeland =

Coordinates: 60°14′20″N 10°23′47″E

- District
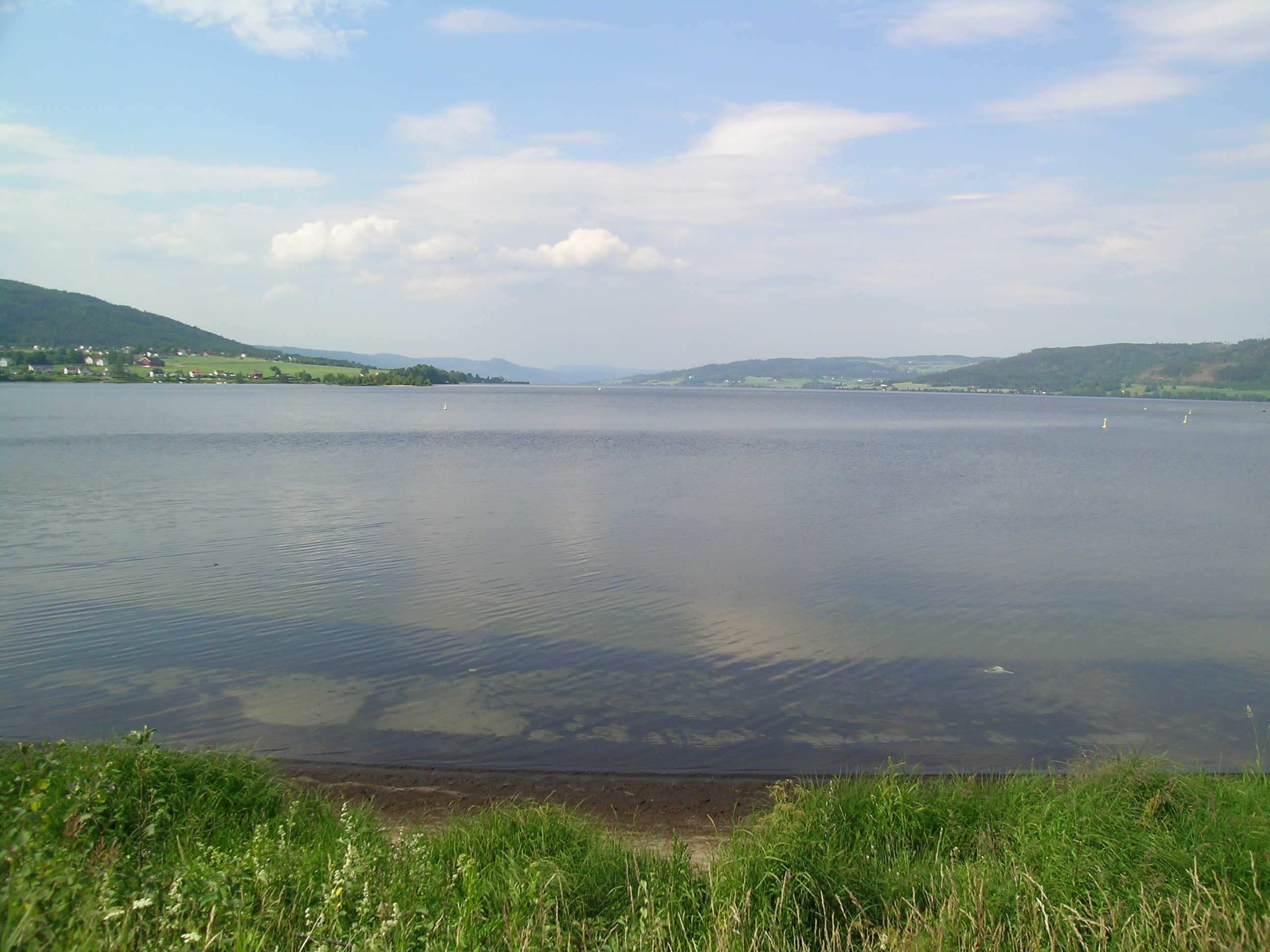
- Randsfjorden, seen northwards from Jevnaker.
- Country: Norway
- County: Innlandet and Akershus
- Region: Austlandet
- Urban Center: Jaren

Area
  - Total: 1,274 km^{2} (492 sq mi)

Population (2021)
  - Total: 29,540
  - Density: 23.19/km^{2} (60.05/sq mi)
- Demonym: Hadelending

Hadeland (locally [ˈhɑːlæn]) is a traditional district in the southeastern part of Norway. It is centered on the southern part of the large lake Randsfjorden in Innlandet and Akershus counties. The district consists of Gran Municipality in Innlandet county and Jevnaker Municipality and Lunner Municipality in Akershus county. Hadeland occupies the area north of the hills of Nordmarka close to the Norwegian capital Oslo. The soil around the Randsfjorden is amongst the most fertile in Norway. Hadeland accounts for just 5% of the country's area, but it represents 13% of its agricultural land. Farmers harvest grains and potatoes. Pigs, dairy cattle, and horses are also bred at farms there.

Jevnaker is located to the southern and western side of the Randsfjorden. Gran's rolling countryside is home to about two-thirds of the nearly 30,000 people living in Hadeland. The village of Gran serves as the area's main center of commerce. The municipality of Gran is divided by the Randsfjorden, and its western part is known as the Fjorda district.

The Hadeland area includes large stretches of woodlands. About 70% of Lunner is covered by forest. Nearly half of the wooded area in Lunner and Jevnaker is common land (almenning). The local forestry cooperative plays a key role in the economies of the two areas. Their woods are home to a variety of flora and fauna, and host a number of species of birds, deer, moose, and other wildlife. Populations of trout, char, bass, and other freshwater fish have dwindled in the inland lakes and streams, but restocking efforts are now made.

== Etymology ==
The name of Hadeland comes from the Old Norse name for the inhabitants, haðar, which is assumed to be connected to war. The name would then mean "the land of the warriors."

== History ==
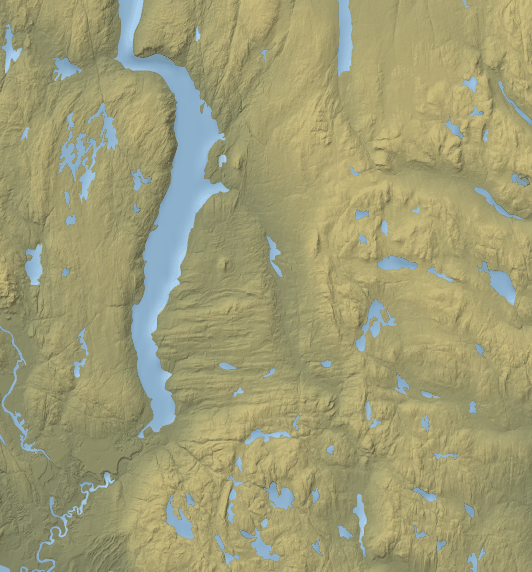
Terrain map of Hadeland and its largest settlements. Note that Skrukkelia was part of Hadeland until 1841.

A number of Stone Age sites have been discovered around the Randsfjorden and over 200 artifacts - including jewelry, tools, and weapons - have been unearthed. During this period the people here, as in most of southern Norway, lived as hunter-gatherers, exploiting the resources of the large forests.

By the end of the Bronze Age, agriculture had evolved and archaeological evidence points to the division of land into family or clan-based farms. Several Bronze Age burial mounds have been identified in Hadeland.

Roman references to this area as Hadeland may be found in documents dating from AD200-400. The name refers to the haðar people. It is thought that haðar may relate to one of the many tribes or clans in the area, thus Hadeland would mean land of the haðar. Archaeologists have found a wide variety of weapons in Iron Age burial sites throughout Hadeland. In the late Iron Age, Hadeland was a petty kingdom. One of the more prominent kings of Hadeland was Halfdan Hvitbeinn who lived in the 8th century.

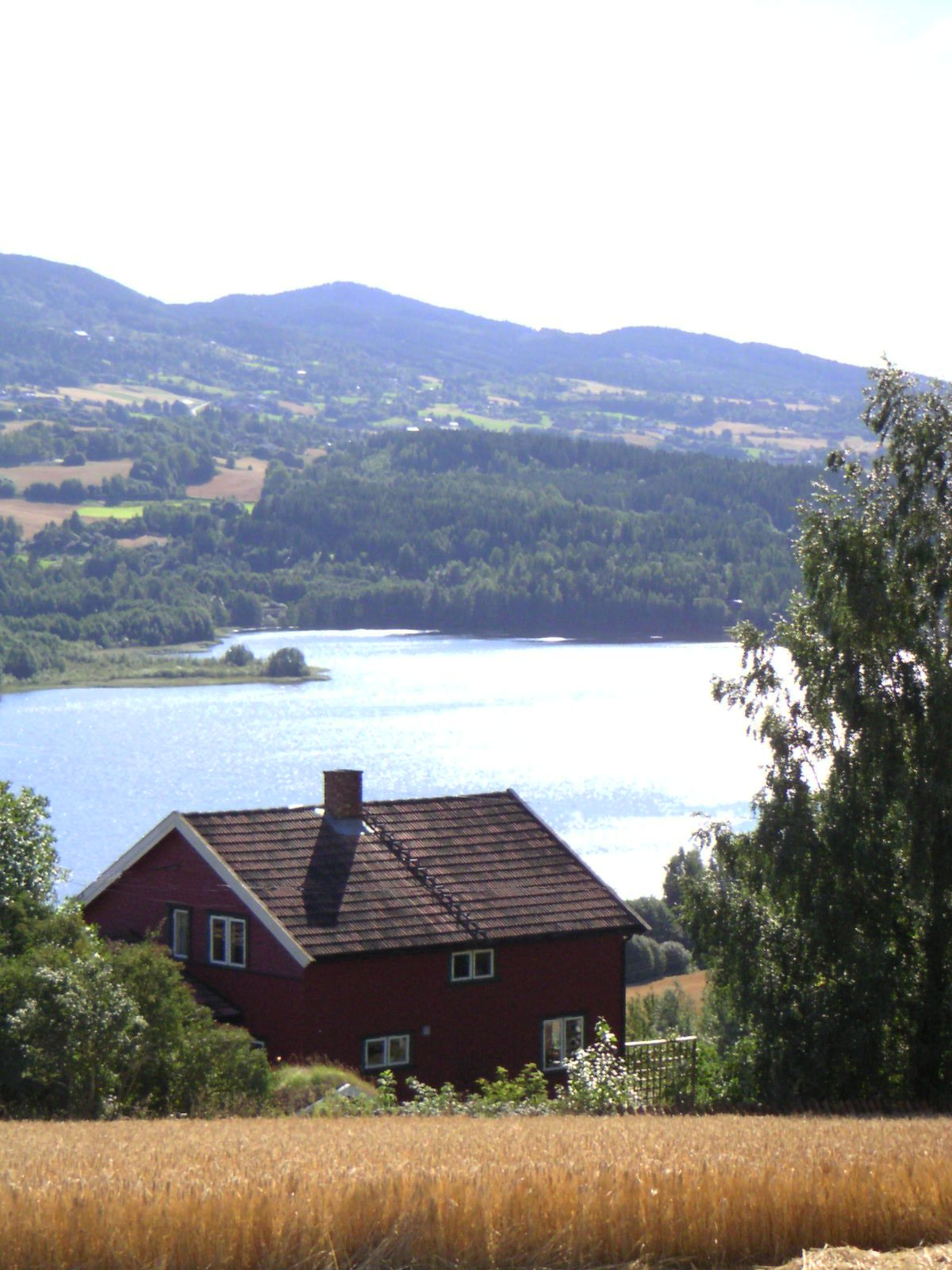
View over Jarenvatnet, a small lake in Gran Municipality.

According to the Icelandic sagas early Viking Age chieftains enjoyed hunting and entertaining their entourages in the forests and on the lakes in this area. King Halfdan the Black, father of king Harald Fairhair who united Norway, often visited Hadeland. According to historical sources he and his men attended a banquet here in the winter of 860. As they were crossing the ice on Randsfjorden on their way home to Ringerike, the ice gave way and horses, men, and the 40-year-old king himself drowned. The Hadeland Folkemuseum is built around a Viking burial mound at Granavollen which according to folklore contains the torso of King Halvdan.

The name Hadeland appears on the Dynna stone, a runestone from about 1040-1050. Norway formally adopted Christianity in 1030, and the Dynna stone, with its scenes from the Nativity is one of the first Christian monuments in Norway. A number of medieval churches survive in Hadeland. Notable among them is the Old Tingelstad Church. This was built in the 13th century. Other churches include Lunner Church and the Sister Churches at Granavollen. The Black Death arrived in Norway in the mid 14th century, and it is estimated that two-thirds of the population of Hadeland was wiped out.

== Attractions ==
- The Sister Churches
- Granavollen Runestone
- The Dynna stone
- Hadeland Glassverk
- Hadeland Folkemuseum
- Lunner Church
- Old Tingelstad Church
- Harestua Solar Observatory
