= Willy Pedersen (politician) =

Norwegian politician

Willy Andreas Pedersen (born 1 November 1981) is a Norwegian politician for the Labour Party.

He served as a deputy representative to the Parliament of Norway from Finnmark during the term 2009–2013. In total he met during 195 days of parliamentary session. At the end of his term, he held the status of regular representative while Helga Pedersen was a member of Stoltenberg's Second Cabinet. He has been deputy mayor of Vadsø Municipality.
