= Mariakirken =

Mariakirken may refer to any of four Norwegian churches:

- St Mary's Church, Bergen (Mariakirken i Bergen)
- St Mary's Church, Oslo (Mariakirken i Oslo)
- St Mary's Church, Lillehammer (Mariakirken på Lillehammer)
- St Mary's Church, Gran (Mariakirken på Gran)

== See also ==
- St. Mary's Church (disambiguation)
