= Evy-Ann Midttun =

Norwegian politician

Evy-Ann Midttun (1943–2011) was a Norwegian politician for the Labour Party.

She started her political career in Alta Municipality, and was a county councillor (fylkesråd) in Finnmark County Municipality from 1988 to 1995. From 1995 to 2003 she was the county mayor (fylkesordfører) of Finnmark. She died in 2011.

Political offices
Preceded by Erling Fløtten	County mayor of Finnmark; 1995–2003	Succeeded by Helga Pedersen
