= Granavollen stone =

Coordinates: 60.3667°N 10.5293°E

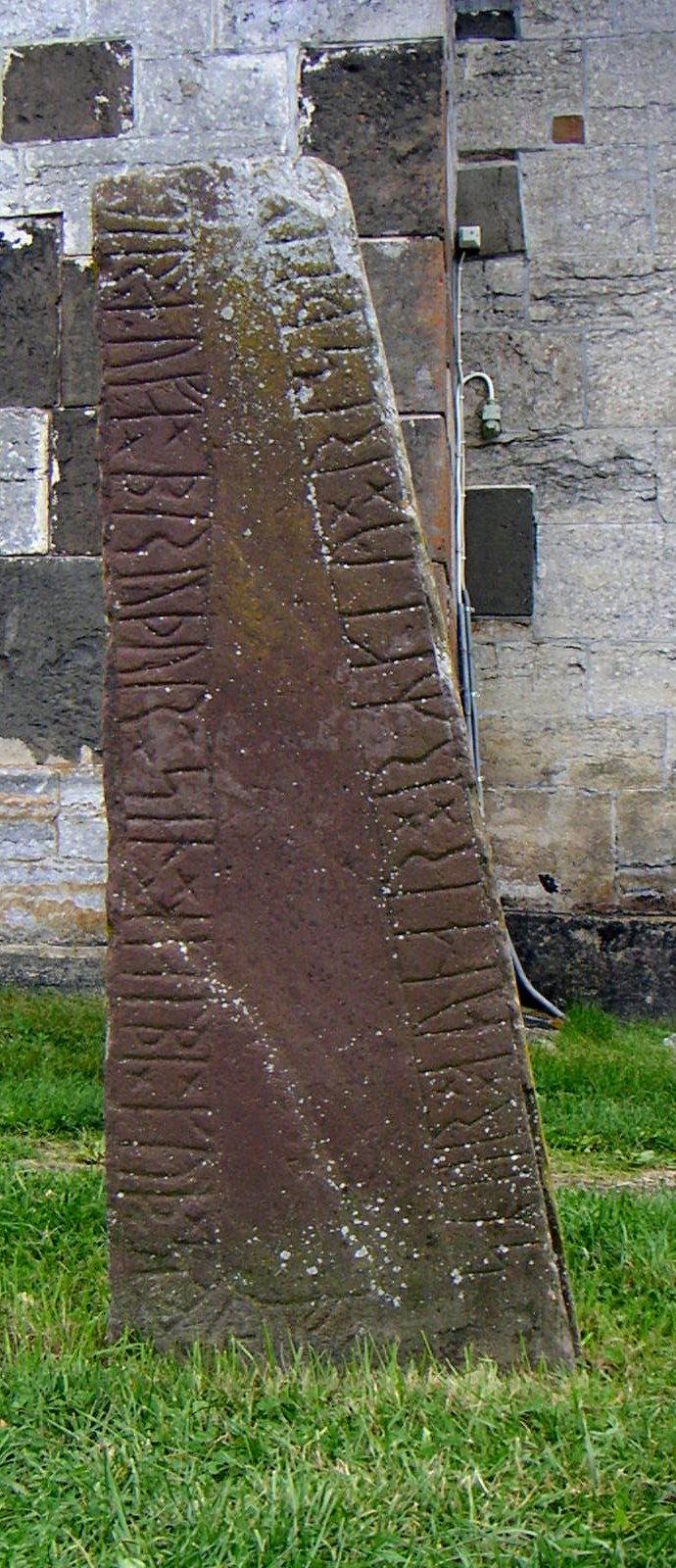
- Created: 11th century
- Discovered: Gran Municipality, Innlandet, Norway
- Rundata ID: N 63
- Runemaster: Unknown

The Granavollen stone is a runestone located behind Nikolaikirken at Granavollen in Gran Municipality in Innlandet county, Norway. This church is also known as one of the two medieval Sister Churches. The inscription is classified as being carved in runestone style RAK, which is the oldest style. This classification is used for those inscriptions where the ends of the runic text bands are straight and do not have any animal or serpent heads attached.

The runic text is dated as being from the last half of the eleventh century and reveals that the stone was erected in memory of a brother named Aufi. The text ends in a prayer for Aufi's sál, or soul, a word which was not used until after Christianization.

== Inscription ==
× cʀnir ⁑ aunar ⁑ rʀkiu ⁑ ricþtu [⁑] …(f)tir ⁑ aufa ⁑ bruþur ⁑ cin ⁑ hialbi ⁑ kuþ × col × aufa
{} Synir {} Aunar {} Ryggju/Rœkju {} reistu {} [e]ptir {} <aufa>, {} bróður {} sinn. {} Hjalpi {} Guð {} sál {} <aufa>.
Aun Ryggja's/Rœkja's sons raised in memory of <aufa>, their brother. May God help <aufa>'s soul.

== See also ==
- The Dynna stone
