= Nils Olav Totland =

Norwegian politician

Minister of Labour and Administration
- In office 7 October 1993 – 25 October 1996
- Prime Minister: Gro Harlem Brundtland
- Preceded by: Oddny Aleksandersen
- Succeeded by: Terje Rød-Larsen

Personal details
- Born: 17 December 1935 (age 90) Bergen, Hordaland, Norway
- Party: Labour

Nils Olav Totland (born 17 December 1935) is a Norwegian politician for the Labour Party.

He was Minister of Administration from October 1993 to October 1996, in the third cabinet Brundtland. On the local level, he was a member of Skedsmo municipal council from 1967 to 1982 and Fet municipal council from 1999 to 2003. He chaired the local party chapter in Fet from 2001 to 2007.

Outside politics, he had a career in the Norwegian State Railways from 1952 to 1971. He then became a full-time trade unionist. He was a member of the secretariat of the Norwegian Confederation of Trade Unions from 1982 to 1990, while chairing Statstjenestemannskartellet. From 1990 to 1993 he was secretary of Arbeidernes Opplysningsforbund. He was a member of the Labour Party central committee from 1987 to 1995.

He was a member of the board of Rikshospitalet from 1988 to 1993, Norsk Film A/S from 1991 to 1993, Den Norske Bank from 1992 to 1993 and the Norwegian Labour Inspection Authority from 1997 to 2000.

Political offices
Preceded by Oddny Aleksandersen	Minister of Administration; 1993–1996	Succeeded by Sylvia Brustad (acting)
