= Kirsti Saxi =

Norwegian politician (born 1953)

Kirsti Saxi (born 1 December 1953) is a Norwegian politician for the Socialist Left Party.

She served as a deputy representative to the Storting from Finnmark between 1997 and 2009.

Following the 2003 election, Saxi became the new deputy county mayor (fylkesvaraordfører) of Finnmark. When the county mayor Helga Pedersen left to join the national cabinet, Saxi became county mayor (fylkesordfører). She lost the position following the 2007 election.

Preceded by Helga Pedersen	County mayor of Finnmark; 2005–2007	Succeeded by Runar Sjåstad
