= Arnulf Olsen =

Norwegian politician (1928–2021)

Arnulf Sigfred Olsen (13 October 1928 – 24 February 2021) was a Norwegian politician for the Labour Party.

Hailing from Hammerfest, he was a member of Finnmark county council from 1975 to 1983. During the entire period he served as county mayor. He was also mayor of Hammerfest in 1975–1979 and 1983–1987.

Arnulf Olsen died on 24 February 2021, at the age of 92.

== Bibliography ==
- Bottolfsen, Øystein (1990). Finnmark fylkeskommunes historie 1840-1990. Vadsø: Finnmark county municipality. ISBN 82-991380-5-1.

Preceded by Axel Samuelsberg	County mayor of Finnmark; 1975–1983	Succeeded by Helmer Mikkelsen
