= Helmer Mikkelsen =

Norwegian politician (1930–1989)

Helmer Mikkelsen (26 September 1930 – 19 June 1989) was a Norwegian politician for the Labour Party.

He was born in Børselv, and was the mayor of Porsanger Municipality from 1967 to 1975. He was a member of Finnmark county council from 1975 to 1987. During the last term, he served as county mayor. From May 1986 to April 1987, he was ill, and Oddny Aleksandersen took over as acting county mayor.

He was also a deputy board member of Ságat from 1988 to 1989. He died in 1989.

Political offices
Preceded by Arnulf Olsen	County mayor of Finnmark; 1983–1987 (Oddny Aleksandersen was acting 1986–1987)	Succeeded by Erling Fløtten
