= Oddny Aleksandersen =

Norwegian politician

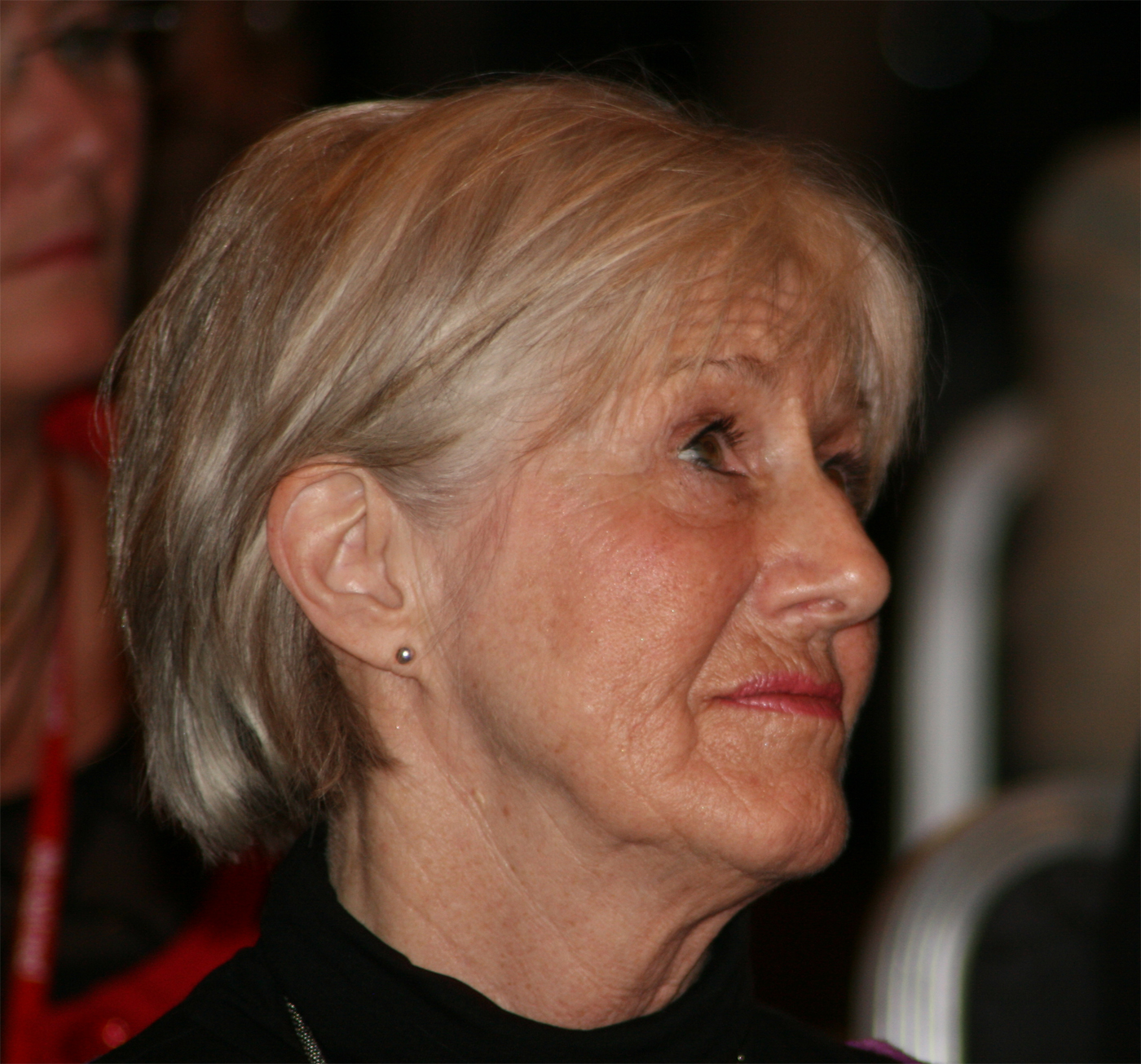
- Aleksandersen in 2009.

Minister of Labour and Administration
- In office 4 September 1992 – 7 October 1993
- Prime Minister: Gro Harlem Brundtland
- Preceded by: Tove S. Gerhardsen
- Succeeded by: Nils Totland

Personal details
- Born: 5 February 1942 (age 84) Vadsø, Norway
- Party: Labour

Oddny Ballo Aleksandersen (born 5 February 1942), is a Norwegian politician for the Labour Party.

Born in Vadsø, she chaired the local party chapter in Vadsø from 1979 to 1982 and was a member of the executive committee of the municipal council of Vadsø Municipality from 1979 to 1983. Elected to the county council in 1983, she served as deputy county mayor for one term, and acting county mayor from May 1986 to April 1987, during the illness of county mayor Helmer Mikkelsen.

On the national level, she served briefly as personal secretary (today known as political advisor) in the Ministry of Justice and the Police in 1981. She was later Minister of Government Administration and Labour from September 1992 to October 1993, in the third cabinet Brundtland. She was the third woman in a row to hold this position; the first man to be Minister of Government Administration was Nils Olav Totland, who succeeded Aleksandersen in 1993.

Outside politics she took her education here and there, at Nesna University College, University of Trondheim and University of Tromsø, finally taking the cand.mag. degree in 1996. She has worked as a school teacher in Sør-Varanger Municipality and Vadsø Municipality from 1968 to 1972 and 1982 to 1984, as a secretary in the Norwegian Broadcasting Corporation from 1972 to 1979, as a consultant in Finnmark County Municipality from 1980 to 1982 and in the administrative department of the University of Tromsø from 1990 to 2007.

She has been a member of the board of the Norwegian Association of Local and Regional Authorities from 1983 to 1987, the Norwegian Meteorological Institute from 1986 to 1990, Det Norske Luftfartselskap from 1987 to 1988, the Norwegian Petroleum Directorate from 1989 to 1992, the Norwegian Broadcasting Corporation in 1992 and the Norwegian Institute for Urban and Regional Research from 1996 to 2000.

Political offices
Preceded by Tove Strand Gerhardsen	Norwegian Minister of Government Administration and Labour; 1992–1993	Succeeded by Nils Olav Totland
