= Runar Sjåstad =

Norwegian politician (born 1968)

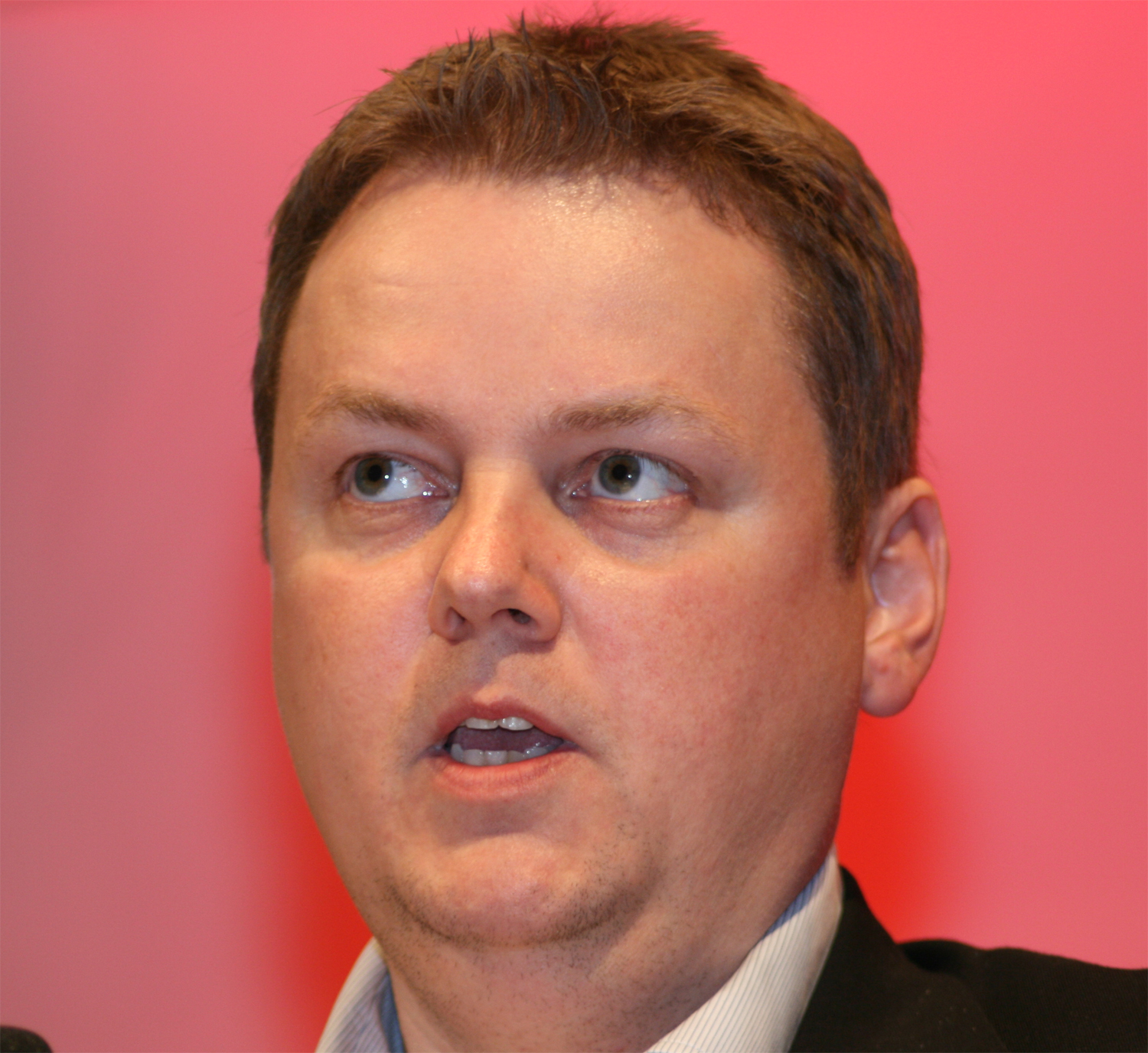

Member of the Storting
- Incumbent
- Assumed office 1 October 2017
- Constituency: Finnmark

Deputy Member of the Storting
- In office 1 October 2001 – 30 September 2017
- Constituency: Finnmark

County Mayor of Finnmark
- In office 22 October 2007 – 25 October 2017
- Deputy: Ann-Solveig Sørensen; Bente Haug; Ragnhild Vassvik Kalstad
- Preceded by: Kirsti Saxi
- Succeeded by: Ragnhild Vassvik Kalstad

Personal details
- Born: 28 August 1968 (age 57)
- Political party: Labour
- Children: 3

Runar Sjåstad (born 28 August 1968) is a Norwegian politician for the Labour Party. He currently serves as a member of parliament for Finnmark since 2017 and was previously a deputy member between 2001 and 2017. He also served as county mayor of Finnmark between 2007 and 2017.

== Political career ==
=== Parliament ===
He served as a deputy representative from Finnmark between 2001 and 2017, having been re-elected in 2005, 2009 and 2013. He was elected as a regular representative from Finnmark in 2017 and was re-elected in 2021.

In parliament, he served as Secretary to the Storting Presidency between 2017 and 2021. He concurrently sat on the Standing Committee on Energy and the Environment. Currently he sits on the Preparatory Credentials Committee and sat on the Standing Committee on Labour and Social Affairs between 2021 and 2023. From 2023 he sits on the Standing Committee on Business and Industry.

=== Local politics ===
In the 2007 elections he was elected as the county mayor of Finnmark. He was re-elected in 2011 and 2015. He resigned in 2017 when he was elected to parliament and was succeeded by his deputy, Ragnhild Vassvik Kalstad.

== Personal life ==
Sjåstad is married and has three children. He and his family reside in Vadsø Municipality.

Political offices
Preceded by Kirsti Saxi	County Mayor of Finnmark; 2007–2017	Succeeded by Ragnhild Vassvik Kalstad
