= Granavollen =

Village in Gran Municipality, Norway

Granavollen Granvollen
- Village
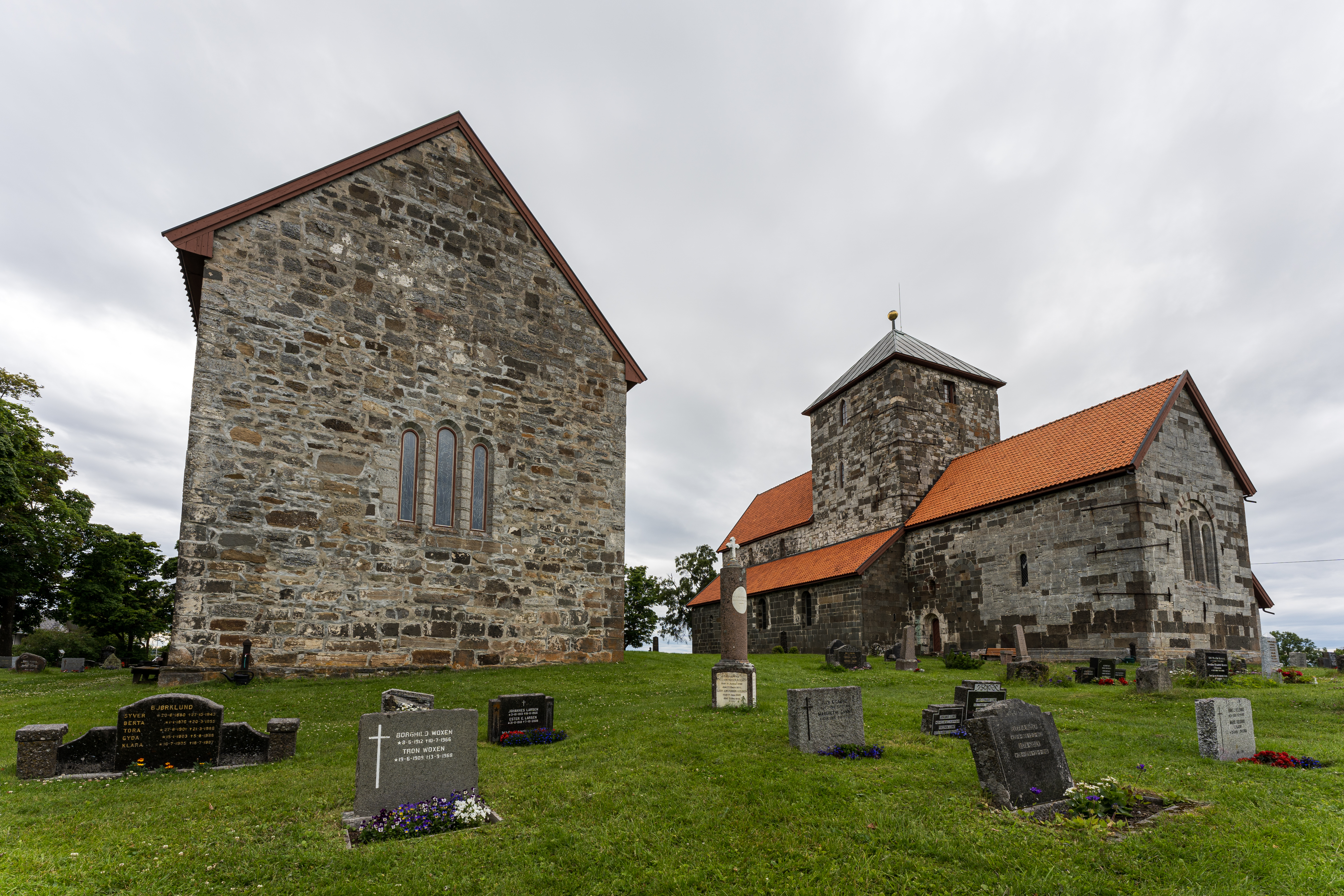
- View of the two medieval churches in Granavollen
- Interactive map of Granavollen
- Location within Innlandet Location within Norway
- Coordinates: 60.36682°N 10.52861°E
- Country: Norway
- Region: Eastern Norway
- County: Innlandet
- District: Hadeland
- Municipality: Gran Municipality
- Elevation: 346 m (1,135 ft)
- Time zone: UTC+01:00 (CET)
  - Summer (DST): UTC+02:00 (CEST)
- Post Code: 2750 Gran

Granavollen is a small village in Gran Municipality in Innlandet county, Norway. The village lies about 2 kilometres (1.2 mi) to the northwest of the larger village of Gran and about 3.5 kilometres (2.2 mi) to the southwest of Jaren.

Granavollen is famed for the Sister Churches which are a pair of 12th century grey stone long churches, as well as the Norse runestone carvings.

== See also ==
- Granavollen stone
