= Lunner Church =

Church in Lunner, Akershus, Norway

Coordinates: 60°18′27″N 10°33′26″E

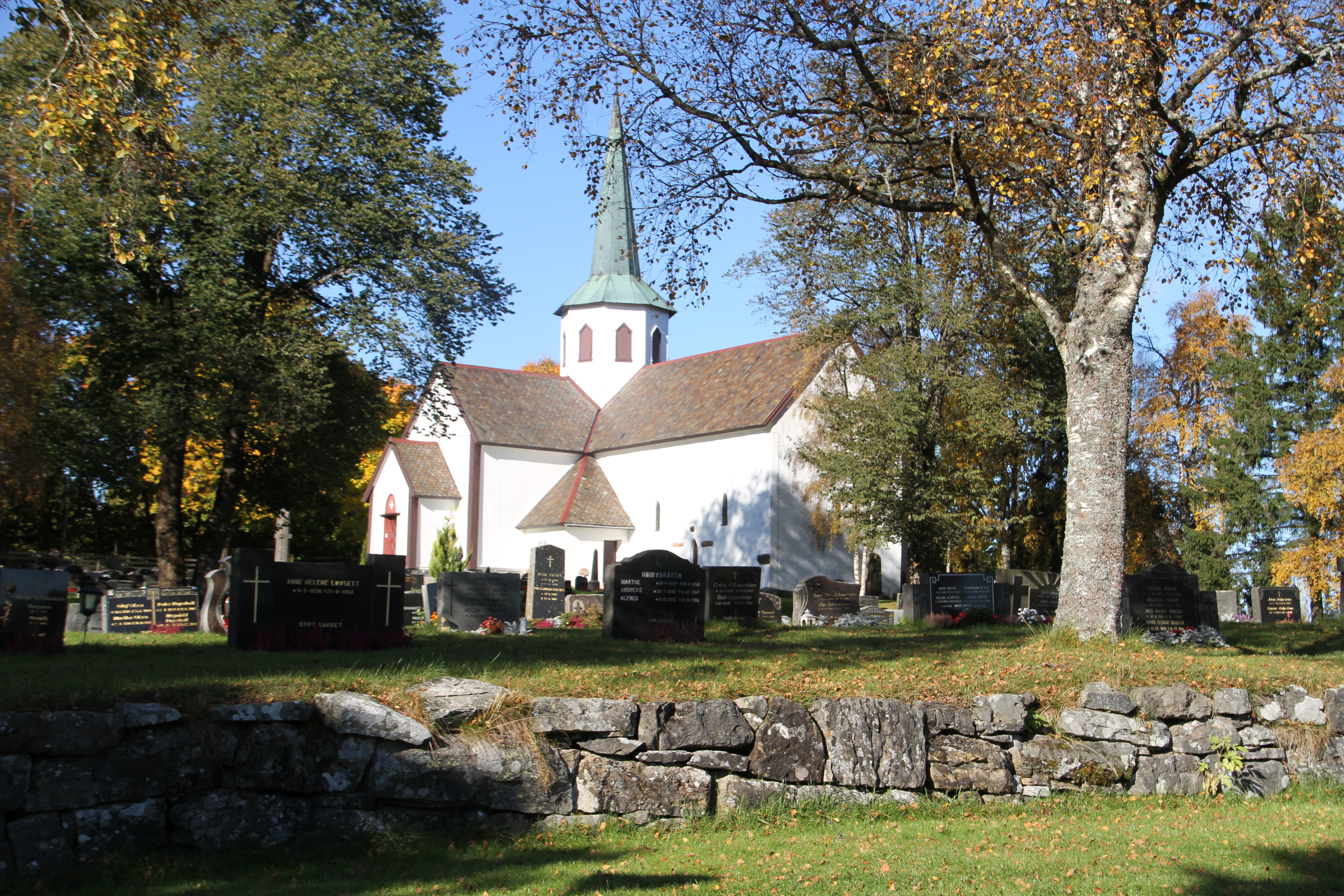
Lunner church

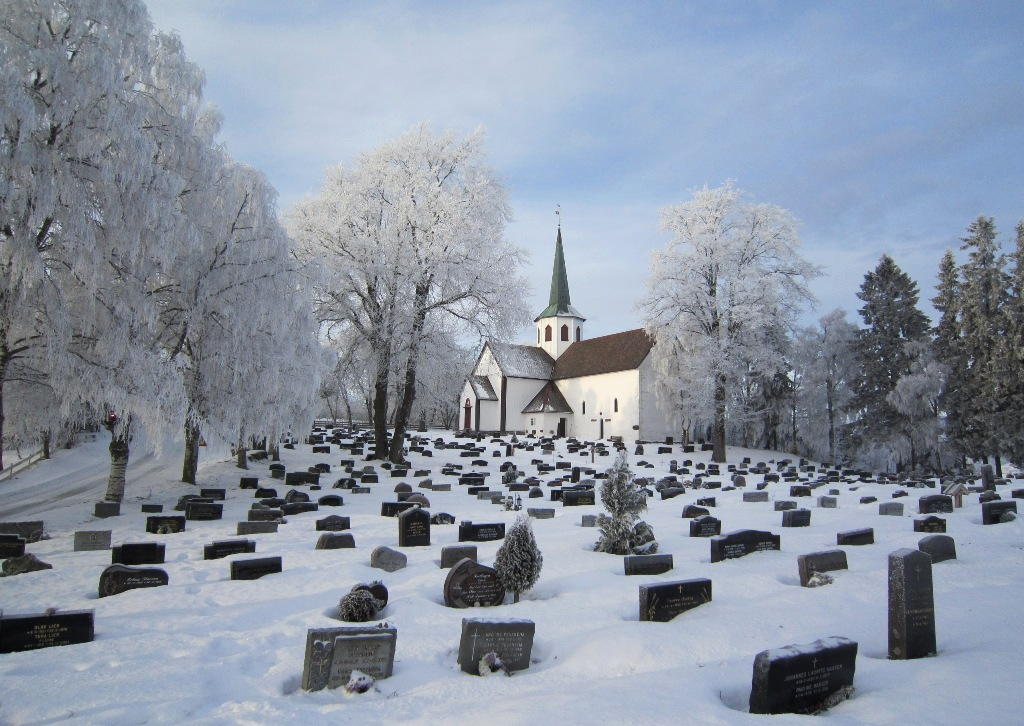
Lunner church cemetery

Lunner Church (Norwegian: Lunner kirke) is a medieval era stone church in Lunner municipality of Akershus county, Norway. The church dates from the 12th century. It is located on the hill of Lunnertoppen in the traditional district of Hadeland.

== Description ==
Lunner Church was originally a long Romanesque church with a circular stone tower at the west side. Sometime between 1780 and 1790, the tower was dismantled and the church rebuilt into a cruciform church. The newer parts in wood underwent restoration work in 1987 and 1988. An archaeological excavation was carried out and the circular base of the old tower was recorded and left open for public display. Lunner Church is the only known circular church tower in Norway. Over the circular base of the tower a new floor of glass was made so visitors of the church now can see this remarkable construction.

The medieval church now constitutes the choir of today's church. The medieval parts of the church have still not gone through restoration. On the outside the medieval part of the church has nine stone reliefs. These ornaments depict humans and animals, probably battling for human souls. The ornaments are located on the southern and eastbound walls and on the sacristy.

== Gallery of stone reliefs ==
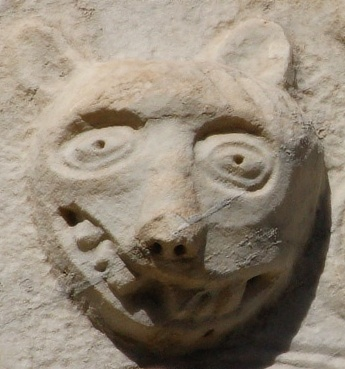

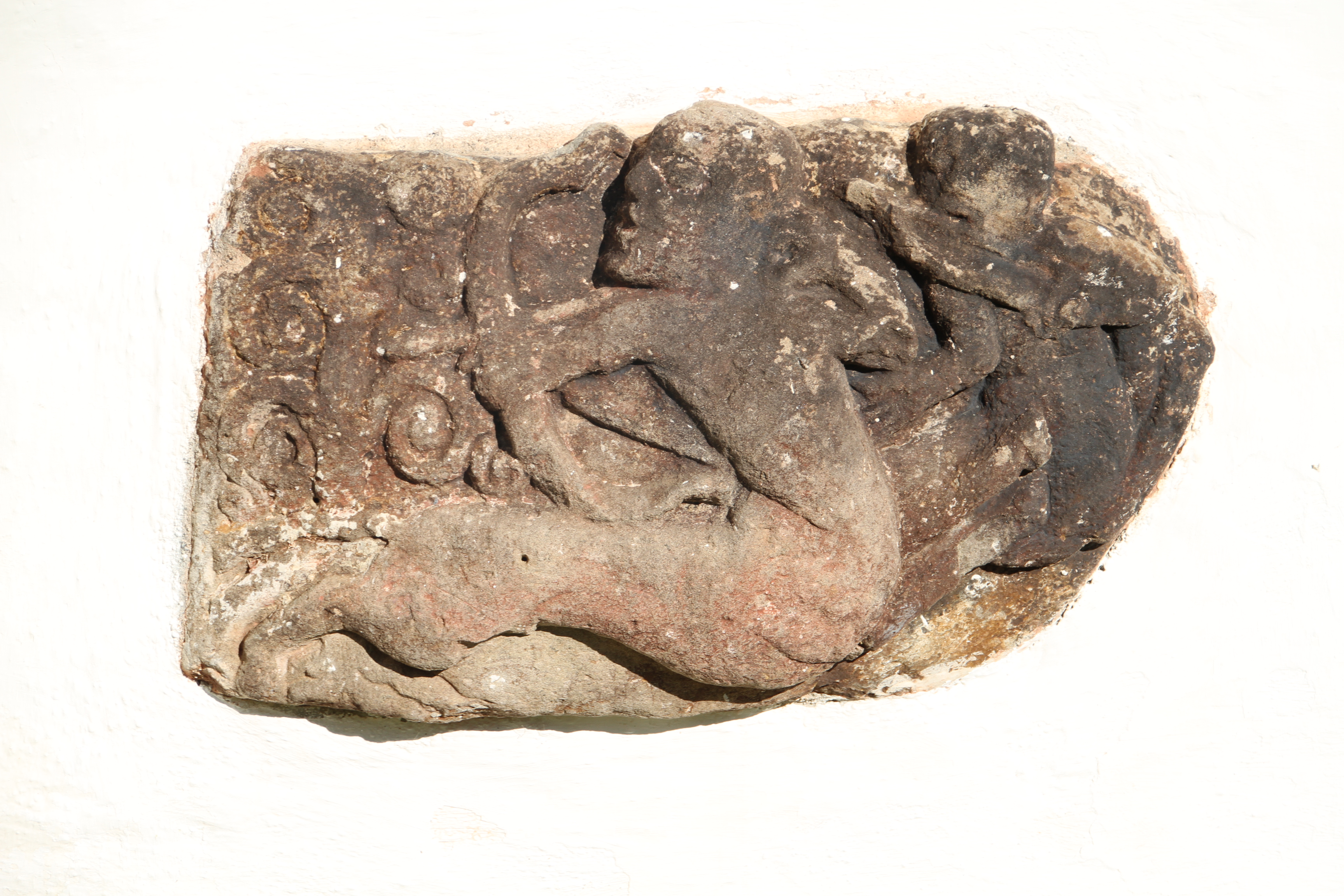

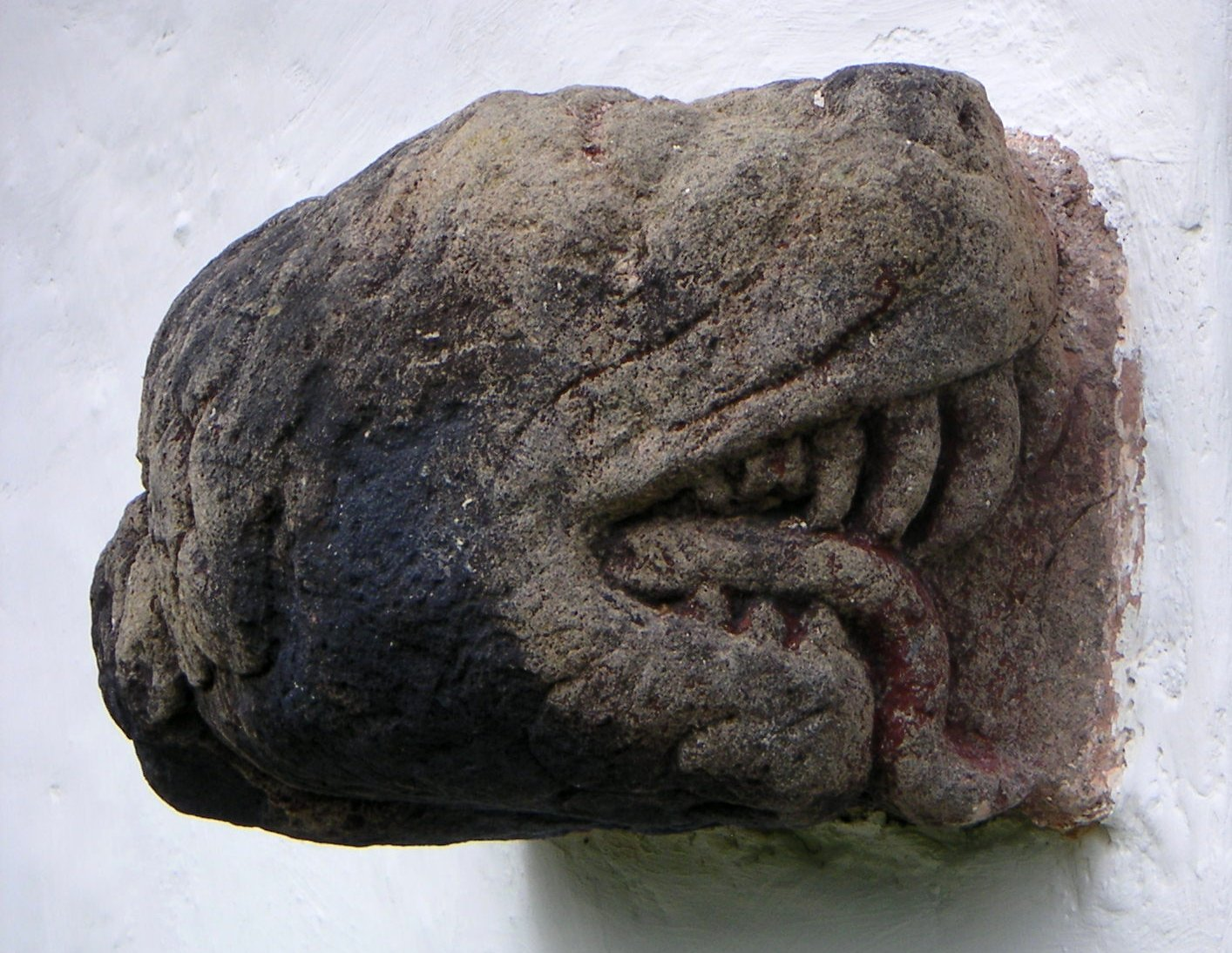

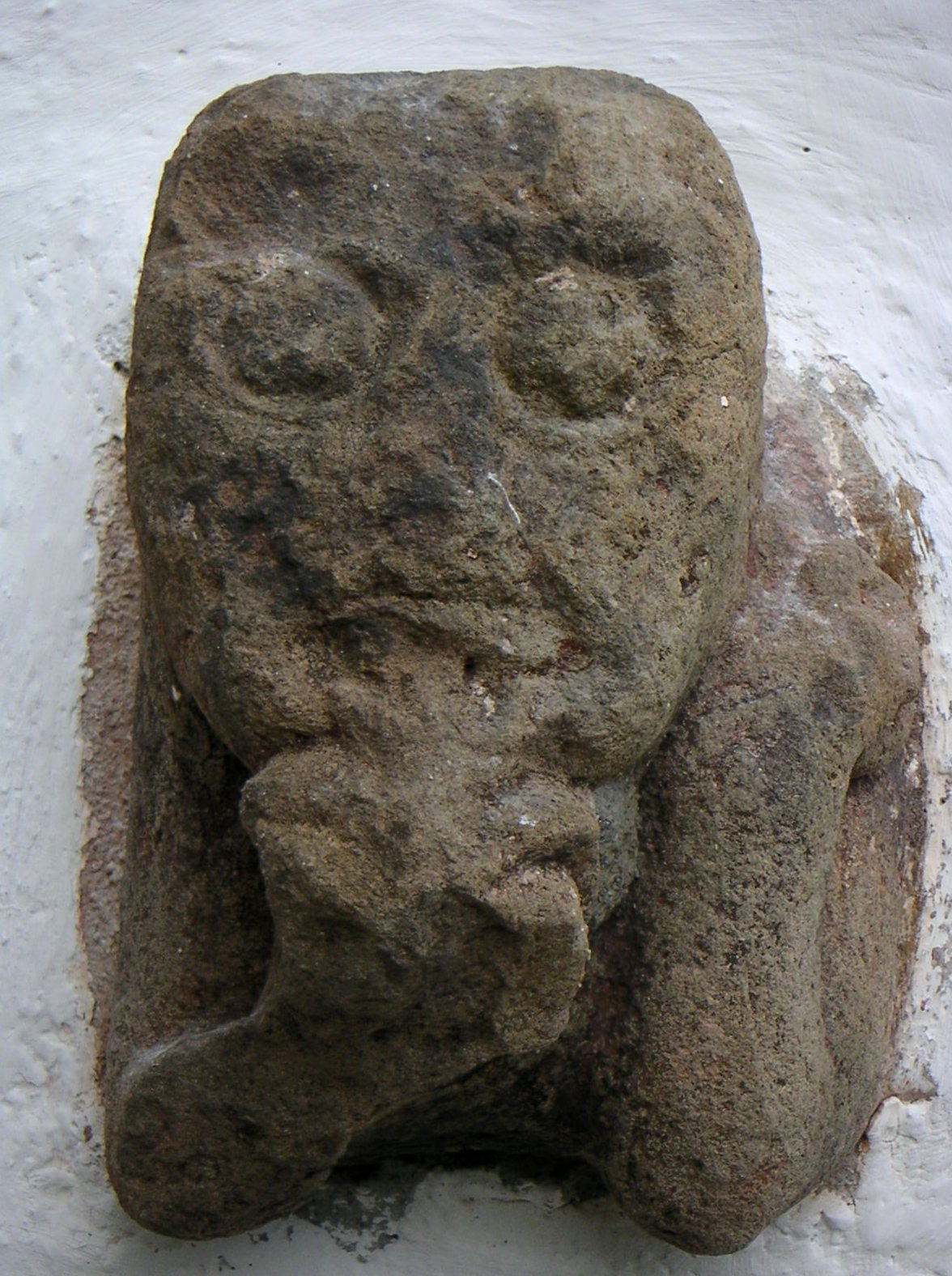
