= Ragnhild Vassvik Kalstad =

Norwegian politician (born 1966)

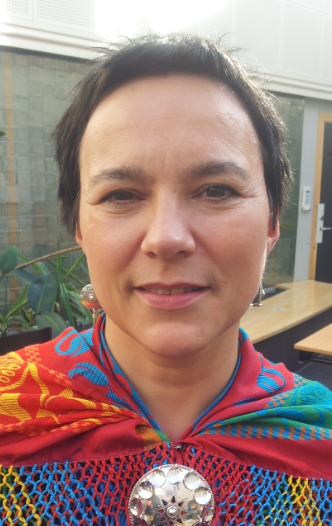

Mayor of Gamvik Municipality
- Incumbent
- Assumed office 12 October 2023
- Deputy: Marius Nilsen
- Preceded by: Alf Normann Hansen

County Mayor of Finnmark
- In office 25 October 2017 – 28 October 2019
- Deputy: Tarjei Jensen Bech
- Preceded by: Runar Sjåstad
- Succeeded by: Ivar B. Prestbakmo (Troms og Finnmark county)

Deputy County Mayor of Finnmark
- In office 15 October 2015 – 25 October 2017
- County Mayor: Runar Sjåstad
- Preceded by: Bente Haug
- Succeeded by: Tarjei Jensen Bech

Personal details
- Born: 21 June 1966 (age 60) Gamvik, Finnmark, Norway
- Party: Labour

Ragnhild Vassvik Kalstad (born 21 June 1966 in Gamvik Municipality) is a Norwegian politician for the Labour Party. She is currently serving as the mayor of Gamvik Municipality since 2023. Previously she served as county mayor of Finnmark between 2017 and 2019 and deputy county mayor from 2015 to 2017.

== Political career ==
=== Parliament ===
She served as a deputy representative to the Storting from Finnmark between 2009 and 2013. From 2012 to 2013 she served in Stoltenberg's Second Cabinet as a State Secretary in the Ministry of Government Administration, Reform and Church Affairs.

=== Local politics ===
Kalstad had formerly been a member of the municipal council of Karasjok Municipality.

Following the 2015 elections, Kaltad became the new deputy county mayor (fylkesvaraordfører) of Finnmark. She was promoted to county mayor in 2017 when Runar Sjåstad was elected to Parliament, with Tarjei Jensen Bech as her deputy. She left office following the decision to merge Troms and Finnmark counties and the 2019 local elections. Ivar B. Prestbakmo was elected as county mayor of the new county.

Kalstad had sought to become mayor of her native Gamvik at the 2019 local elections, but ultimately lost to the Socialist Left Party's Alf Normann Hansen.

She again ran for mayor of Gamvik at the 2023 local elections, this time successfully and the Labour Party formed a majority with the Centre and Progress parties. She was joined by the Centre Party's Marius Nilsen as deputy mayor.

Political offices
Preceded by Bente Haug	Deputy County Mayor of Finnmark; 2015–2017	Succeeded by Tarjei Jensen Bech
Preceded by Runar Sjåstad	County Mayor of Finnmark; 2017–2019	Position abolished
Preceded by Alf Normann Hansen	Mayor of Gamvik Municipality; 2023–present	Incumbent
