= Erling Fløtten =

Norwegian politician

Erling Fløtten (20 November 1937 – 28 October 2010) was a Norwegian politician for the Labour Party.

He served as county mayor (fylkesordfører) in Finnmark between 1987 and 1995. After that, he was regional director of NHO's Finnmark division until his retirement in 2007. As county mayor, Fløtten signed the first agreement of cooperation between Finnmark and the Murmansk Oblast in 1988. In 2009, Fløtten resigned his membership from the Labour Party after he was removed from the board of the Finnmark Estate (FeFo).

Fløtten was also an amateur chess player representing the chess club in Vadsø, and he served as president of the Norwegian Chess Federation between 1997 and 1998. During the third round of the 2010 World Senior Chess Championship in Arco, Italy, Fløtten collapsed at the chessboard, and despite rapid intervention from medical personnel, his life could not be saved.

Political offices
Preceded by Helmer Mikkelsen	County mayor of Finnmark; 1995–2003	Succeeded by Evy-Ann Midttun
