= Helga Pedersen (Norway) =

Norwegian politician

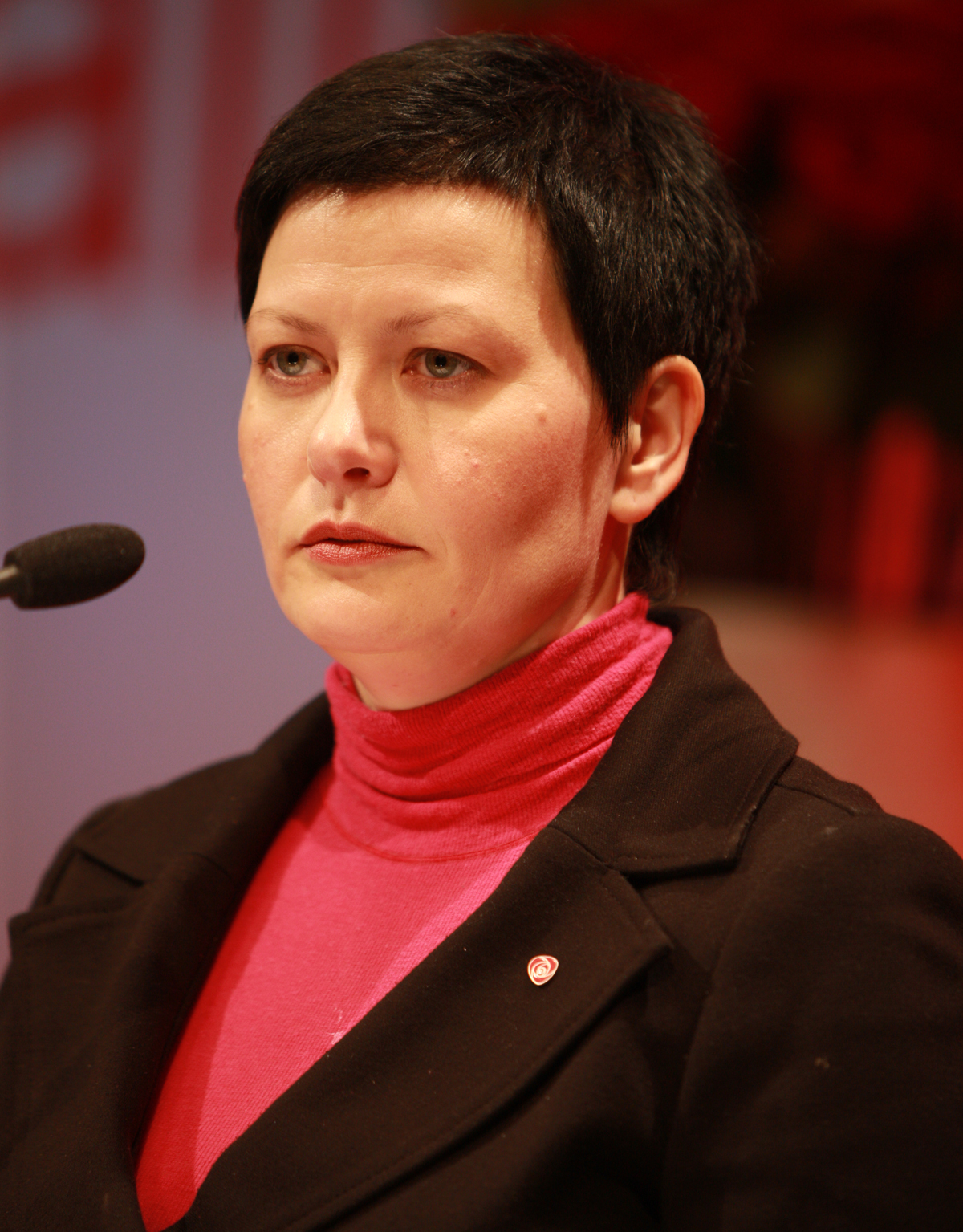
- Pedersen in 2009

Mayor of Tana Municipality
- In office 10 October 2019 – 12 October 2023
- Deputy: Odd Erik Solbakk
- Preceded by: Frank Martin Ingilæ
- Succeeded by: Jon Erland Balto

Deputy Leader of the Labour Party
- In office 22 April 2007 – 18 April 2015
- Leader: Jens Stoltenberg; Jonas Gahr Støre
- Preceded by: Hill-Marta Solberg
- Succeeded by: Hadia Tajik; Trond Giske

Minister of Fisheries and Coastal Affairs
- In office 17 October 2005 – 2 October 2009
- Prime Minister: Jens Stoltenberg
- Preceded by: Svein Ludvigsen
- Succeeded by: Lisbeth Berg-Hansen

County Mayor of Finnmark
- In office October 2003 – 25 October 2005
- Deputy: Kirsti Saxi
- Preceded by: Evy-Ann Midttun
- Succeeded by: Kirsti Saxi

Personal details
- Born: 13 January 1973 (age 53) Sør-Varanger, Finnmark, Norway
- Party: Labour
- Spouse: Erik Brenli (m. 2008)
- Children: 2
- Education: University of Tromsø; University of Bergen

Helga Pedersen (born 13 January 1973) is a Norwegian politician, former Minister, and member of the Storting, who served as the deputy leader for the Labour Party from 2007 to 2015. A native of Sør-Varanger Municipality, she served between 2003 and 2005 as the County Mayor of the northernmost Finnmark county. From 2005 to 2009 she served as Minister of Fisheries and Coastal Affairs, becoming the youngest member of the Labour-led Red-Green Coalition headed by Jens Stoltenberg.

A teacher by profession, she has spent most her adult life as a career politician. In 2009 she was elected to the Norwegian parliament, the Storting for the first time, and from 2009 until the 2013 parliamentary election she served as the Labour Party's parliamentary leader. Officially registered as a member of the Sámi national minority, Pedersen was Norway's first officially Sámi cabinet minister.

== Early life ==
Helga Pedersen was born in Sør-Varanger Municipality in Finnmark county on 13 January 1973, but was raised in the rural settlement of Vestertana in the nearby Tana Municipality. Her father, Terje Pedersen (born 1941) was a farmer who had built his own sheep-farm, as well as being a fisherman and a local politician. Her mother, Hjørdis Langholm (born 1942), was originally from Jæren and worked as a registered nurse. She grew up with three siblings in a culturally Sámi household.

=== Education ===
She attended elementary school as well as lower secondary school at the local settlement school in Vestertana. Later she went to Vadsø Upper Secondary school, during which time she spent a year studying at the Lycée Alain Chartier in Bayeux, France. Upon finishing high school, she enrolled in the University of Bergen graduating in 1996 with a bachelor's degree in Russian studies. After leaving Bergen she enrolled in the University of Tromsø, graduating in 1998 with a degree in History.

== Early career ==
Pedersen started her professional career in 1992, when she was employed as a teacher's assistant, and later full-time teacher at the rural Boftsa school in Tana. She left the job in 1993. In 1998 she was hired as a construction planning consultant by the Finnmark county administration. This employment lasted until 2000.

== Political career ==
Her political career started early. She became leader of her local Workers' Youth League chapter at age 19 and later served as political adviser within the Labour Party. At age 30 she was elected county mayor for Finnmark. From April to October 2001, during the first cabinet Stoltenberg, she was appointed political advisor in the Ministry of Industry and Trade. In 2005, during the second cabinet Stoltenberg, she was appointed Minister of Fisheries and Coastal Affairs. Pedersen is the first politician of Sámi descent to have been member of any country's government, and also the first member of any ethnic minority hold a place in the Norwegian government.

On the local level she was a deputy member of Finnmark county council from 1999 to 2003, and county mayor from 2003 to 2005. In 2007 she was elected as deputy leader of the Labour Party, as the first woman with Sámi background to hold this position. Following the 2009 election, Pedersen was chosen to be the parliamentary leader for the Labour Party in the Storting. She therefore resigned as fishery minister and left the cabinet. She remained in this capacity until the election defeat in the 2013 parliamentary elections, when former prime minister Jens Stoltenberg returned to the parliament.

Pedersen was named as a potential candidate for the Labour leadership, after Jens Stoltenberg announced he was stepping down as leader, in order to become the Secretary General of NATO. At a special Party Congress in March 2014, Pedersen was snubbed for the leadership post in favour of former Minister of Health Jonas Gahr Støre. She was instead re-elected as deputy leader. On 3 September 2014, she announced her intention of stepping down as deputy leader of the Labour Party due to family reasons.

=== Mayor of Tana ===
She became mayor of Tana Municipality in 2019. Through 2021 she has been part of the municipality's crisis management team (krisestab) in regard to three different incidents: the covid pandemic, a landslide, and a fraud investigation of a manager [from middle management] in the county administration.

Mere weeks before the 2023 party convention, Pedersen was open to succeeding Kjersti Stenseng as party secretary as part of a greater renewal of the party's leadership. This was despite the fact that Stenseng had previously announced that she would seek re-election. On 30 April, Pedersen announced that she wouldn't stand as a candidate to succeed Stenseng, arguing that she didn't have sufficient support within the party.

Pedersen was succeeded by the Centre Party's Jon Erland Balto on 12 October 2023 following the local elections the previous month.

== Personal life ==
Pedersen is married to Erik Brenli, a journalist originally from Brandbu in Hadeland. They married on 12 July 2008, after having been in a relationship for almost five years. Together they have two daughters, named Anna and Maja and they divide their time between Oslo and their rural estate in Vestertana, Finnmark.

Both Pedersen and her children are officially listed as members of the Sámi national minority, gaining some privileges in regards to the Sami parliamentary elections, as well as in agriculture. Pedersen speaks fluently the Sámi language, and always dons the traditional Sámi Gákti dress on official celebrations and receptions.

== Controversies ==
In 2009 media said that Pedersen and her husband illegally had resided in their beach-front home in Tana. The residence was only approved as a part-time vacation retreat, and the couple had not applied for the necessary permits to have it reclassified as an all-year residence.

In 2014 at a local meeting of Labour party members in Vadsø, she called for members to tar (or smear) (Norwegian: sverte) the Conservative-led government; there was criticism, and she apologized for her comments.

Political offices
| Preceded by Evy-Ann Midttun | County Mayor of Finnmark; 2003–2005 | Succeeded by Kirsti Saxi |
| Preceded by Svein Ludvigsen | Minister of Fisheries and Coastal Affairs; 2005–2009 | Succeeded by Lisbeth Berg-Hansen |
| Preceded by Frank Martin Ingilæ | Mayor of Tana Municipality; 2019–2023 | Succeeded by Jon Erland Balto |
Party political offices
| Preceded by Hill-Marta Solberg | Deputy Leader of the Labour Party; 2007–2015 | Succeeded by Hadia Tajik; Trond Giske |
