= Dynna stone =

Late Viking Age runestone from Gran, Norway

Coordinates: 60°19′20″N 10°36′03″E

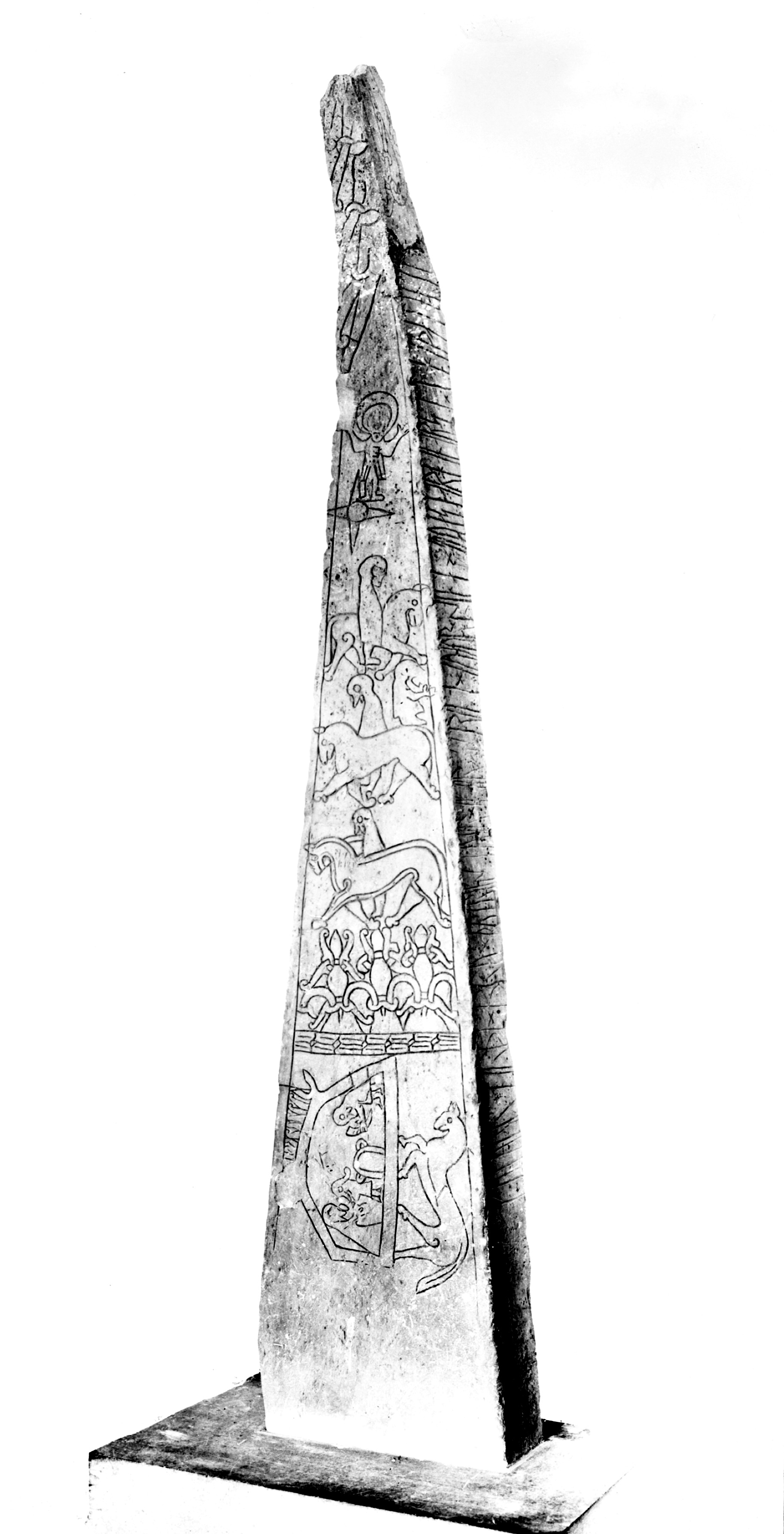
- Created: 11th century
- Discovered: 1823 AD; Currently Oslo, originally Gran, Gran Municipality, Norway
- Rundata ID: N 68
- Runemaster: Unknown

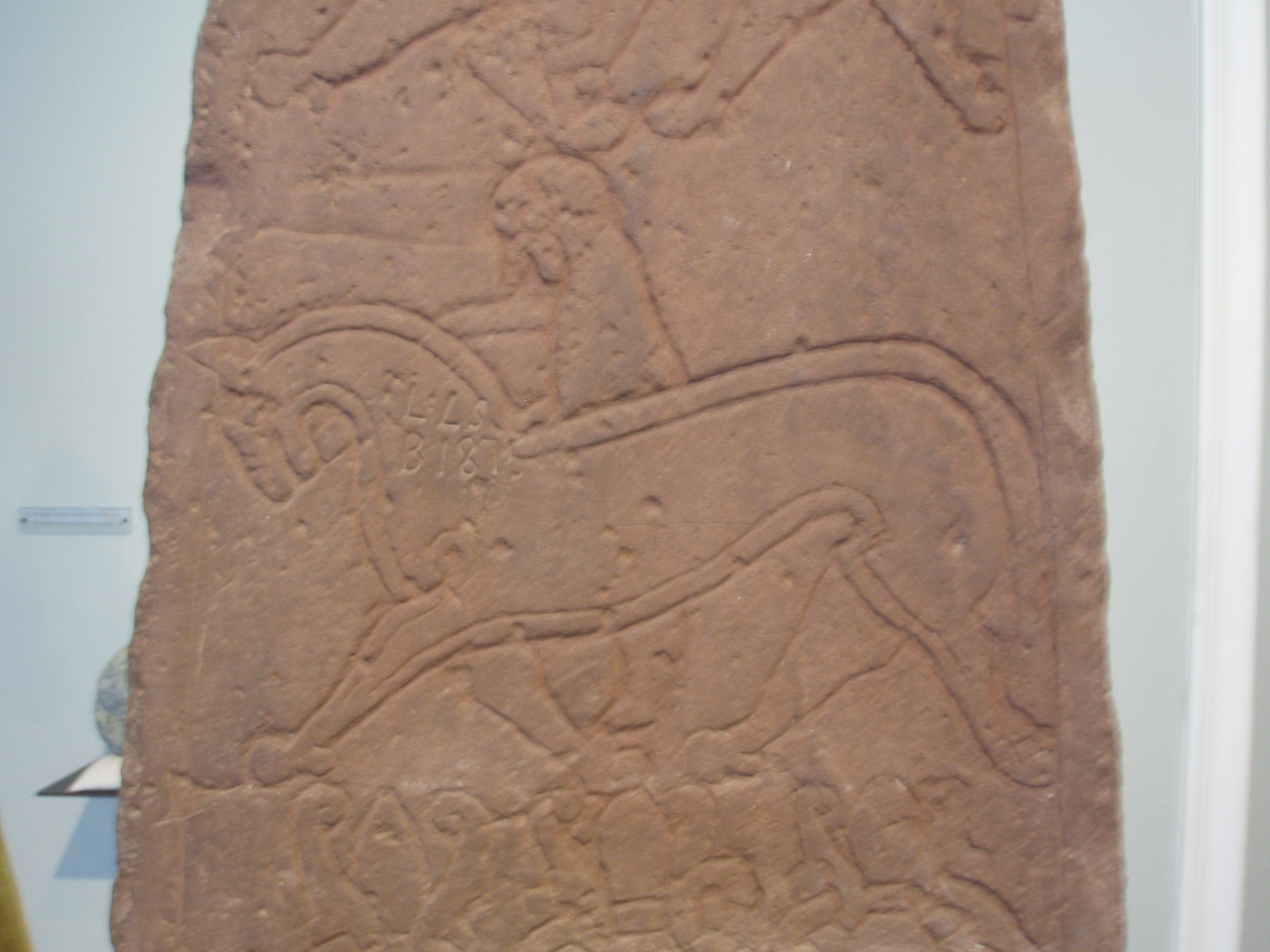
Detail of Dynna Stone image.

The Dynna Stone is a runestone from the late Viking Age that was originally located in Gran Municipality, Norway.

== Description ==
The Dynna Stone, listed as N 68 under Rundata, is a roughly 3-meter-tall, triangular slab of pinkish-red sandstone with runic inscriptions running down one of its edges, and with carved images on the front. The stone was erected ca. AD 1040 – 1050, and its imagery is considered among the first Christian pictorial art in Norway. The rather crude images on the front of the stone slab depict the nativity scene of Matthew 2:1–12, including the infant Jesus, the Star of Bethlehem and the three wise men on horseback. The two women mentioned in the runic inscription were likely familiar with the story of the Epiphany. It has been suggested that the use of the term "handiest" (or "most skilled") in the runic text for the dead girl was a reference to her textile or embroidery designs, and that the images on the stone may represent these designs.

The Stone's inscription is in the younger futhark, although their use is inconsistent with long-branch and short-twig runes used in some places. Sometimes the carver used both the long-branch and short-twig forms of the same rune within the same word.

The reference to bridge-building in the runic text is fairly common in rune stones during this time period. Some are Christian references related to passing the bridge into the afterlife. At this time, the Catholic Church sponsored the building of roads and bridges through the use of indulgences in return for intercession for the soul. There are many examples of these bridge stones dated from the eleventh century, including runic inscriptions Sö 101, U 489, and U 617. Although the Dynna Stone uses Christian imagery and text, the stone was raised among the old family grave mounds, an indication of cultic continuity even after the conversion to Christianity.

The Dynna stone shows that Hadeland was closely connected to countries abroad such as Scotland as stones similar to this one are found in Scotland. In one of the twin churches at Gran (Nicolai church) a stone similar to the Dynna stone was found in the wall above the door between the top of the door and ceiling. It was seen in 1823 and last in 1828.

The Dynna stone was acquired by the Norwegian Museum of Cultural History in Oslo in 1879. Until then it had been used as a salt lick for cattle at the Nordre Dynna farm near Gran. The stone is still part of the museum’s permanent medieval exhibition. A copy of the stone can be found atop a Viking Age grave mound at the Hadeland Folkemuseum in Gran.

== Inscription ==
Reading
Reading of the Dynna stone's text in Old West Norse.

× kunuur × kirþi × bru × þririks tutir × iftir osriþi × tutur × sina × su uas mar hanarst × o haþalanti
{} Gunnvǫr {} gerði {} brú, {} Þrýðríks dóttir, {} eptir Ástríði, {} dóttur {} sína. {} Sú var mær hǫnnurst {} á Haðalandi
"Gunnvôr, Þryðríkr's daughter, made the bridge in memory of her daughter Ástríðr. She was the handiest maiden in Haðaland."

== See also ==
- List of runestones
- Runic alphabet
