= Sister Churches, Norway =

Two medieval masonry churches, Gran municipality, Norway

Sister Churches / Søsterkirkene
- Mariakirken / Nikolaikirken
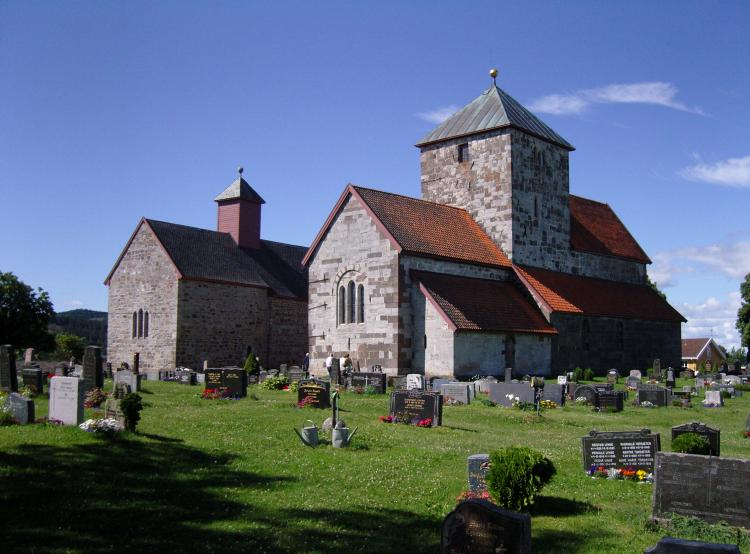
- View of the Mariakirken to the left and the Nikolaikirken to the right
- Sister Churches / Søsterkirkene
- 60°22′00″N 10°31′46″E
- Location: Gran Municipality, Innlandet
- Country: Norway
- Denomination: Church of Norway
- Previous denomination: Catholic Church
- Churchmanship: Evangelical Lutheran

History
- Status: Churches
- Founded: 12th century
- Consecrated: 12th century

Architecture
- Functional status: Inactive
- Architectural type: Long church
- Completed: c. 1150 (876 years ago)

Specifications
- Materials: Stone

Administration
- Diocese: Hamar bispedømme
- Deanery: Hadeland og Land prosti
- Parish: Gran/Tingelstad
- Norwegian Cultural Heritage Site
- Type: Church
- Status: Automatically protected
- ID: 84396

The Sister Churches (Norwegian: Søsterkirkene) consist of two 12th-century churches that were built right next to each other in Gran Municipality in Innlandet county, Norway. They are part of the Church of Norway and are located in the village of Granavollen. They are part of the Gran/Tingelstad parish which is part of the Hadeland og Land prosti (deanery) in the Diocese of Hamar.

The two churches are both gray stone buildings that were both built in a long church design during late-12th century. The church that sits to the north is called St. Nicholas' Church (Norwegian: Nikolaikirken) and the church that sits to the south is called St. Mary's Church (Norwegian: Mariakirken).

According to local folklore, the churches were commissioned by two sisters who had fallen out and therefore would not be seen in the same church. It is, however, not uncommon for medieval churches with different functions to be built close to one another. It is more likely that the smaller Mariakirken was a church for a monastery while the Nikolaikirken was a regular parish church.

== Nikolaikirken ==
The larger of the churches is called Nikolaikirken (St. Nicholas Church). This church probably acted as a church for Hadeland rural parish and can seat around 250 people. Because of later rebuilding it is difficult to establish an exact date of construction, but it is likely that this church is newer than the Mariakirken. Based on stylistic evidence, however, it is thought that the church was built sometime between 1150 and 1200. The church is built as a basilica church with solid Roman columns and plastered walls. The shape and design of the choir was changed during the 13th century and this is also when the large tower was constructed. Much of the original interior has been lost in fires and in subsequent rebuilding over the years. Originally, the tower had a high spire, but it disappeared by a fire in 1799. More of the medieval pieces disappeared from the church during a renovation and modernization during the 1860s. During that construction project, the church was closed and the Mariakirken was used instead.

In 1814, this church served as an election church (Norwegian: valgkirke). Together with more than 300 other parish churches across Norway, it was a polling station for elections to the 1814 Norwegian Constituent Assembly which wrote the Constitution of Norway. This was Norway's first national elections. Each church parish was a constituency that elected people called "electors" who later met in each county to elect the representatives for the assembly that was to meet at Eidsvoll Manor later that year.

== Mariakirken ==
The smaller of the churches is Mariakirken (St. Mary Church), a single nave church, which either acted as a monastic church or a church for the local Gran parish. It was built sometime before 1150, and contains Romanesque and Gothic elements. After the Reformation, this church was typically only used a few times per year. In 1813, the church was struck by lightning which caused a fire that gutted the church. There were no funds to fix the church, so it sat in ruins until 1859. In 1859, the church was repaired by adding a new roof and new windows as well as a new tower. The reason for this rebuilding was so that this church could be used while the Nikolaikirken was to be closed for a renovation. The church was restored in 1912-1915 and it was used as a burial chapel. In 1990-1992 the church was restored and renovated again and since then has been used as a parish church. It can seat around 150 people.

== Churchyard ==
In the southeastern part of the churchyard there is a medieval stone tower, Klokketårnet, the original function of which is unknown. It is possible that the tower, which from the mid-19th century was used as a bell-tower, was originally used as a defence tower or refuge. The 11th century Granavollen Runestone can be found behind the Nikolaikirken.

The towers of the Søsterkirkene form the base coat of arms to Gran Municipality. Noted poet and journalist, Aasmund Olafsson Vinje, is buried in the cemetery of Søsterkirkene. A monument with a bust of Vinjes by sculptor Brynjulf Bergslien was erected at the site.

== Media gallery ==
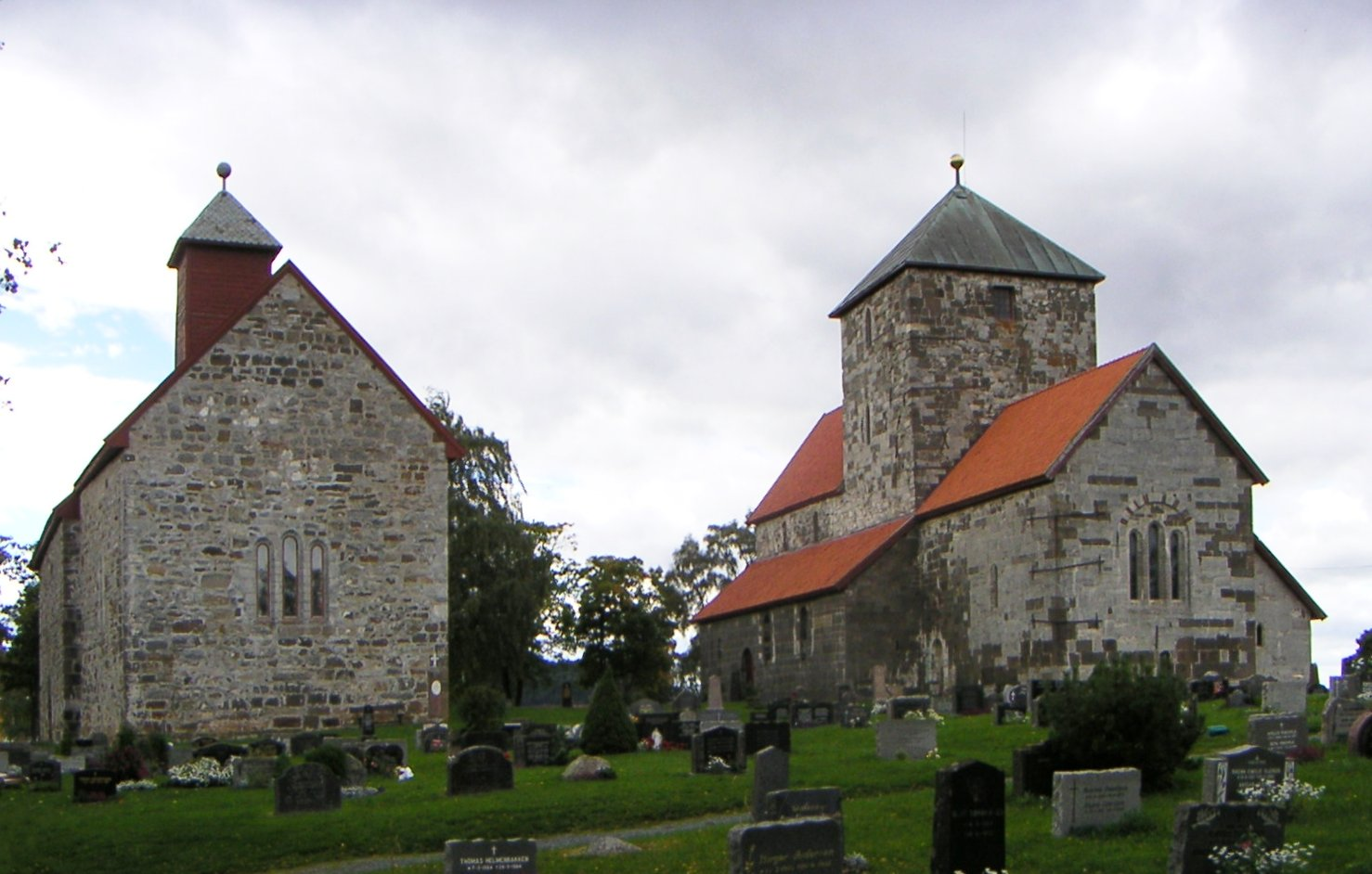
Søsterkirkene at Granavollen

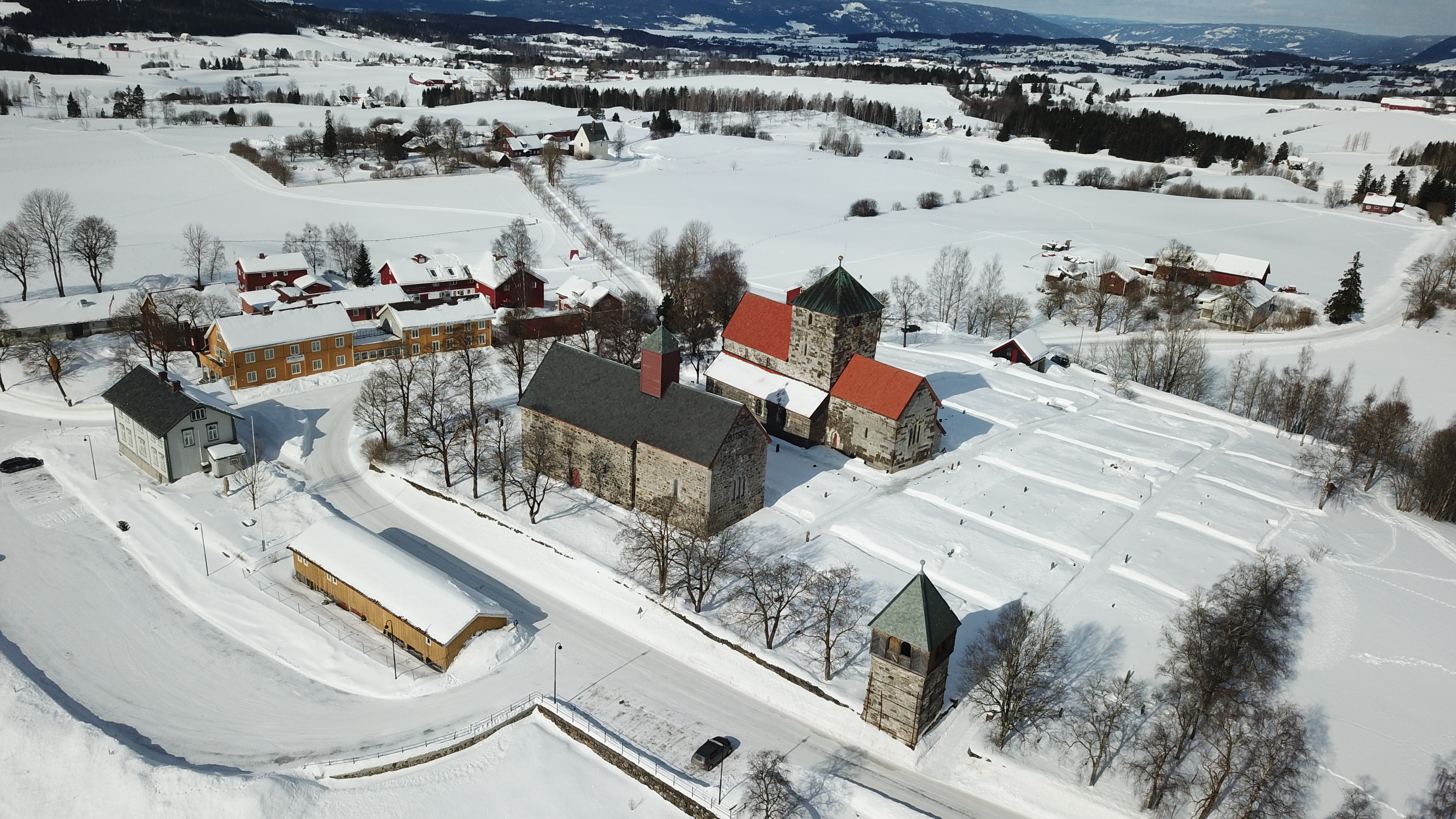
Søsterkirkene in a wintry Hadeland landscape

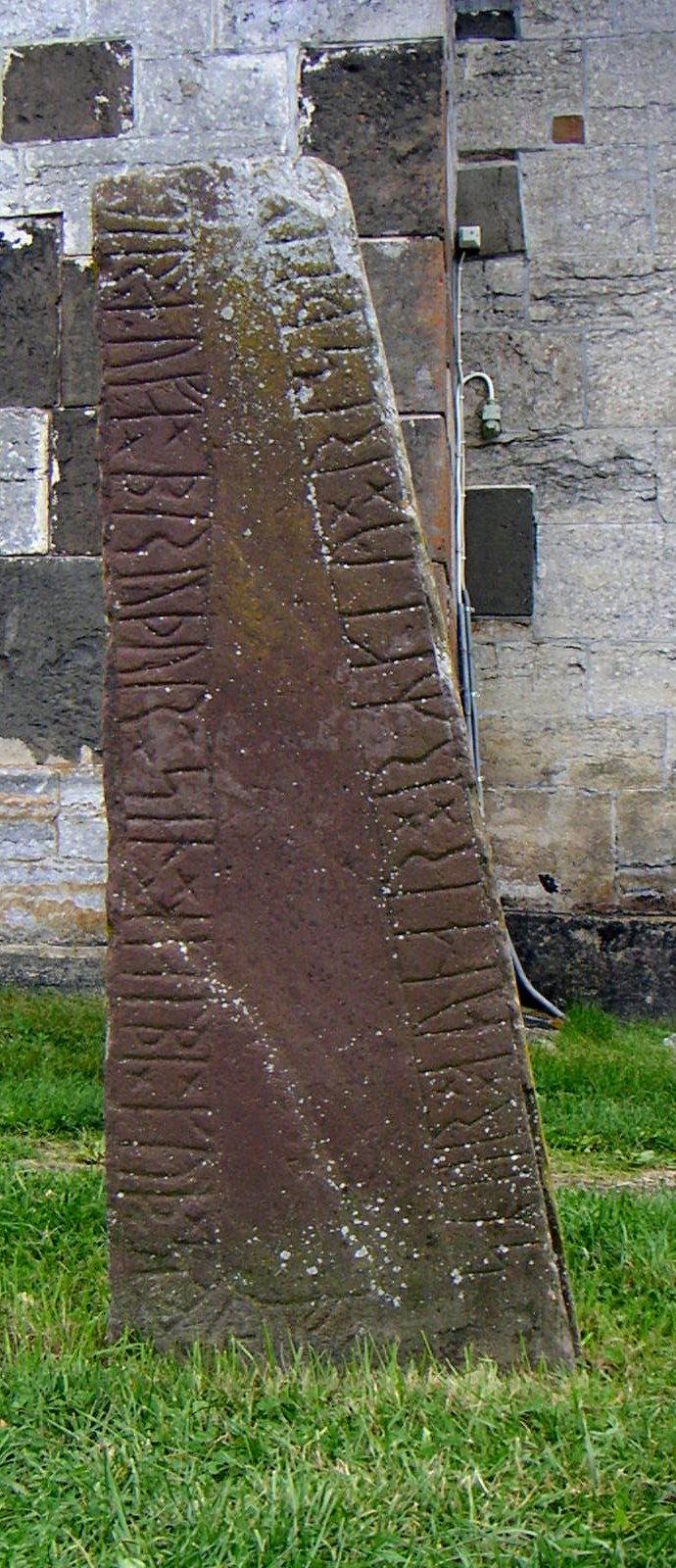
Granavollen Runestone outside Søsterkirkene

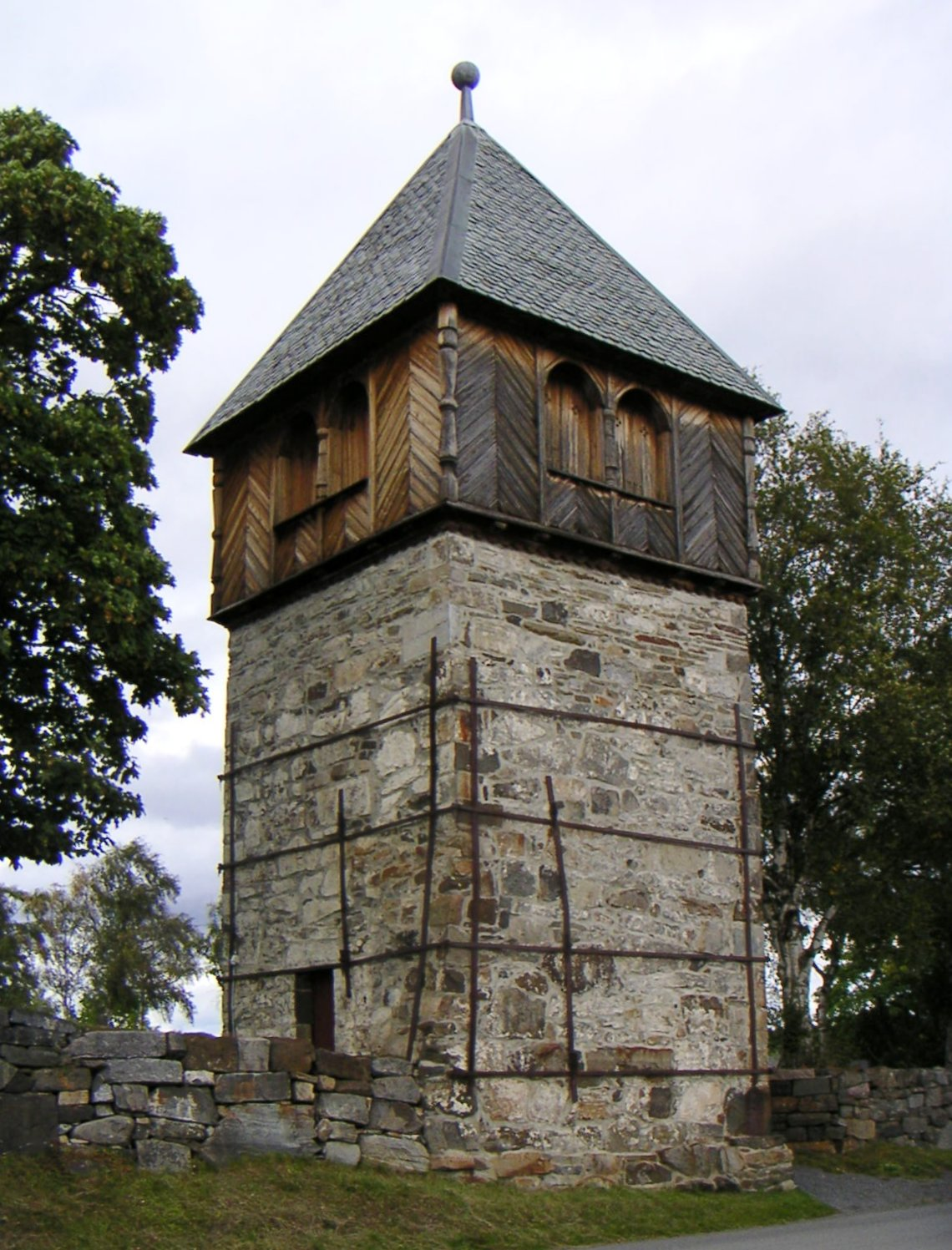
Medieval stone tower by Søsterkirkene

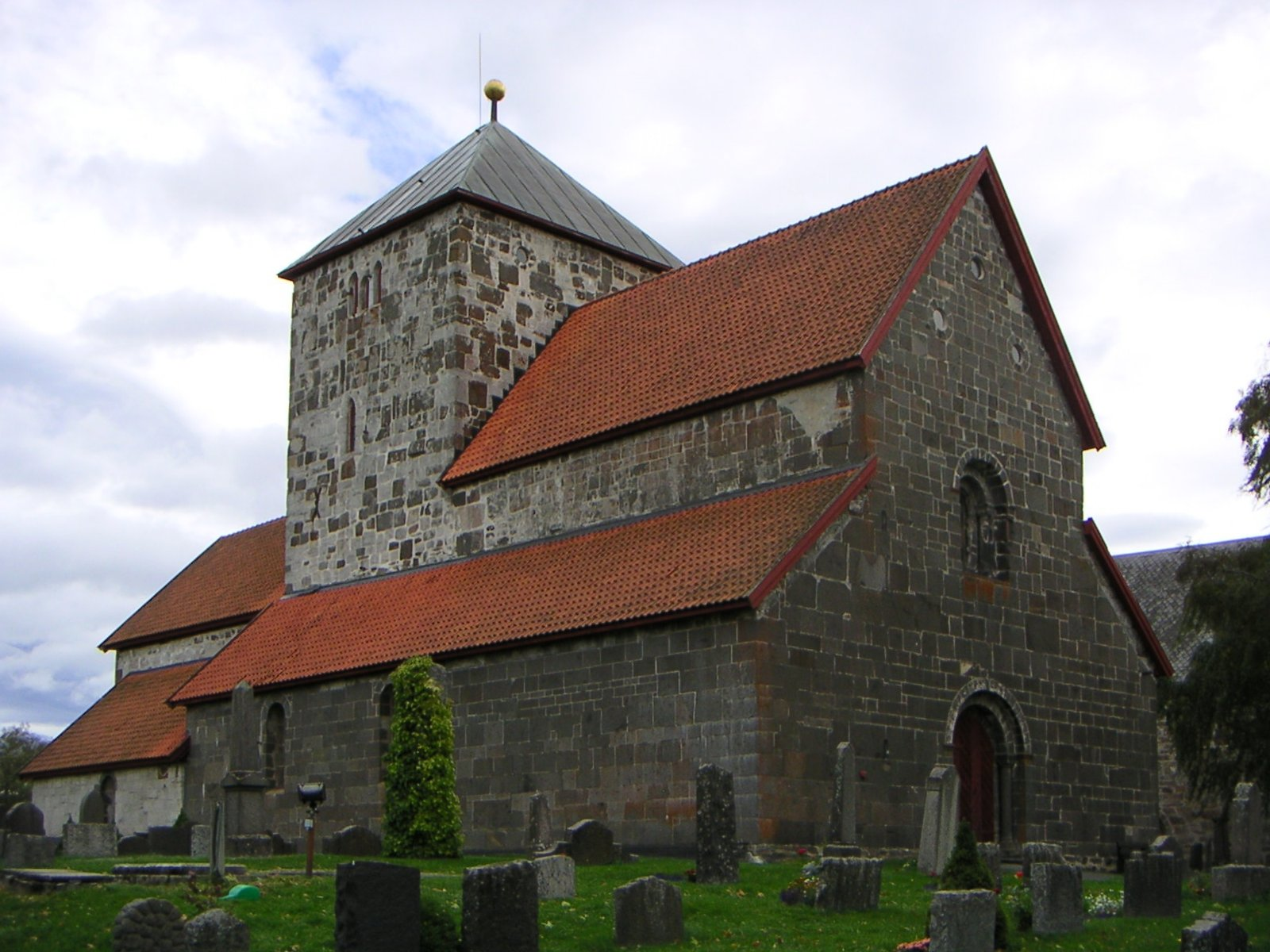
Nikolaikirken

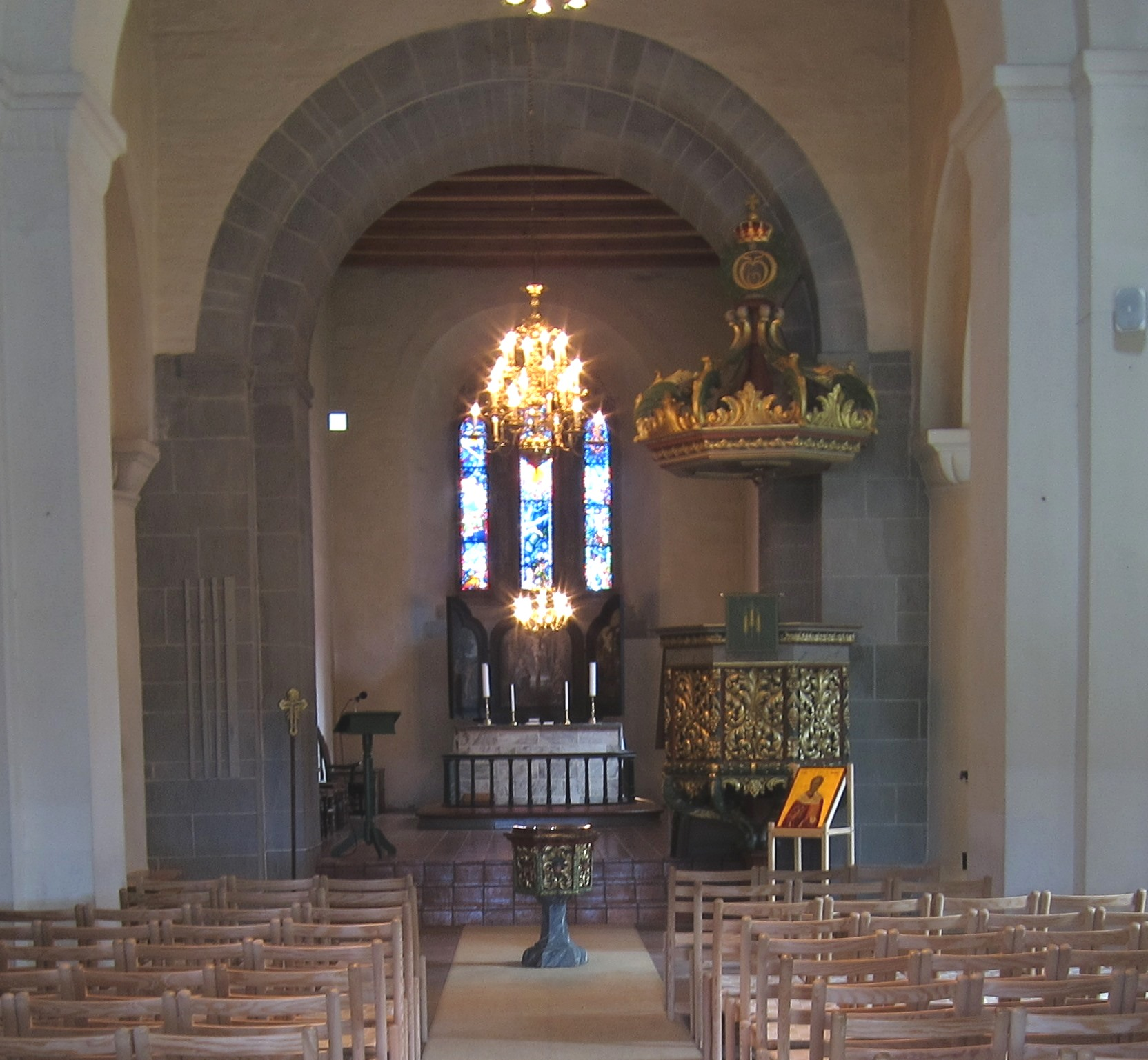
Interior of Nikolaikirken

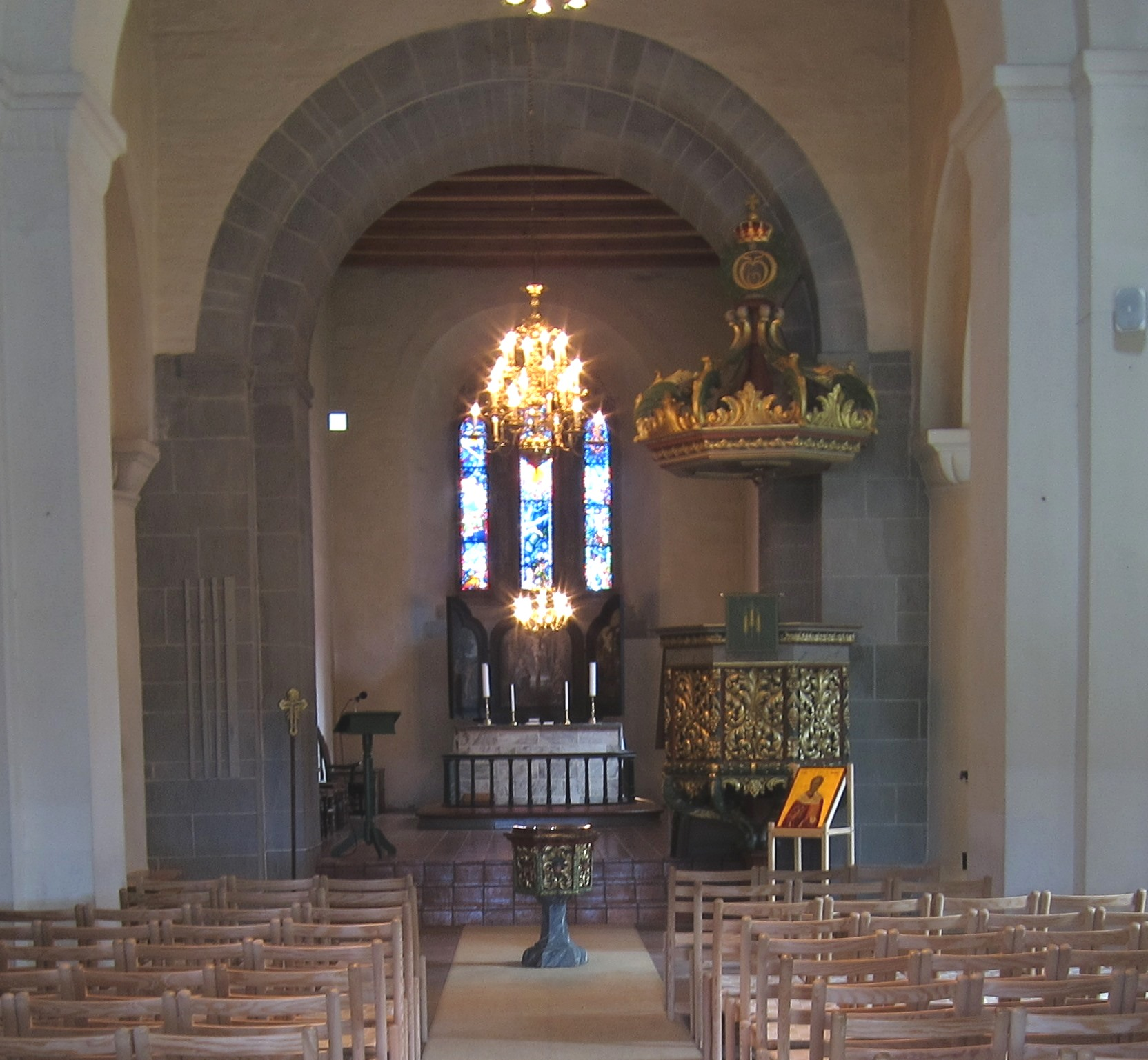
Painting of Nikolaikirken

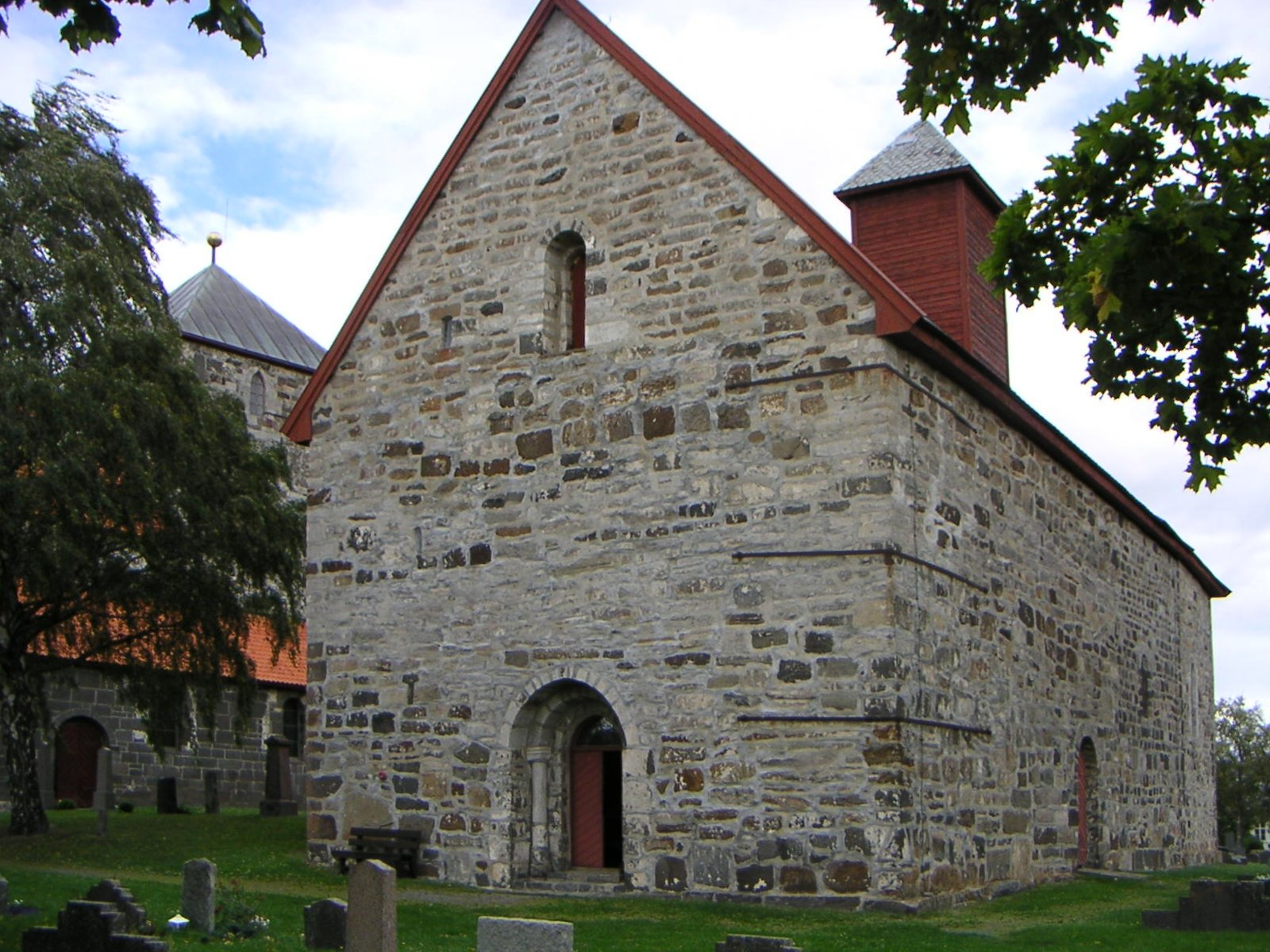
Mariakirken

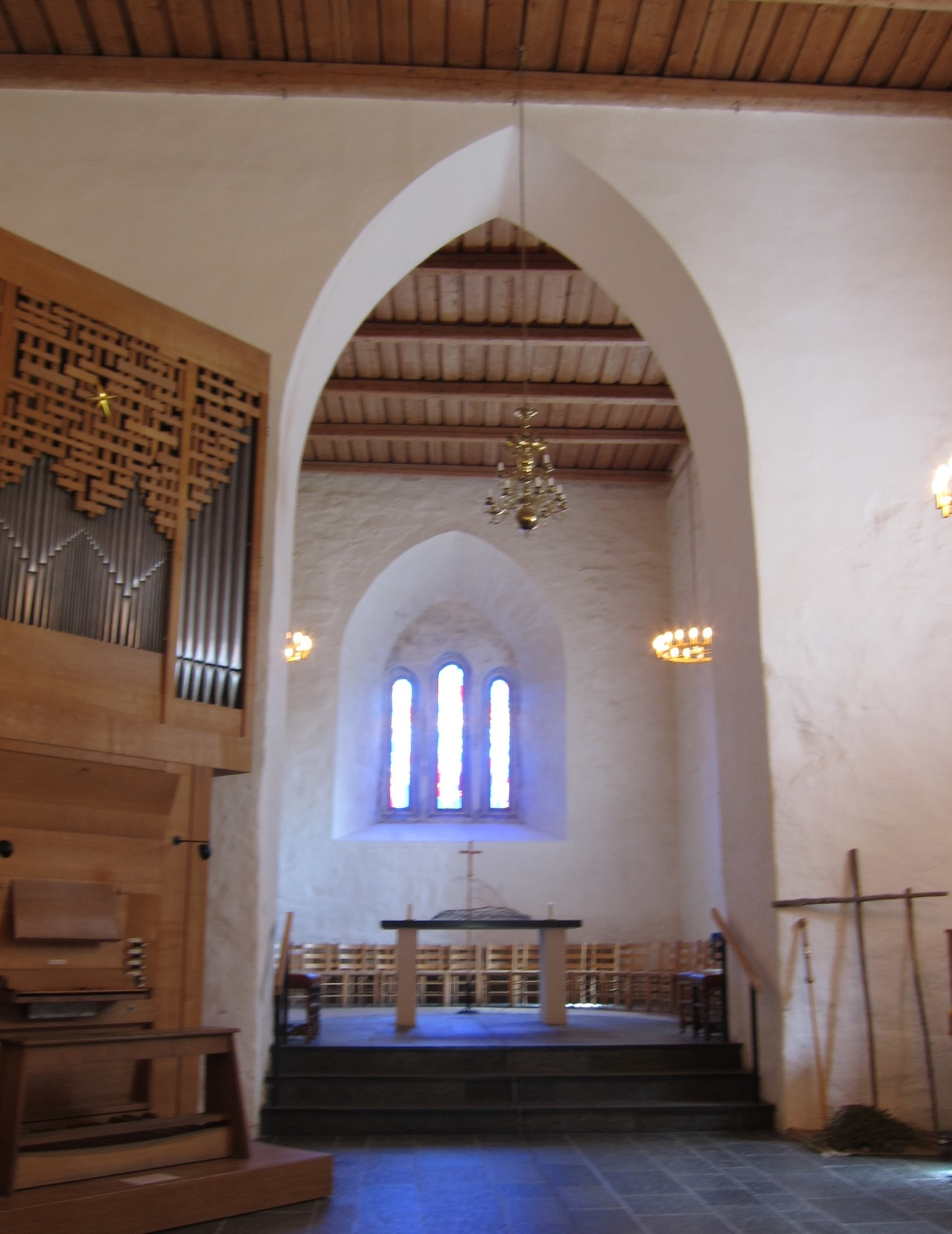
Interior of Mariakirken

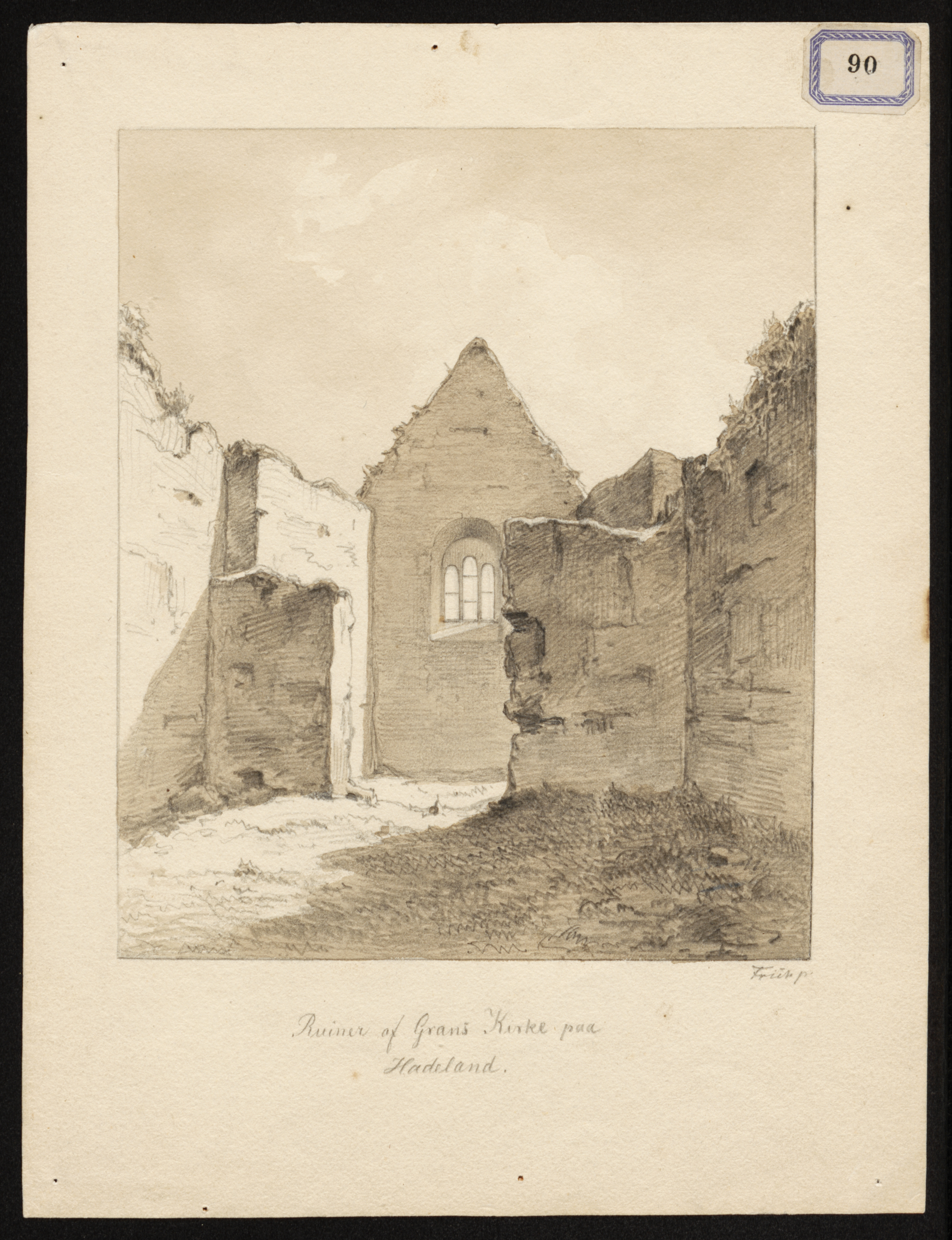
Mariakirken ruins in 1855

== See also ==
- List of churches in Hamar
