= Tingelstad (disambiguation) =

Tingelstad is a village in the municipality of Gran in Innlandet county, Oppland, Norway.

Tingelstad may also refer to:

- Tingelstad Old Church (Tingelstad gamle kirke), a 13th-century stone church at Tingelstad in Norway
- Tingelstad church (Tingelstad kirke), a 19th-century stone church at Tingelstad in Norway

== People with the surname ==
- Bud Tingelstad (1928-1981), American race car driver, born in Frazee, Minnesota
- Kathy Tingelstad (born 1958), American politician who represented district 49B in the Minnesota Legislature
- Marit Tingelstad (born 1938), Norwegian politician for the Centre Party
- Oscar Tingelstad (1882–1953), president of Pacific Lutheran University in Tacoma, Washington
