= Hadeland Folkemuseum =

Museum in Gran, Norway

Coordinates: 60°23′42″N 10°30′42″E

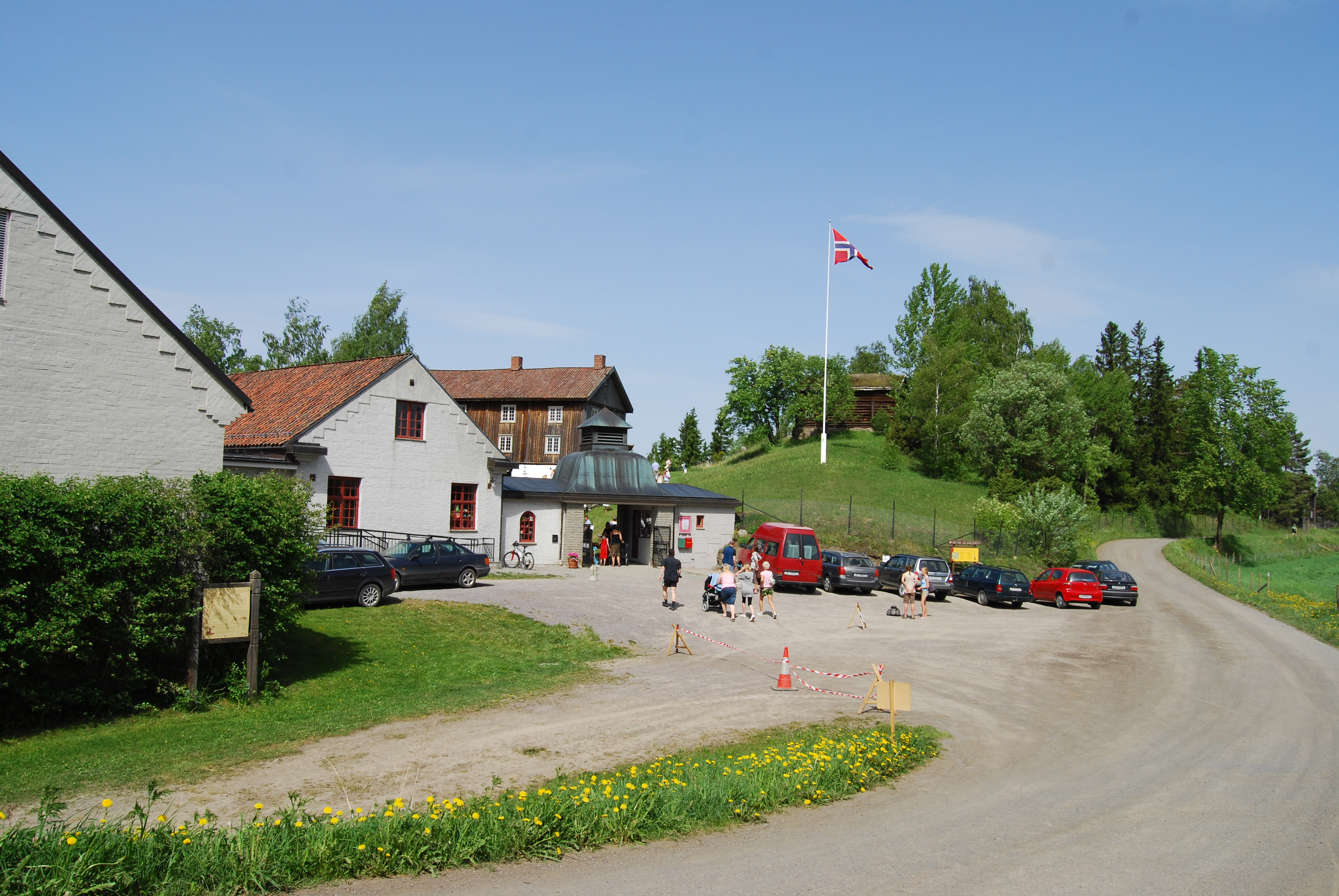
Hadeland Folkemuseum

Hadeland Folkemuseum is a regional museum for Hadeland (Gran Municipality, Lunner Municipality, and Jevnaker Municipality) in southeastern Norway. It was founded in 1913, and is located in Tingelstad in Gran Municipality. The museum is situated along Kongevegen (The King's Road), the road from Oslo to Bergen which passes through Hadeland. Hadeland Folkemuseum is a subsidiary of Randsfjordmuseene, a regional institution which also manages Lands Museum and the Kittilbu Open-Air Museum in western Gausdal Municipality.

== Overview ==
Hadeland Folkemuseum is an open-air museum containing more than 30 buildings from the 17th to the 20th centuries. All the items in the museum are original and have been collected from various farms and other locations in the area. The Documentation Center for Hadeland consist of photographs, archive, objects from Hadeland and a library. Hadeland Folkemuseum has a collection of farm implements as well as a copy of the Dynna stone which dates from the 11th century. The Dynna stone originated in Gran but was relocated to the Norwegian Museum of Cultural History in Oslo in 1879.

Hadeland Folkemuseum is located near the Old Tingelstad Church (Tingelstad gamle kirke) also known as St. Petri Church. The Romanesque stone church was built around 1220 and known for its intact interior from the 16th and 17th century.

Granske Kompagni, a local regiment in Gran municipality during the 16th and 17th century, had its exercise ground nearby at Granavollen. The regimental arsenal building or Tent house (Telthus) has been relocated to Hadeland Folkemuseum.

Located within the museum area is Halvdanshaugen, the reputed grave of a local king from the Viking Age. Halvdanshaugen, (from the Old Norse word haugr meaning mound) is one of several burial sites attributed to Halfdan the Black.

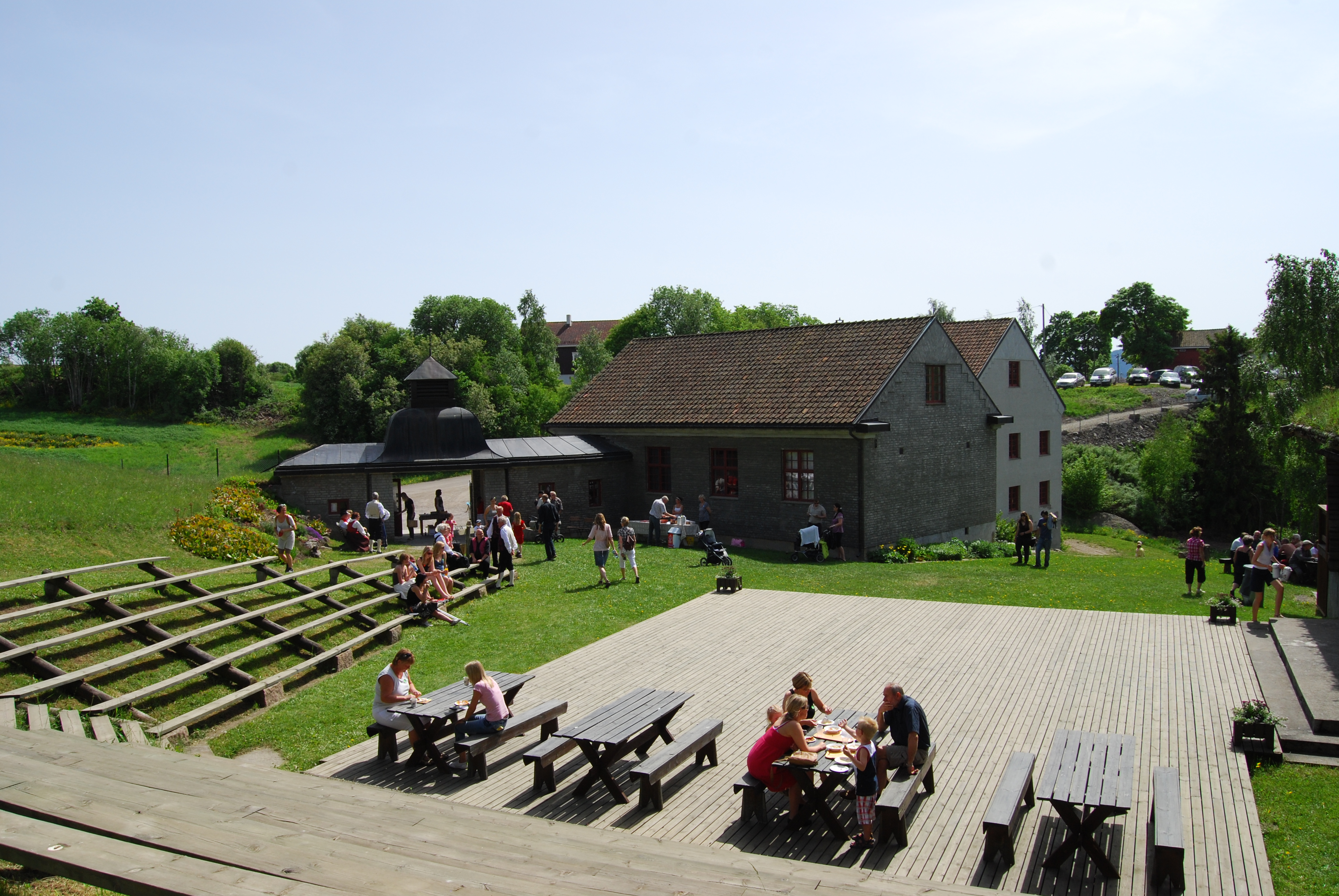
Scene from Hadeland Folkemuseum

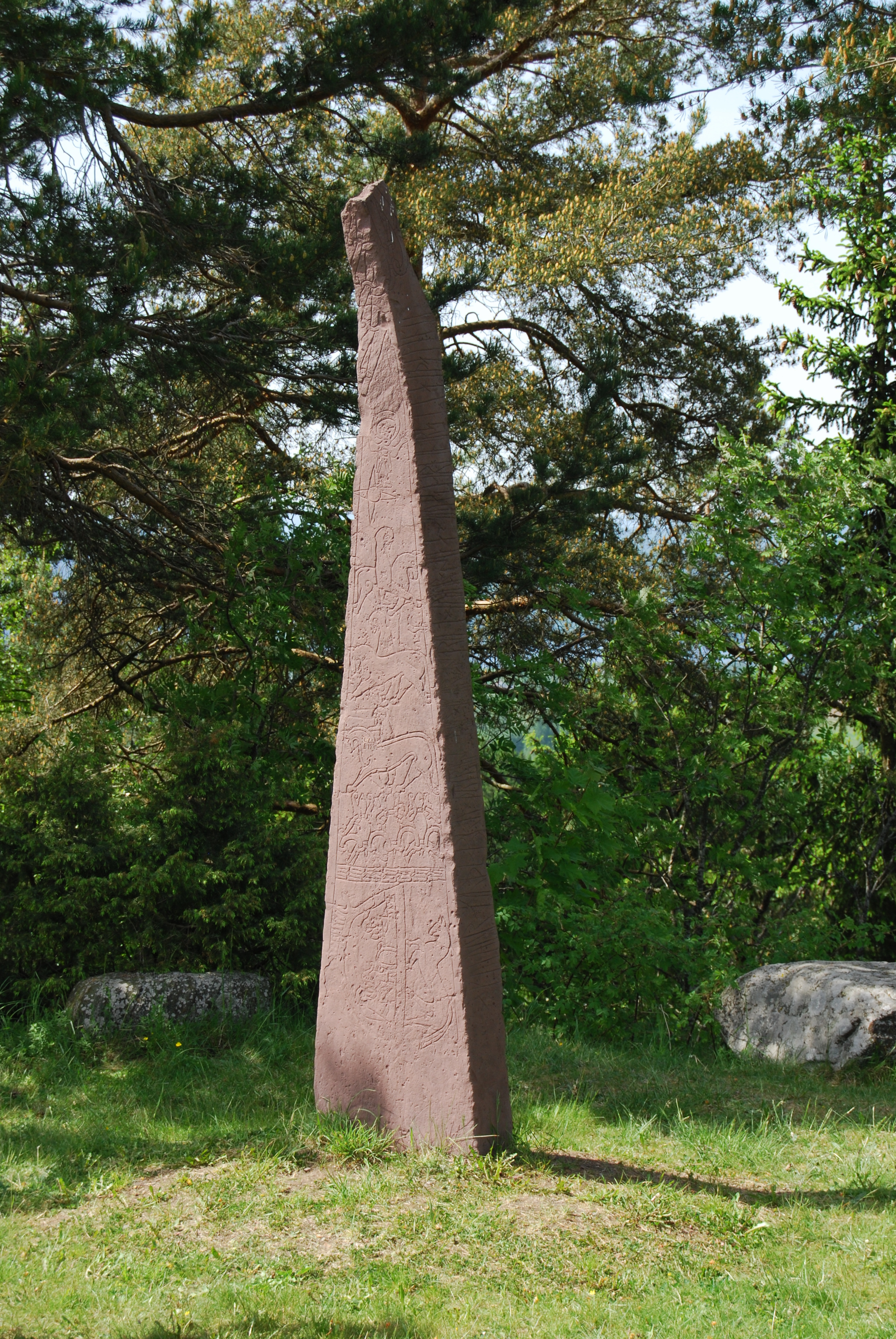
Duplicate of the Dynna stone, Hadeland Folkemuseum

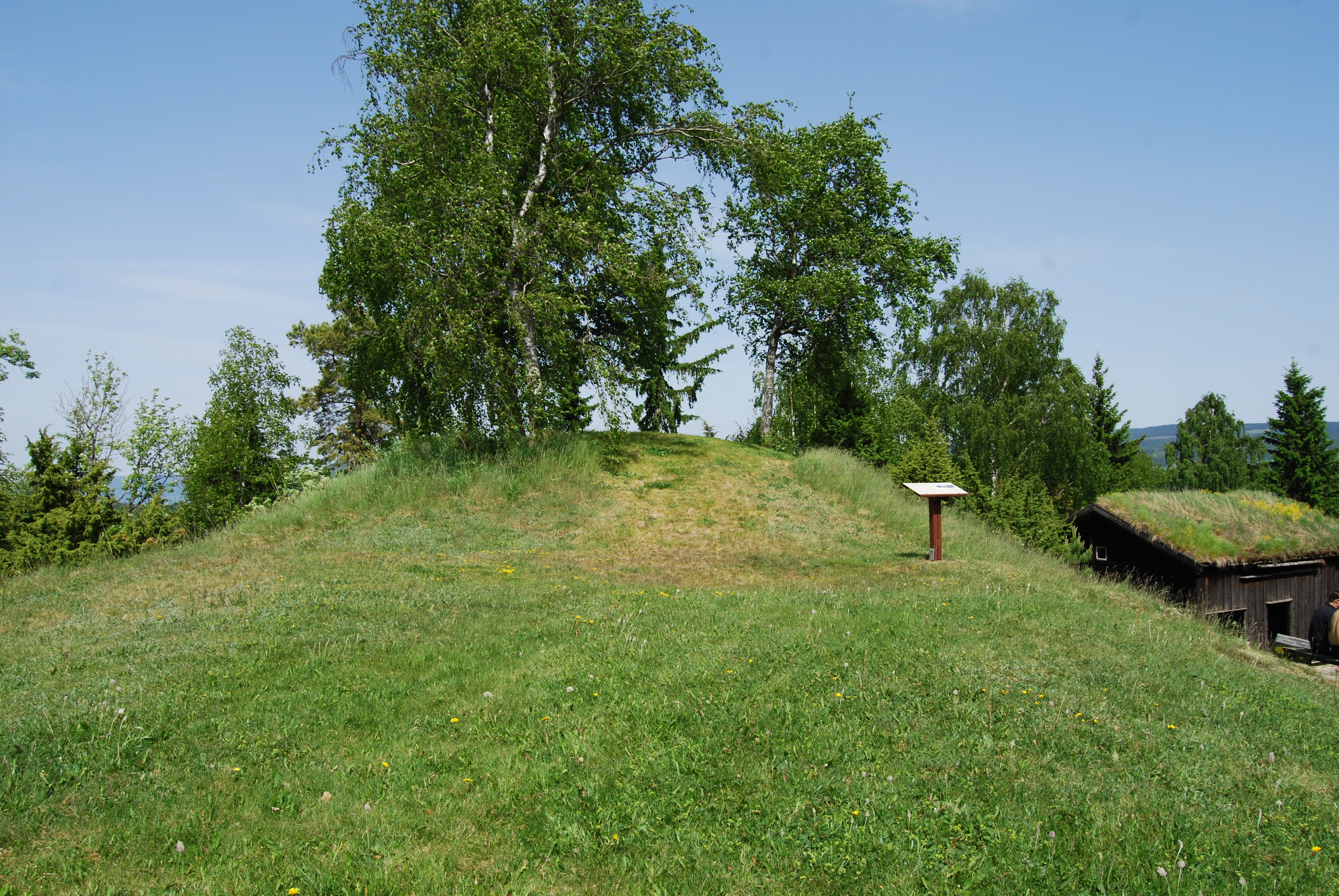
Halvdanshaugen at Hadeland Folkemuseum, one of the several burial sites of Halfdan the Black

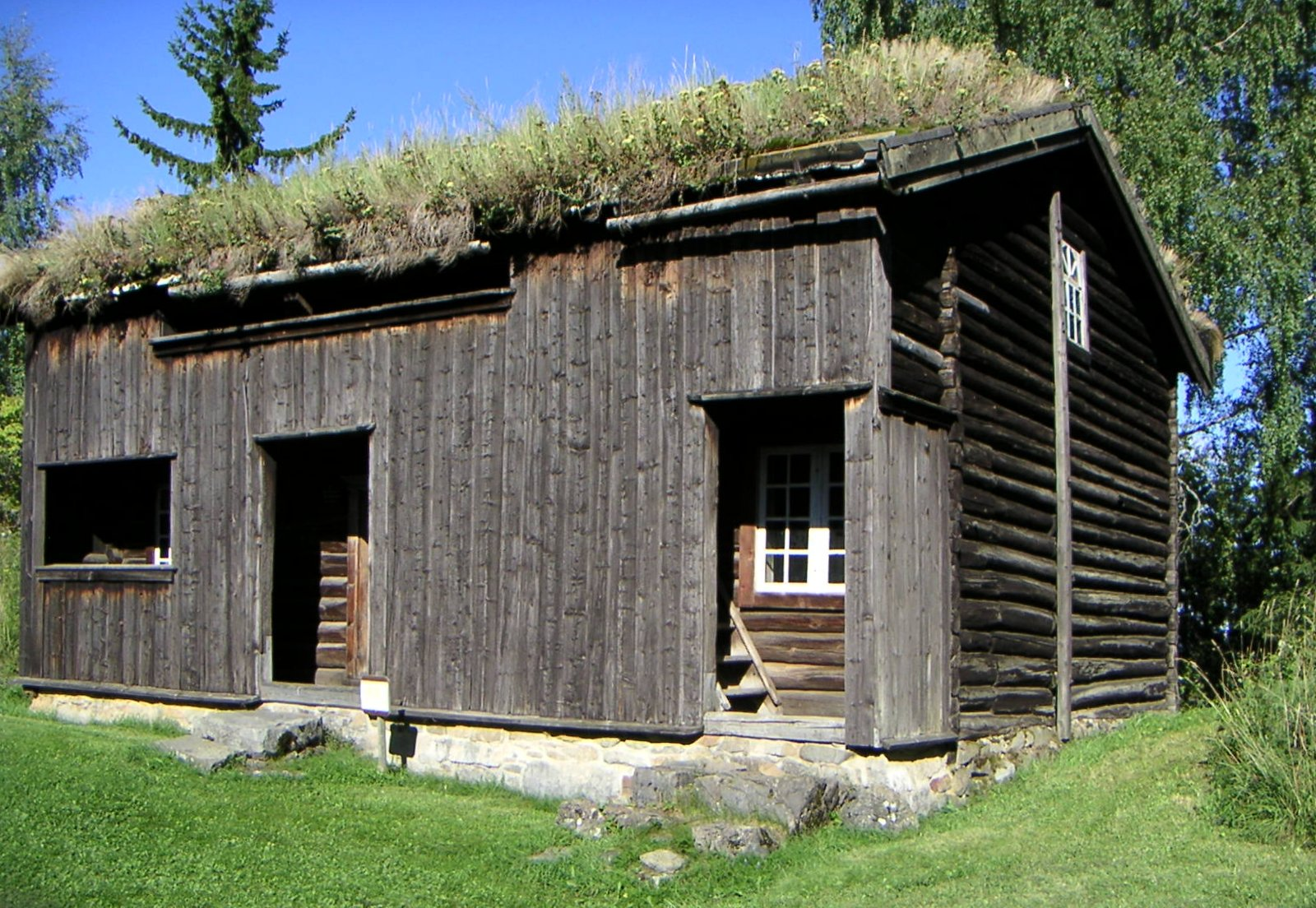
House at Hadeland Folkemuseum relocated from Molstadkvern

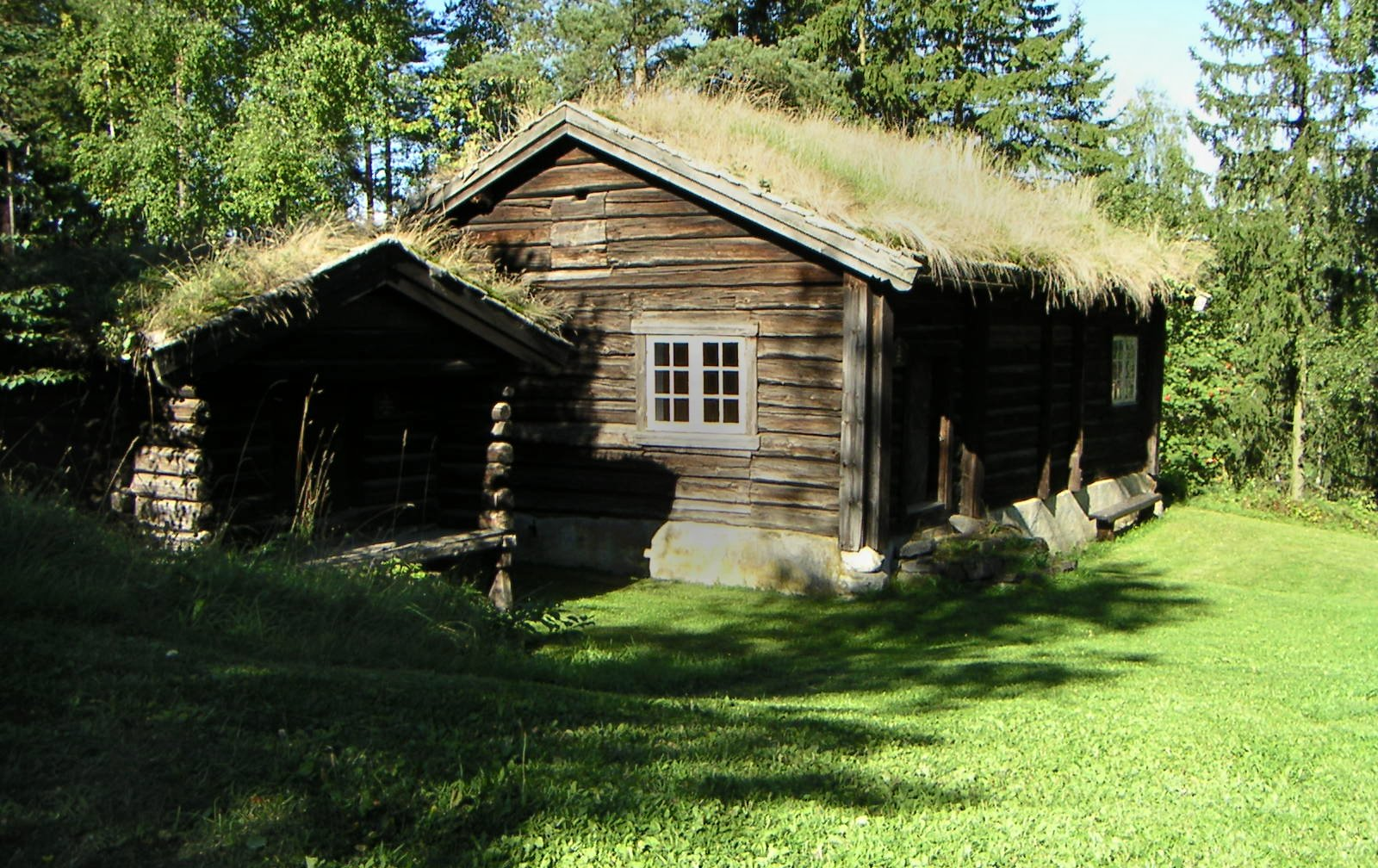
Rural building at Hadeland Folkemuseum

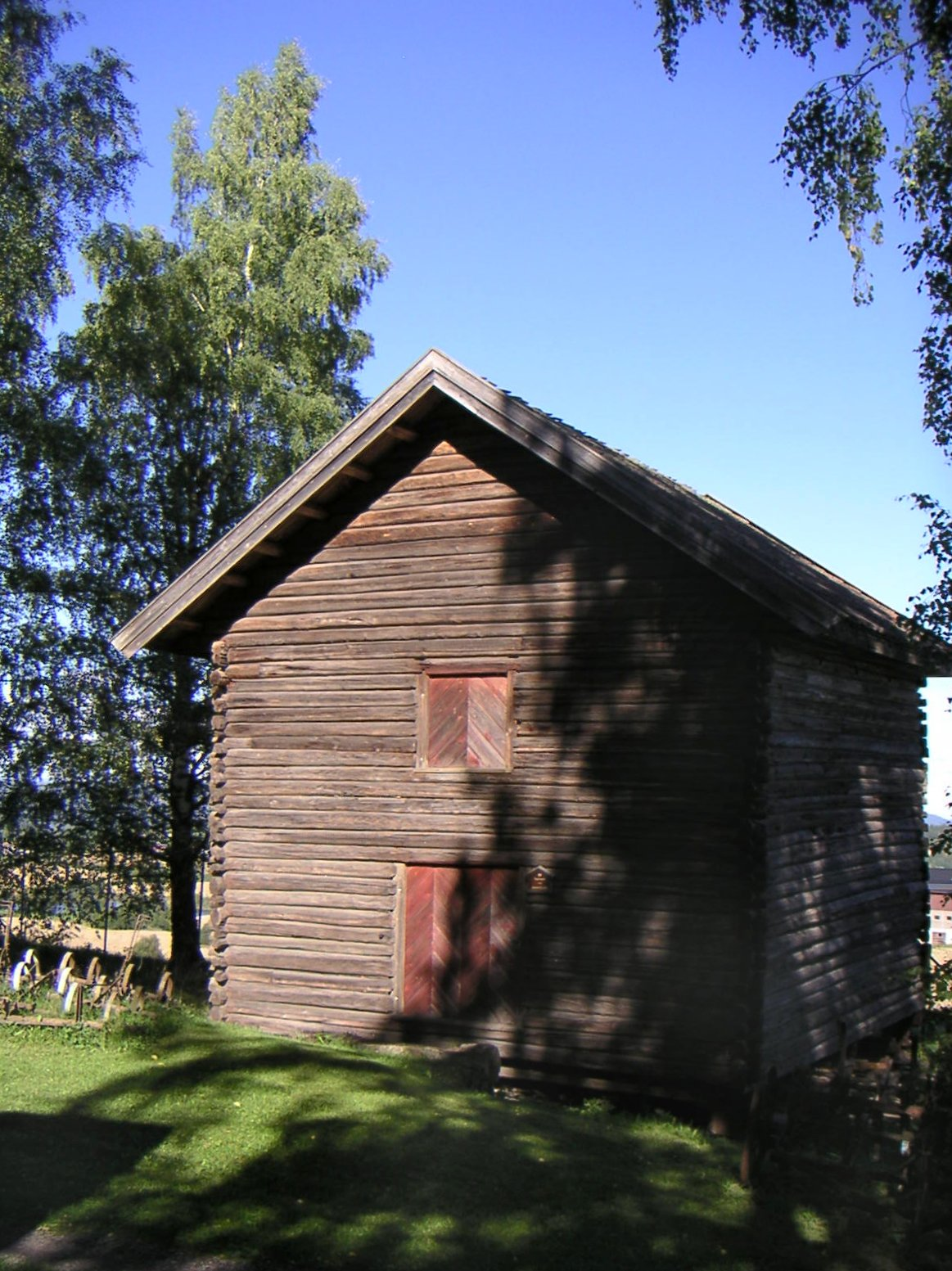
Tent house for Granske regiment, now at Hadeland

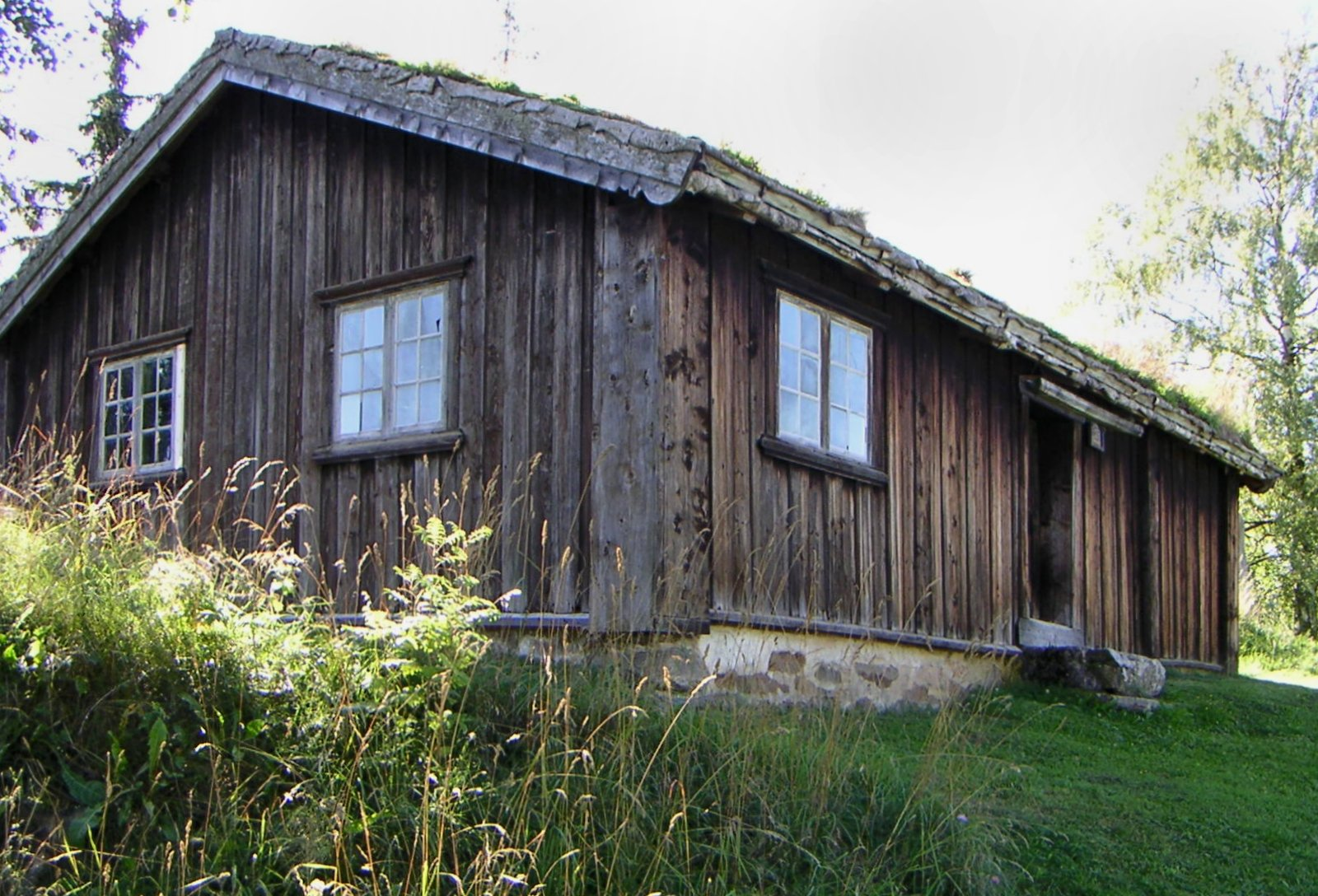
Rural building at Hadeland Folkemuseum

== See also ==
- Lands Museum

== Sources ==
- Østby, Leif Norges Kunsthistorie (1977)
- Bugge, Dr. Anders Hadeland Bygdebok (1932)
