= Lands Museum =

Museum in Norway

Coordinates: 60°50′12″N 10°04′39″E

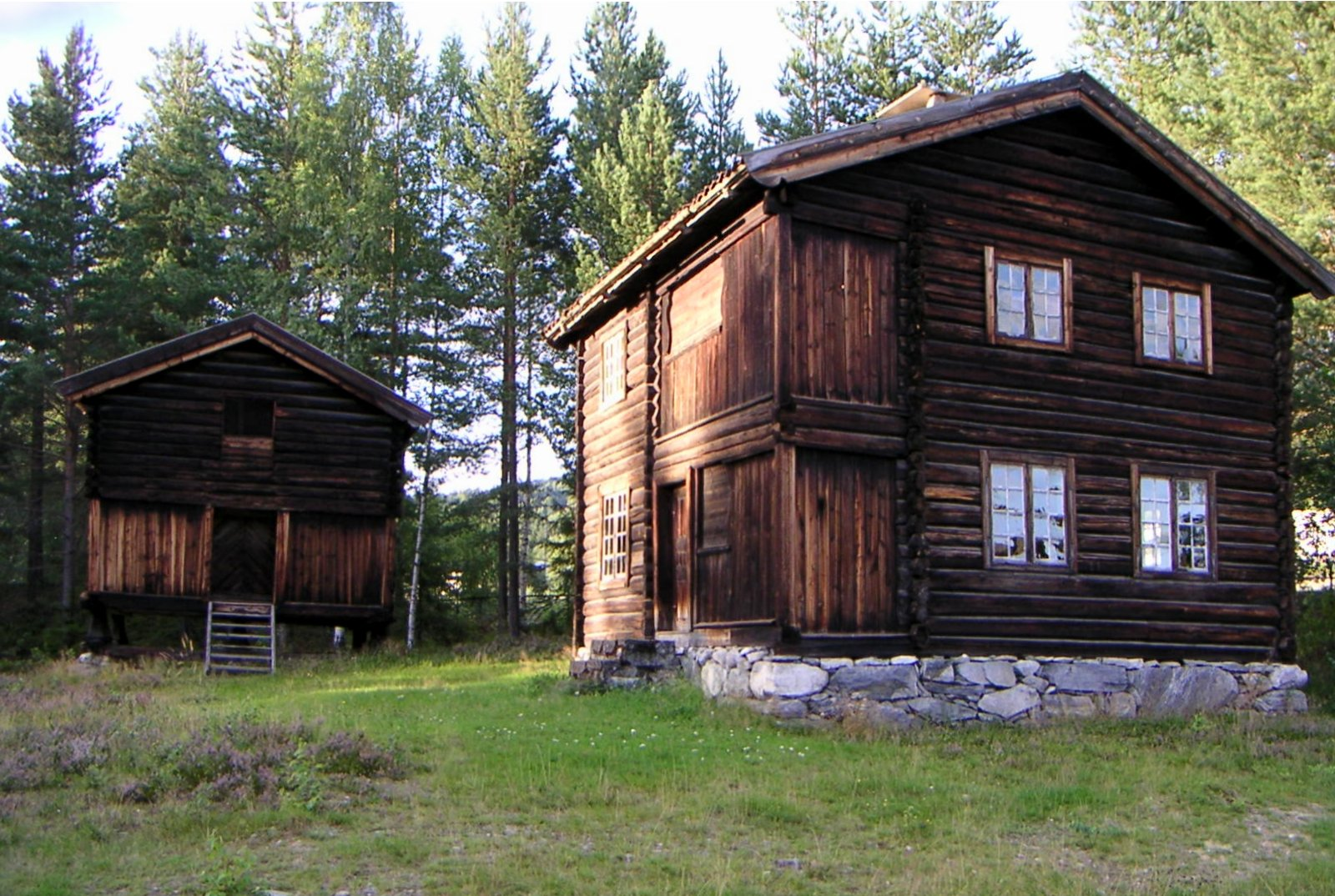
Main house and Stabbur - 17th century from Brone in Nordre Land

Lands Museum is the cultural and natural history centre for Nordre Land Municipality and Søndre Land Municipality in Innlandet county, Norway.

The museum lies at the northern end of Norway’s fourth largest lake, Randsfjorden, and is near the Dokka Delta nature reserve. The museum was founded in 1927. Lands Museum is now a part of Randsfjord Museum together with Hadeland Folkemuseum at Tingelstad in Gran Municipality, Hadeland Bergverksmuseum in Lunner Municipality, and Kittilbu Utmarksmuseum in Gausdal Municipality.

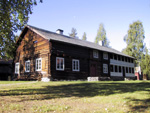
Thomlebygningen - 17th-century from Thomle

The museum contains more than 30 historical buildings the oldest dating from around the year 1630. Among them is a 17th-century house from Thomle farm (Thomlebygningen) with rococo paintings by the rural artist Peder Aadnes (1739–92). New to the museum is a middle ages section with a reconstructed hearth cottage. In the administration building are comprehensive archive, photograph and artifact collections, and a new beaver exhibition. The museum also has an amphitheater for concerts, theater and film performances.

== Related reading ==
- Sverdrup Ugelstad, Janike (2007). Thi han blev en kunstmaler: Peder Aadnes og hans billedverden (in Norwegian). Oslo: Novus forlag. ISBN 9788270994663.
