= Tent House =

Tent House may refer to

- Tent House, an imprint of Giza Studio
- Tent House, Mount Isa

== See also ==
- Tent house, regimental arsenal building used in Norway
