= Tingelstad Church =

Church in Innlandet, Norway

- Tingelstad kirke
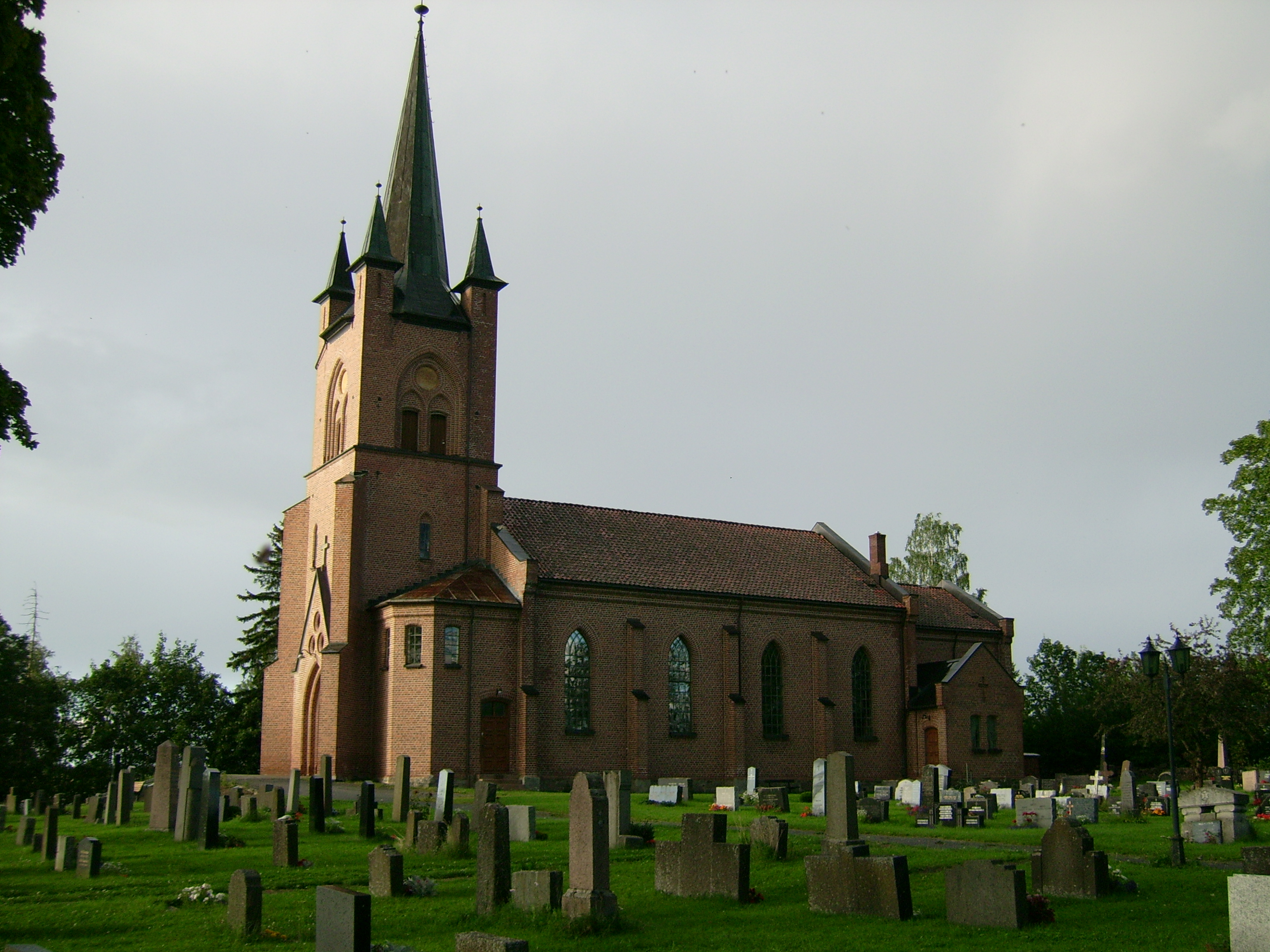
- View of the church
- Tingelstad Church
- 60°23′42″N 10°29′09″E
- Location: Gran Municipality, Innlandet
- Country: Norway
- Denomination: Church of Norway
- Churchmanship: Evangelical Lutheran

History
- Status: Parish church
- Founded: 1866
- Consecrated: 5 December 1866

Architecture
- Functional status: Active
- Architect(s): Heinrich Ernst Schirmer and Wilhelm von Hanno
- Architectural type: Long church
- Style: Neo-Gothic
- Groundbreaking: 5 July 1865
- Completed: 1866 (160 years ago)

Specifications
- Capacity: 450
- Materials: Brick

Administration
- Diocese: Hamar bispedømme
- Deanery: Hadeland og Land prosti
- Parish: Gran/Tingelstad
- Norwegian Cultural Heritage Site
- Type: Church
- Status: Protected
- ID: 85624

Tingelstad Church (Norwegian: Tingelstad kirke) is a parish church of the Church of Norway in Gran Municipality in Innlandet county, Norway. It is located in the village of Tingelstad. It is one of the churches for the Gran/Tingelstad parish which is part of the Hadeland og Land prosti (deanery) in the Diocese of Hamar. The red brick church was built in a long church design in 1866 using plans drawn up by the architects Heinrich Ernst Schirmer and Wilhelm von Hanno. The church seats about 450 people.

== History ==
The new church law of 1851 mandated that churches must be large enough to hold at least one-fifth of the population of the parish. The Old Tingelstad Church and the Grinaker Stave Church were both too small, so they planned to close both of them and to build a new church at Tingelstad. Heinrich Ernst Schirmer and Wilhelm von Hanno were hired to design the new building and the masonry was to be done by the mason Herman Frang. The old Grinaker Stave Church was torn down and some of the salvageable materials from that building were reused in the new church. On 5 July 1865 the foundation stone of the church was laid by the local mayor, Amund Larsen Gulden. On 5 December 1866 the finished church was consecrated by parish priest Søren Brun Bugge on behalf of the bishop. The church cost 9000 speciedaler. In 1929, the church was wired for electricity.

== Inventory ==
The church has a baptismal font dating from around the year 1720. In the choir, there are two sculptures representing Pietas and Justitia dating from the 1720s. The pulpit was transferred from the old Grindaker stave church and was the work of carved by sculptor Nicolai Larsen Borg (1673-1764). Behind the altar is a glass painting with the upper part from 1935 by Borgar Hauglid and the lower part of 1991 by Veslemøy Stoltenberg.

== Media gallery ==
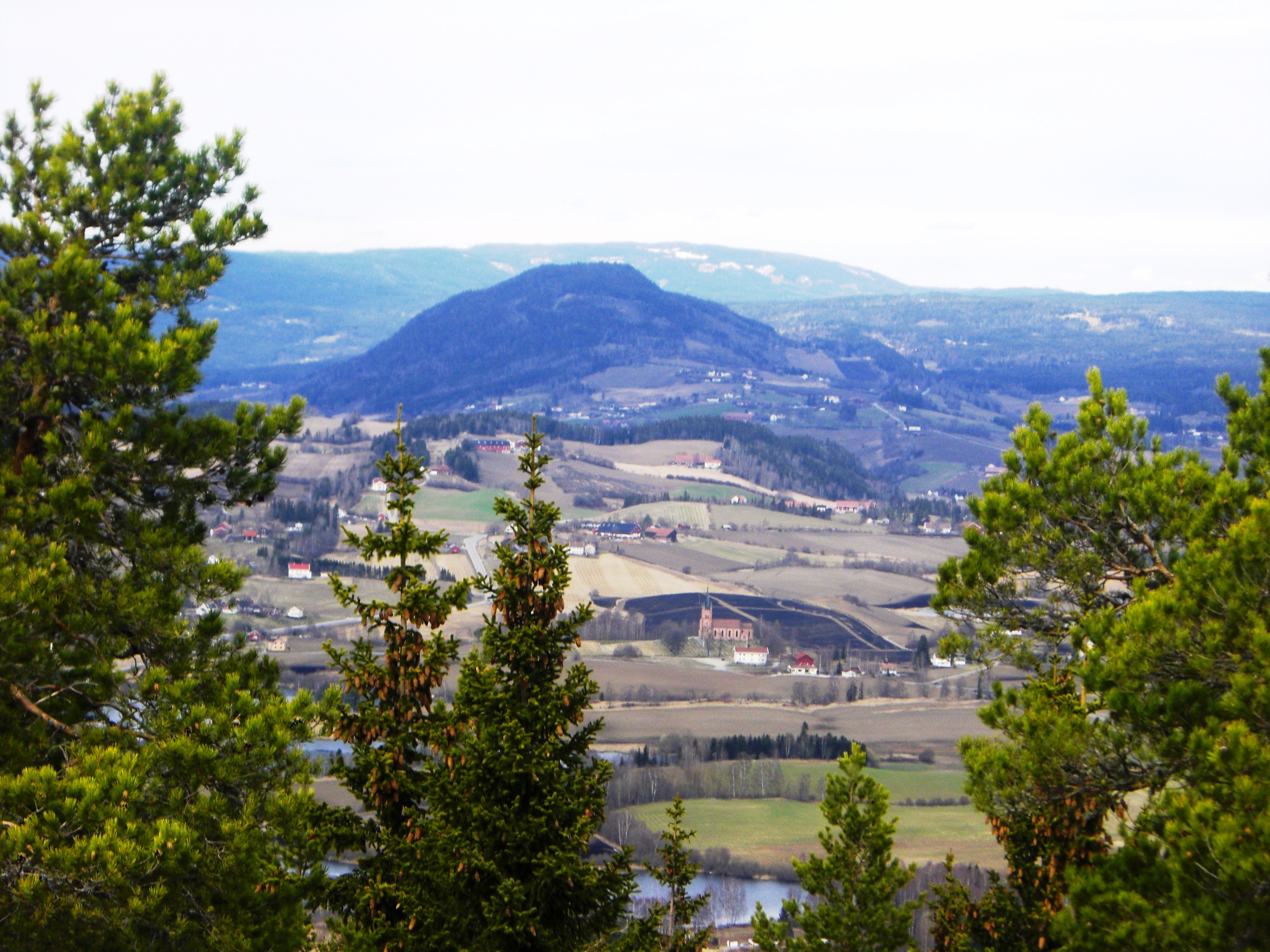

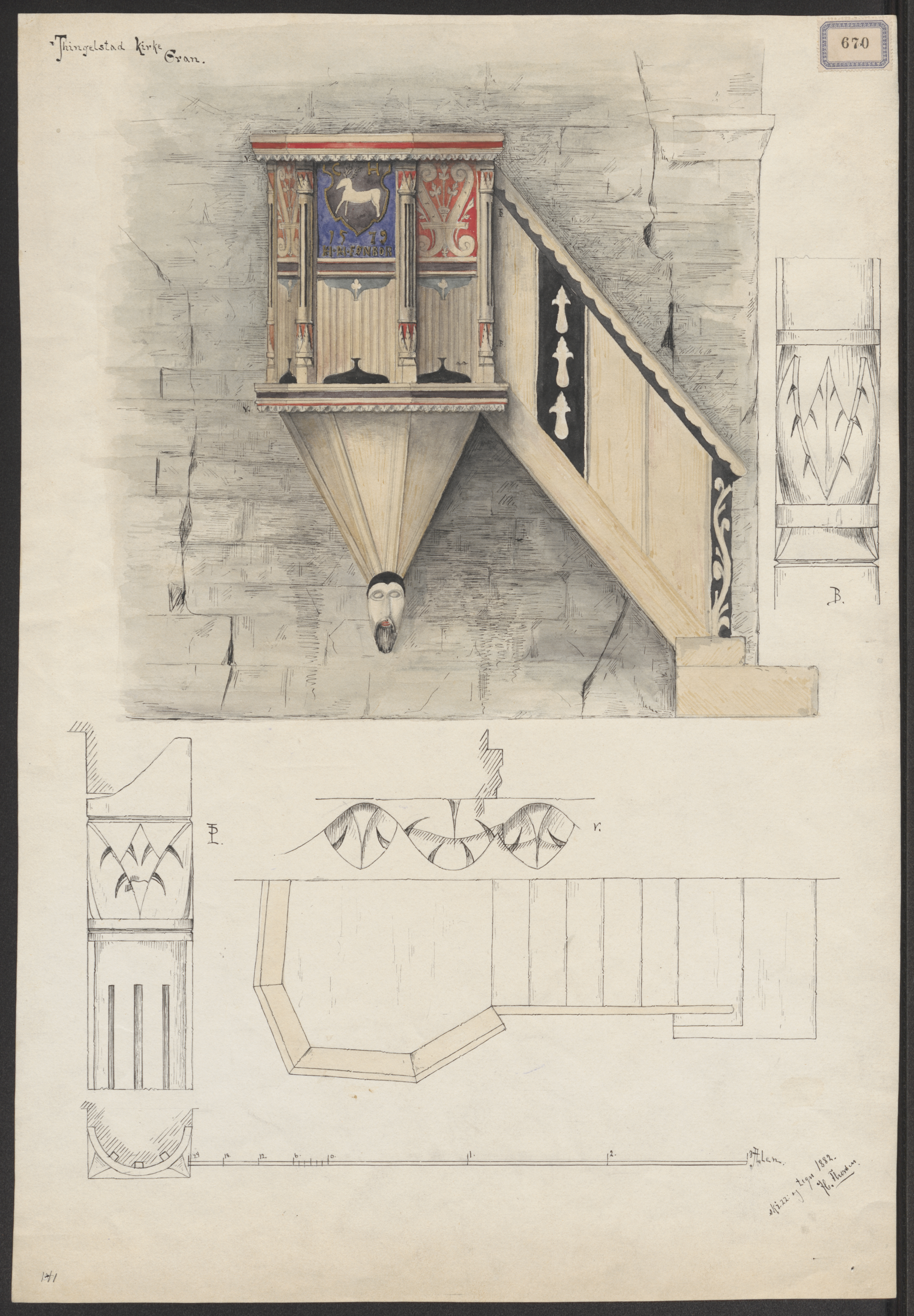

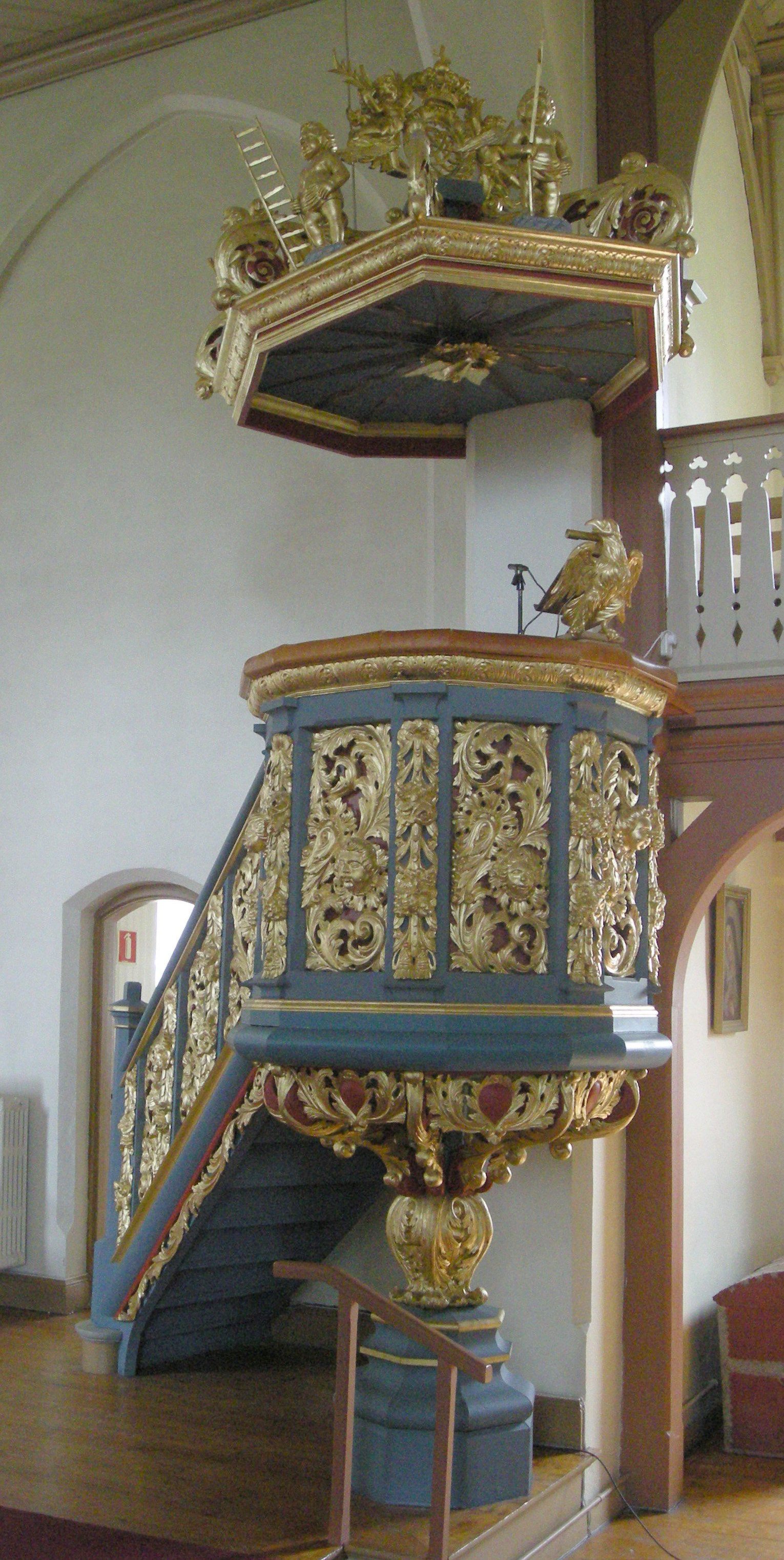

== See also ==
- List of churches in Hamar
