= Peder Aadnes =

Norwegian painter (1739–1792)

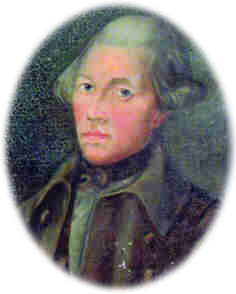
- Born: 10 August 1739; Odnes, Land, Norway
- Died: 20 June 1792 (aged 52); Ringerike, Norway
- Occupation: Painter

Peder Pedersen Aadnes (10 August 1739 – 20 June 1792) was a Norwegian rural painter.

Aadnes was born in Odnes in what is now Søndre Land Municipality. Unusually for a rural painter, he chose typical upper-class subjects for his repertoire. He decorated churches, farm interiors, and furnishings throughout eastern Norway in the Rococo style. Aadnes also painted portraits. His style is often referred to as a transitional form in Norwegian painting, from more traditional folk art to the new style represented by Johan Christian Dahl.

Aadnes was a pioneering artist in the tradition of Dutch and German painters. His style paved the way for the later traditional floral decorations and floral paintings known as rosemaling in villages in Norway, and also formed a backdrop for Norwegian Romantic nationalism. Because of Aadnes's role between traditional Dutch and German Rococo, and between the new Norwegian painting on the one hand and traditional floral paintings on the other, he is sometimes referred to as the greatest Norwegian artist of the 1700s.

== Biography ==
Aadnes served as an apprentice when Eggert Munch painted the altarpiece in the church in Fluberg. At that time he was 15 years old. Later, as an adult, he apprenticed for three months to the painter and drawing teacher Niels Thaaning. In 1772 he married 17-year-old Ingeborg Trøgstad. He was 33 years old at the time and they had five children together. He also took over the family farm at the time of his marriage. While working on the family farm, painting took him to various places in eastern Norway.

Today he is associated with a cheerful Rococo style, in contrast to the somewhat heavy and somber Rococo that dominated in Europe. He is especially known for the murals he painted in the Thomle building 1770, now at the Lands Museum. In this work, Aadnes depicted silk-clad upper-class people frolicking in castles and parks. He found examples of this style in patterns and engravings produced by other Rococo artists. However, few people see his works in the Thomle building compared to the thousands that see his work in the Myttingstua building at Maihaugen. The Tomle building is nonetheless of particular interest because it features the typical trees and fantasy landscapes that Aadnes was known for. Notable details include a suitor placing his hand high on his lover's bodice while her chaperon sleeps, and also a little boy peeking under the skirts of a lady on a swing.

There are also paintings by Aadnes in other places in eastern Norway, such as the Lunde Church in Nordre Land Municipality, the Nordsinni Church, and the Bagn Church. Many of the buildings where he painted wall panels have been lost, some through renovation and other in fires.

== Registration and research ==
Ragnvald Einbu and Anne Karina Giske have launched a major effort to record and photograph Aadnes's works in eastern Norway, Valdres, Hadeland, and Ringerike. The registration work is quite difficult because he rarely signed his works. At the time, it did not seem important to sign the works because they were merely viewed as decoration. Some of the fixed elements that Aadnes used in his paintings are used to identify his works. Aadnes consistently used the same shades of blue and depicted carefully cultivated trees, clearly developed over time, and nobility.

== Gallery ==
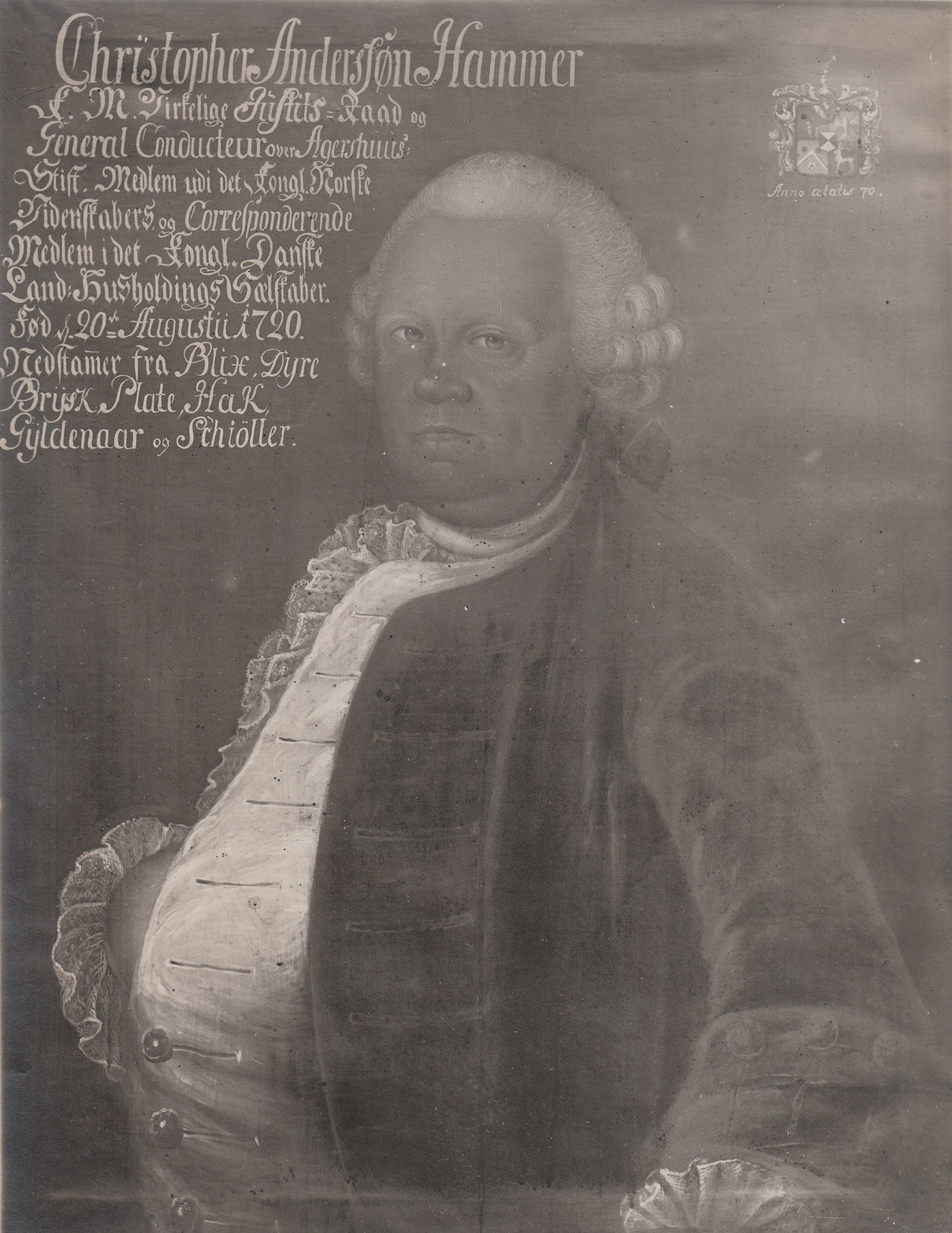

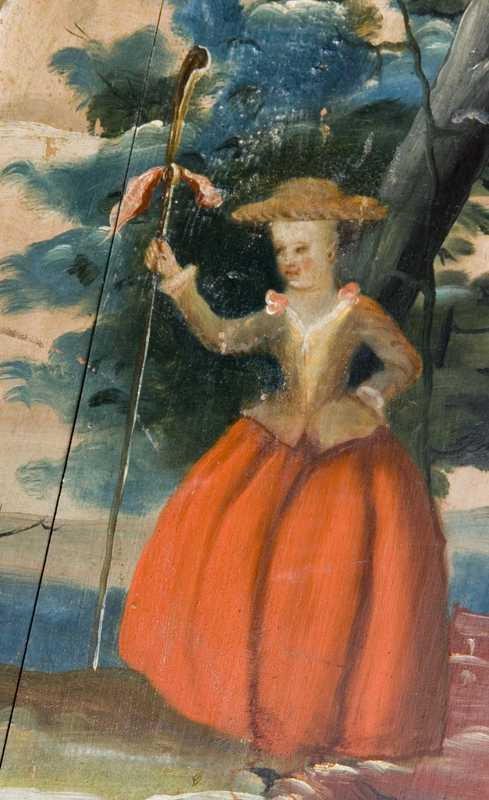

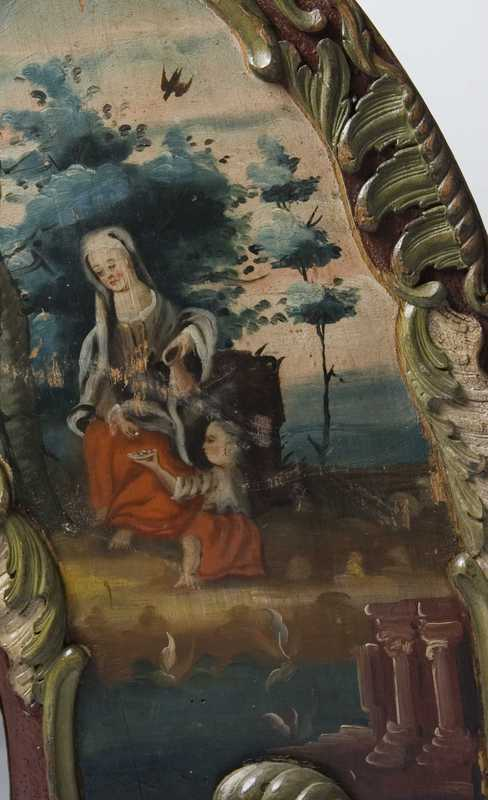

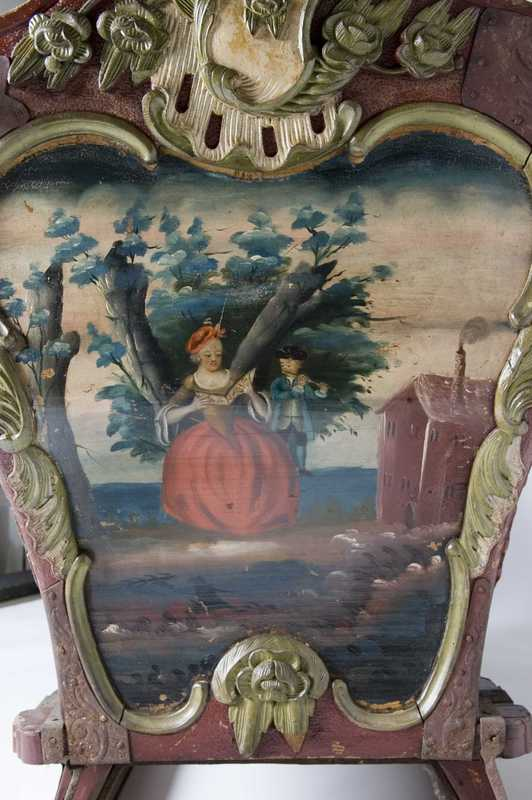

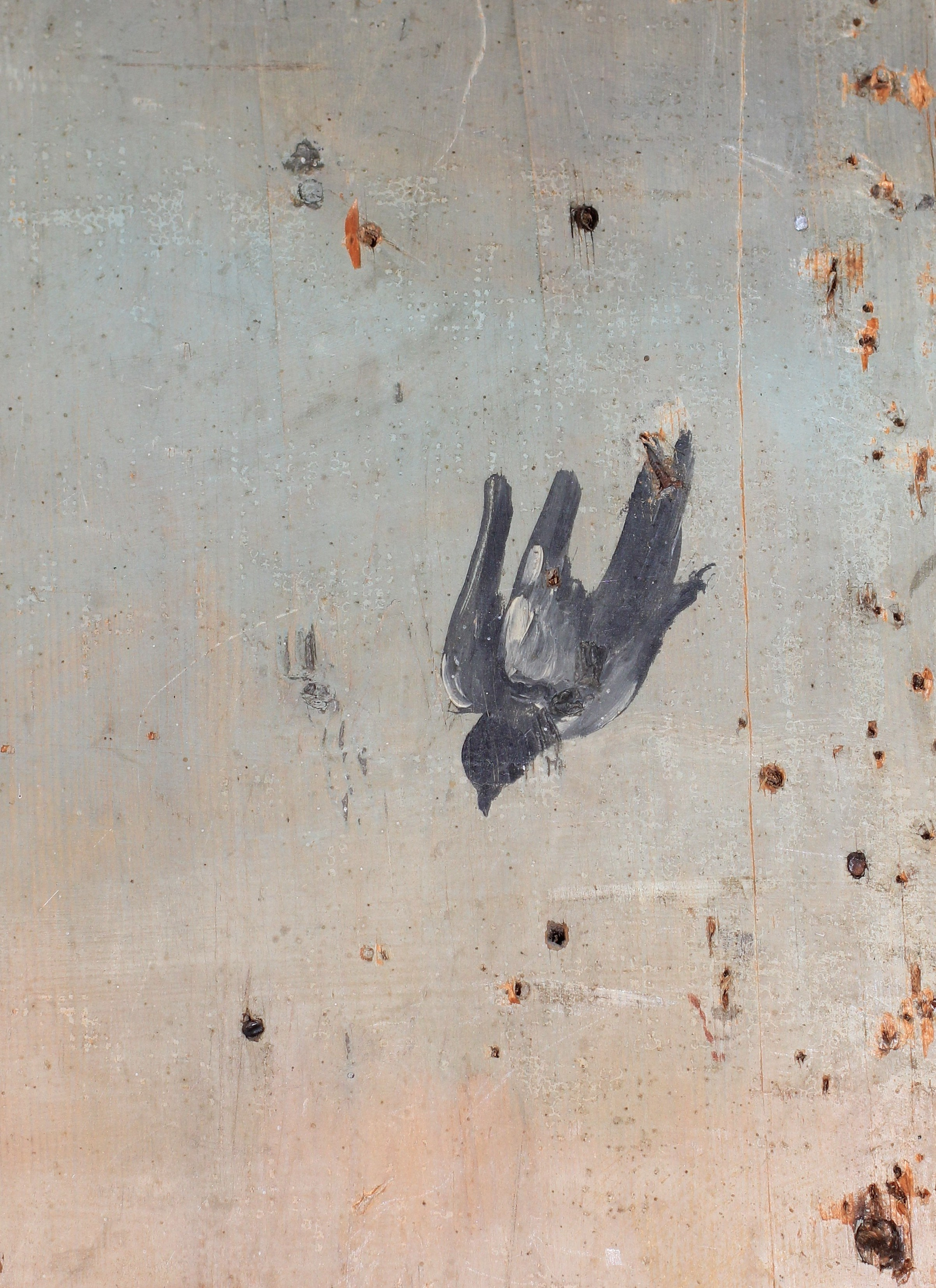
