= Tent house =

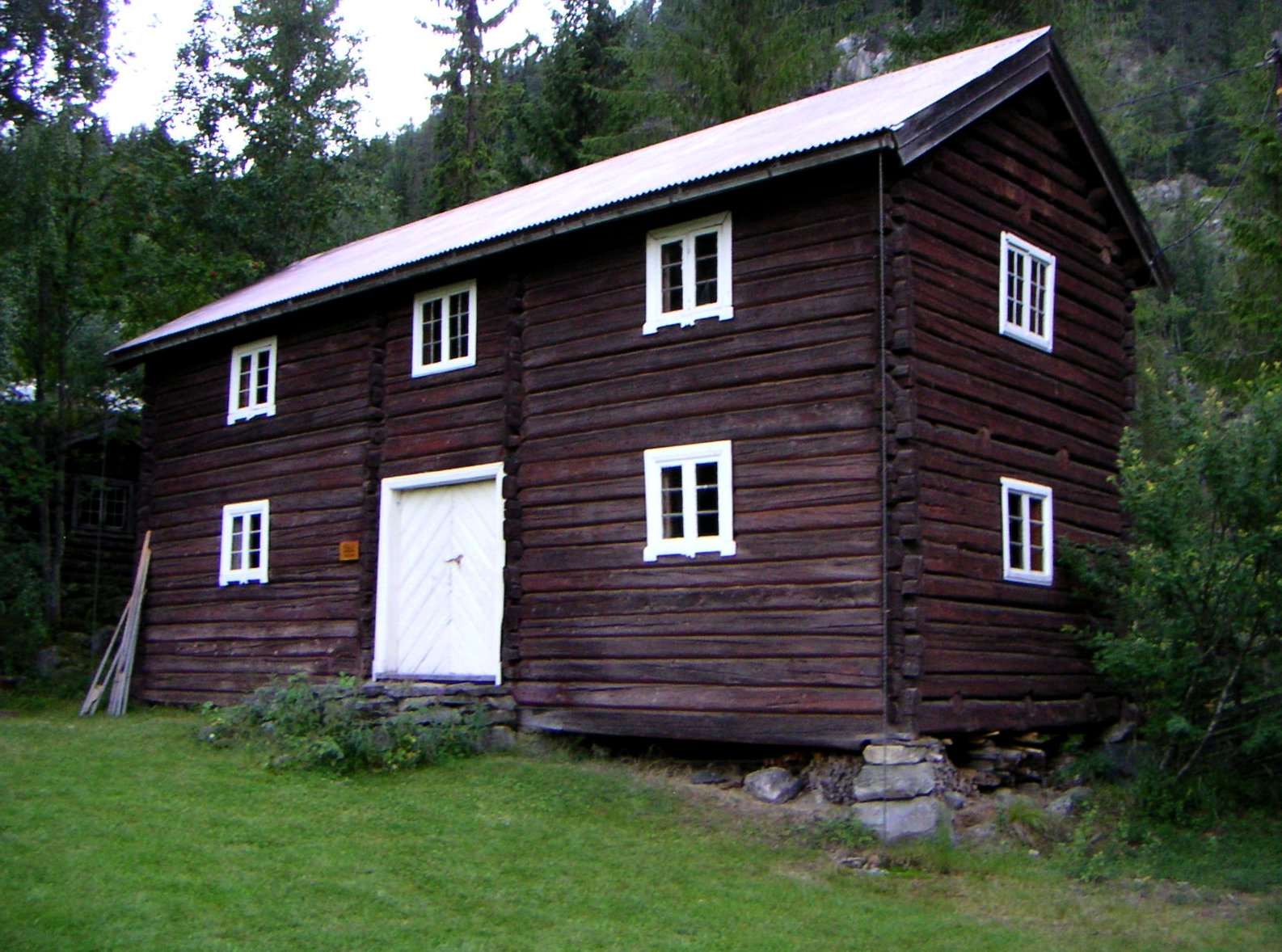
The "tent house" for the Ytre Valdreske regiment 1813–50. Now at Bagn Bygdesamling.

A tent house (Norwegian: Telthus) or a regimental arsenal building was in use in Norway from the establishment of the regular army in 1628, and became common at the special exercise grounds.

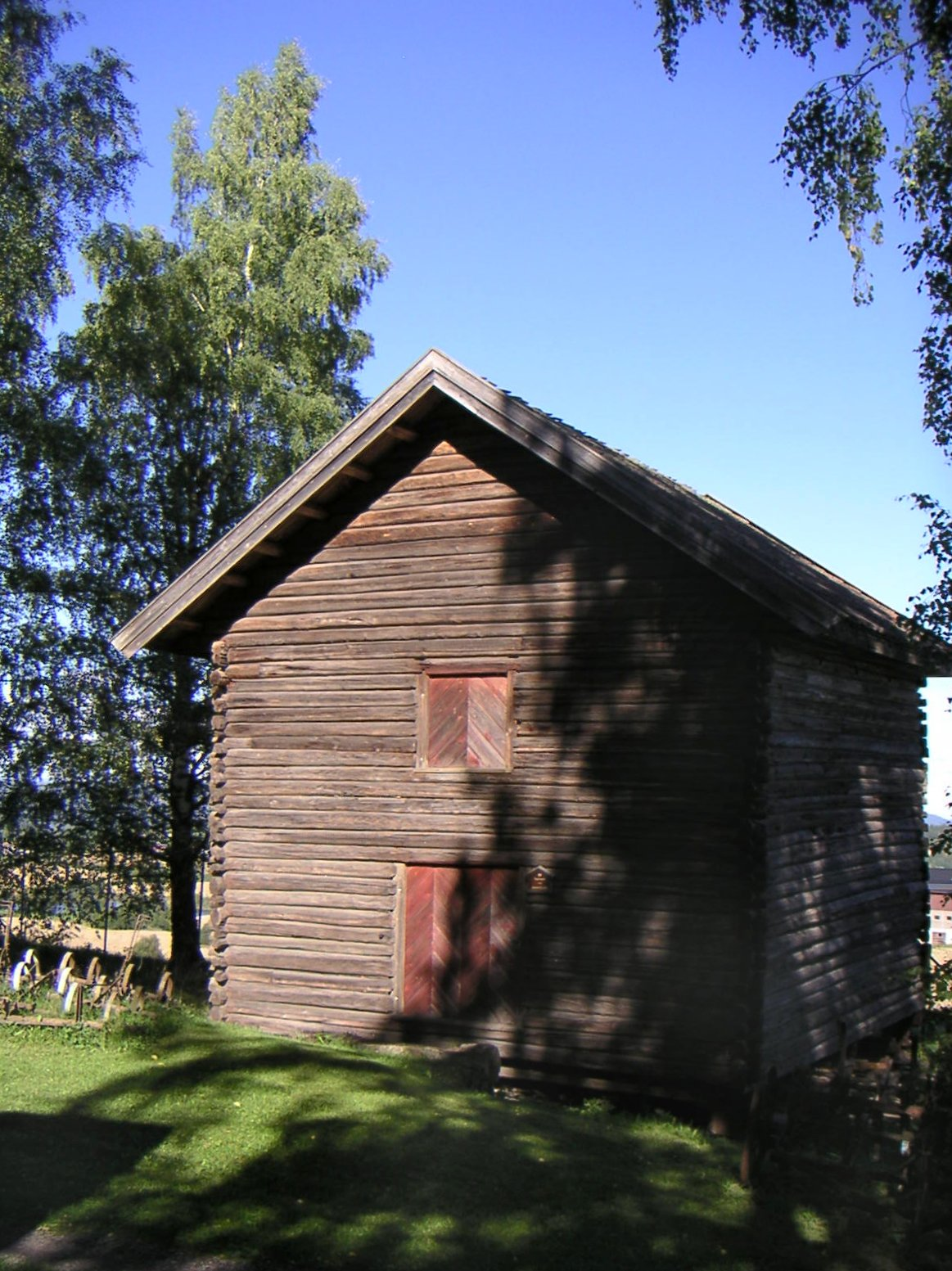
The tent house for Granske regiment. Now at Hadeland Folkemuseum.

In the first years, on every Sunday after the sermon, the local regiment would drill outside the church. After 1774 this location was changed in favour of special exercise or parade grounds, with annual musters of 12 days. At these places the "tent houses" were built.

Each larger farm or a number of smaller farms was obliged to supply one fully equipped soldier. This farm or group of farms was called a legd. One person was then appointed to do the service for the legd.

Ytre Valdreske Kompagni had an exercise or parade ground located by the river, close to Bagn Church in Sør-Aurdal Municipality. The regimental arsenal is now located at Bagn Bygdesamling.

Granske Kompagni had its exercise ground at Granavollen in Gran Municipality. The regimental arsenal is now located at the Hadeland Folkemuseum.

== Historical context ==
Northwestern Europe witnessed warfare on a scale not previously experienced during the period between 1558 and 1721. Military change was rapid and extensive in Norway, modifying the army structure and increasing the fortification of the borders and strong points. The burdens placed on the populace grew dramatically.

The Norwegian regimental army was established during the Thirty Years' War, which consisted of a series of declared and undeclared wars based on religious and economic objectives that raged throughout central and northern Europe in 1618–1648. Denmark-Norway actively participated in the Thirty Year War (see Hannibal War) between 1625 and 1630. The French, English and Dutch opposed the Habsburg Empire. When the Empire attacked Danish possessions on the Baltic and in northern Germany, Christian IV of Denmark's troops joined, but were defeated by the army of the Catholic League.
