= Tingelstad =

Village in Gran Municipality, Norway

- Village
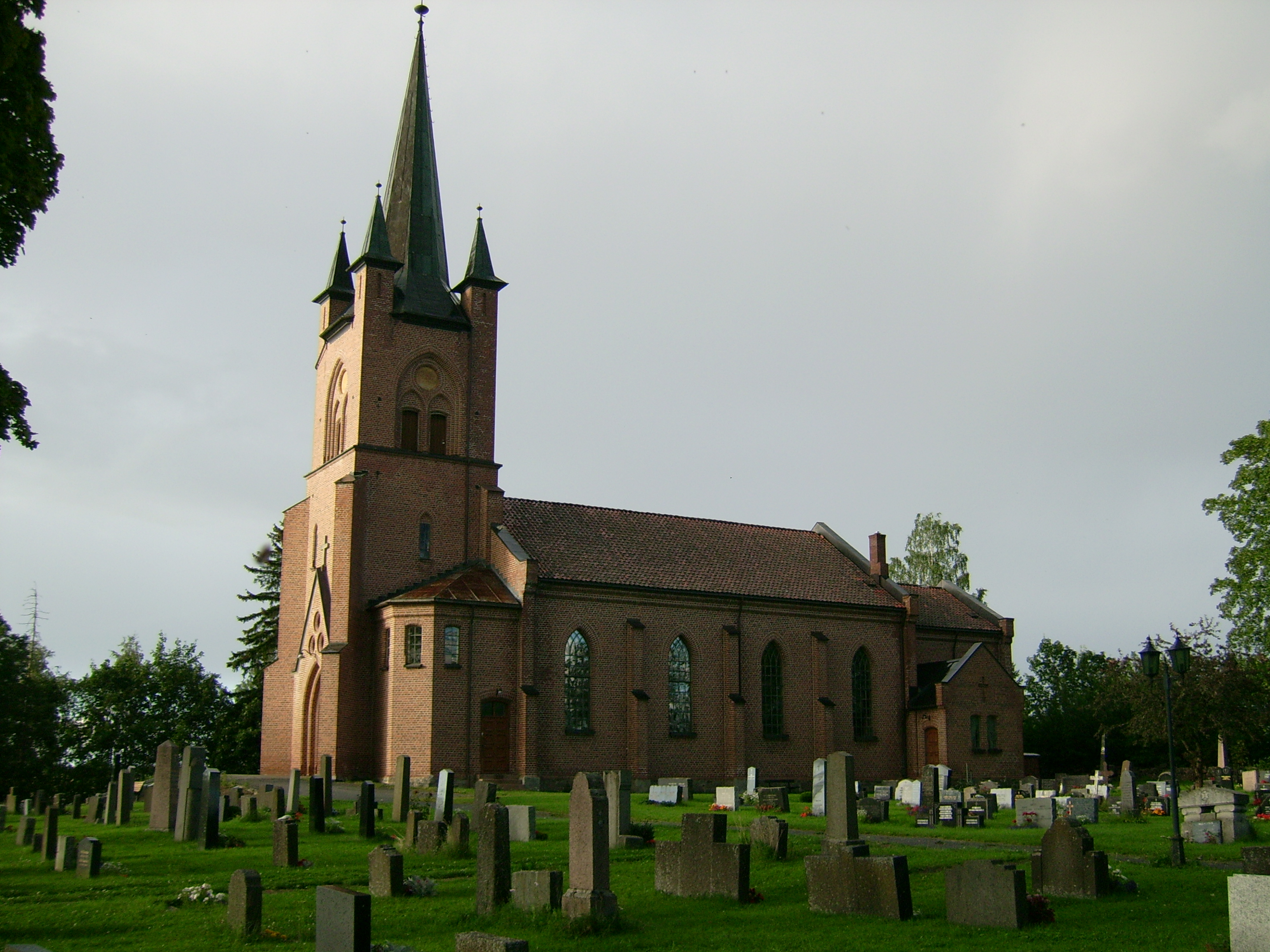
- View of the village church
- Interactive map of Tingelstad
- Location within Innlandet Location within Norway
- Coordinates: 60.392°N 10.51184°E
- Country: Norway
- Region: Eastern Norway
- County: Innlandet
- District: Hadeland
- Municipality: Gran Municipality
- Elevation: 313 m (1,027 ft)
- Time zone: UTC+01:00 (CET)
  - Summer (DST): UTC+02:00 (CEST)
- Post Code: 2760 Brandbu

Tingelstad is a village in Gran Municipality in Innlandet county, Norway. The village is located about 5 kilometres (3.1 mi) to the southwest of the village of Brandbu and about 2.5 kilometres (1.6 mi) east of the large lake Randsfjorden.

Tingelstad is the location of the Hadeland Folkemuseum which is the regional museum for the traditional district of Hadeland. Tingelstad is also the site of two churches: Old Tingelstad Church, a medieval stone church dating from the 1200s and the new parish church, Tingelstad Church which was built in 1866.

== Tingelstad Church ==
Tingelstad Church is a long church with a west tower, built in red-bricked tiles. It was constructed in 1866 after drawings by architects Heinrich Ernst Schirmer and Wilhelm von Hanno. It was restored in 1958 and 1991. The church is characterized by neo-Gothic architecture. The church is relatively large and richly designed. A number of historic features were transferred from Grinaker Stave Church which was demolished in 1866.
