= Old Tingelstad Church =

Church in Innlandet, Norway

- Tingelstad gamle kirke
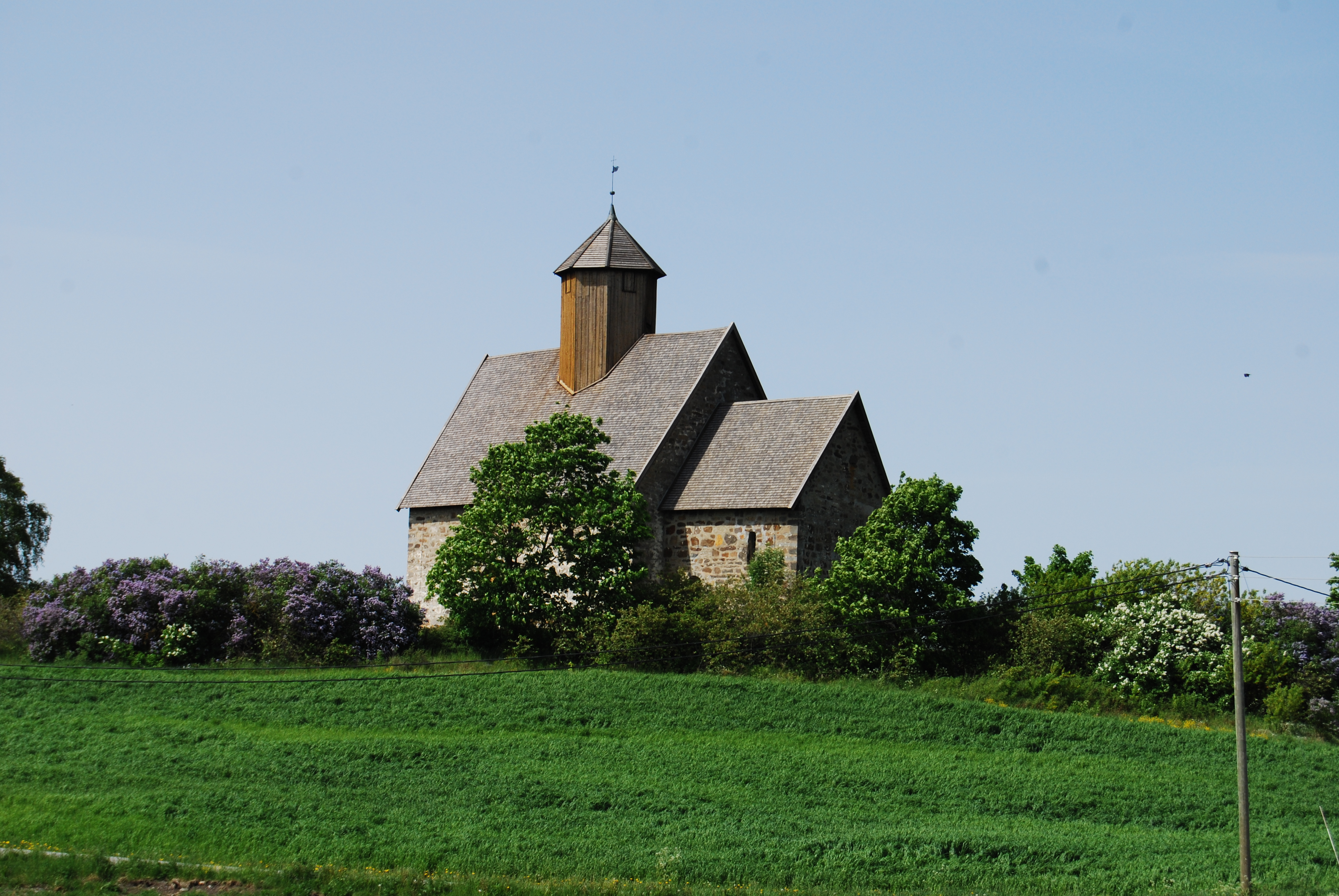
- View of the church
- Old Tingelstad Church
- 60°23′38″N 10°30′37″E
- Location: Gran Municipality, Innlandet
- Country: Norway
- Denomination: Church of Norway
- Previous denomination: Catholic Church
- Churchmanship: Evangelical Lutheran

History
- Status: Parish church
- Founded: c. 1220
- Consecrated: c. 1220

Architecture
- Functional status: Active
- Architectural type: Long church
- Style: Romanesque
- Completed: c. 1220 (806 years ago)

Specifications
- Capacity: 110
- Materials: Stone

Administration
- Diocese: Hamar bispedømme
- Deanery: Hadeland og Land prosti
- Parish: Gran/Tingelstad
- Norwegian Cultural Heritage Site
- Type: Church
- Status: Automatically protected
- ID: 81474

Old Tingelstad Church (Norwegian: Tingelstad gamle kirke) is a former parish church of the Church of Norway in Gran Municipality in Innlandet county, Norway. It is located in the village of Tingelstad. It is part of the Gran/Tingelstad parish which is part of the Hadeland og Land prosti (deanery) in the Diocese of Hamar. The gray, stone church was built in a long church design around the year 1220 using plans drawn up by an unknown architect. The church seats about 110 people.

== History ==
The stone church at Tingelstad was built around the year 1220 (modern dendrochronological dating have dated the wood parts of the roof to the years 1219–1220). It was likely first built as a private chapel for a local manor farm. The design of the church is typical of many Romanesque medieval stone churches, with a rectangular nave and a smaller choir. The nave measures about 14 by 11 metres (46 ft × 36 ft) on the outside, and the choir measures about 7 by 8.5 metres (23 ft × 28 ft). The chancel is actually a little crooked in relation to the nave, and there is a sacristy on the north side of the chancel. The Old Tingelstad Church has also at some point been rebuilt. At the west end, the gable-end is constructed of wood. In 1673 a report was made that describe the wall as brøstefeldig or dilapidated, necessitating reconstruction. In 1820, the old tower was taken down and a new wooden octagonal tower was constructed on the roof of the nave. According to the new church law in 1851, the parish church must have room for a certain percentage of the parish population, and this church was too small. Plans were made to build a new church about 1.3 kilometres (0.81 mi) to the west of the old church. The new Tingelstad Church was completed in 1866, and after that, the old church was renamed as the "Old Tingelstad Church" and it was taken out of regular use. By royal decree, the church was approved to have one or two annual services each year in the summer. Otherwise it would only be used on special occasions and would be preserved for history.

== Inventory ==
The spire on the wooden belfry bears a copy of a 12th-century weather vane. The original vane is held in the Museum of Cultural History in Oslo. It is believed that it was once fitted to the bow of a warship.

Although the church contains a few other original, medieval features such as a wooden crucifix and a stone altar, it is best known for its intact interior from the 16th and 17th centuries. The pulpit is from 1579 and is one of Norway's oldest. An altar frontal from 1699 can also be found in the church. A unique mural from 1632 depicting the Dano-Norwegian coat of arms, has been partially revealed on the interior north wall.

== Media gallery ==
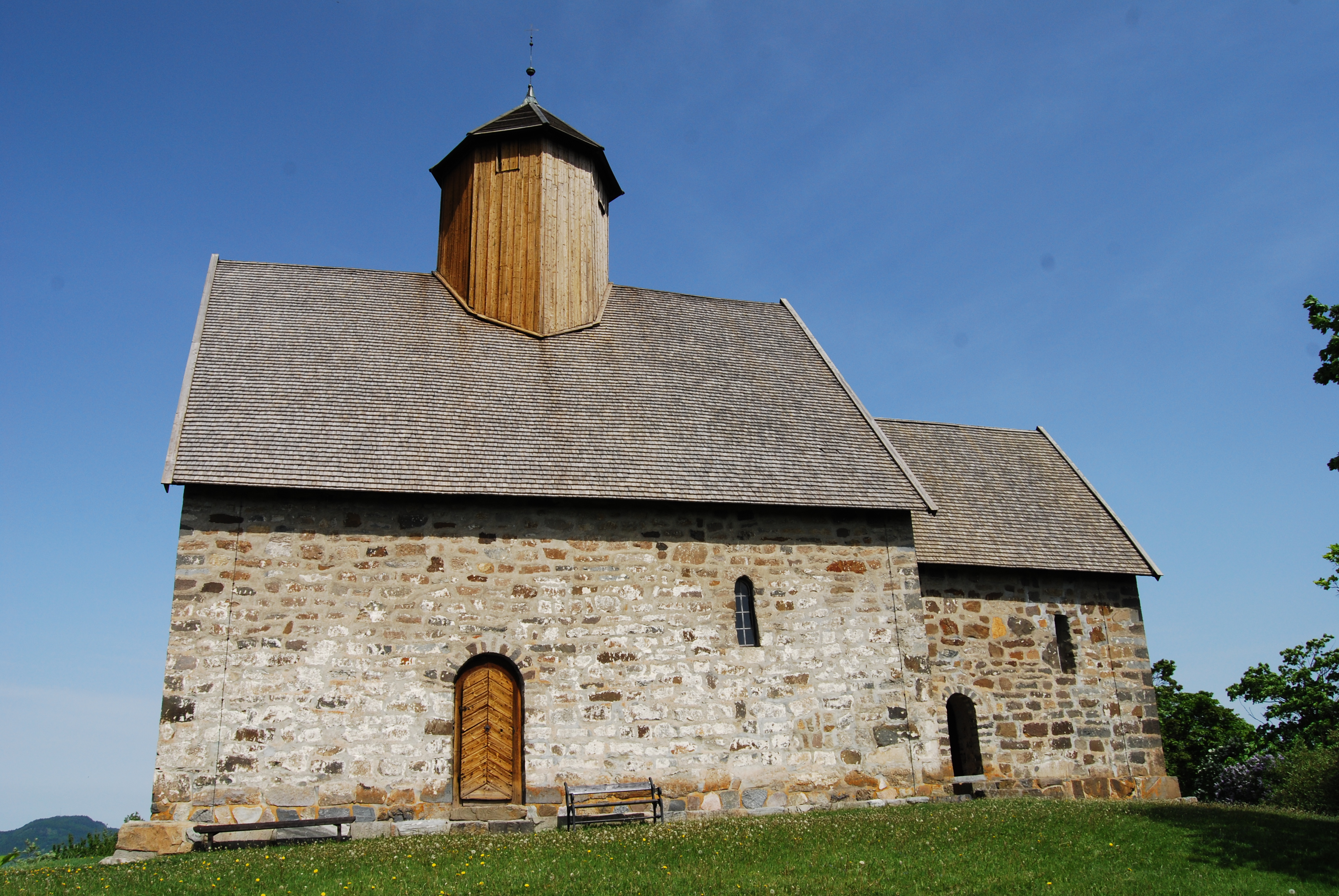

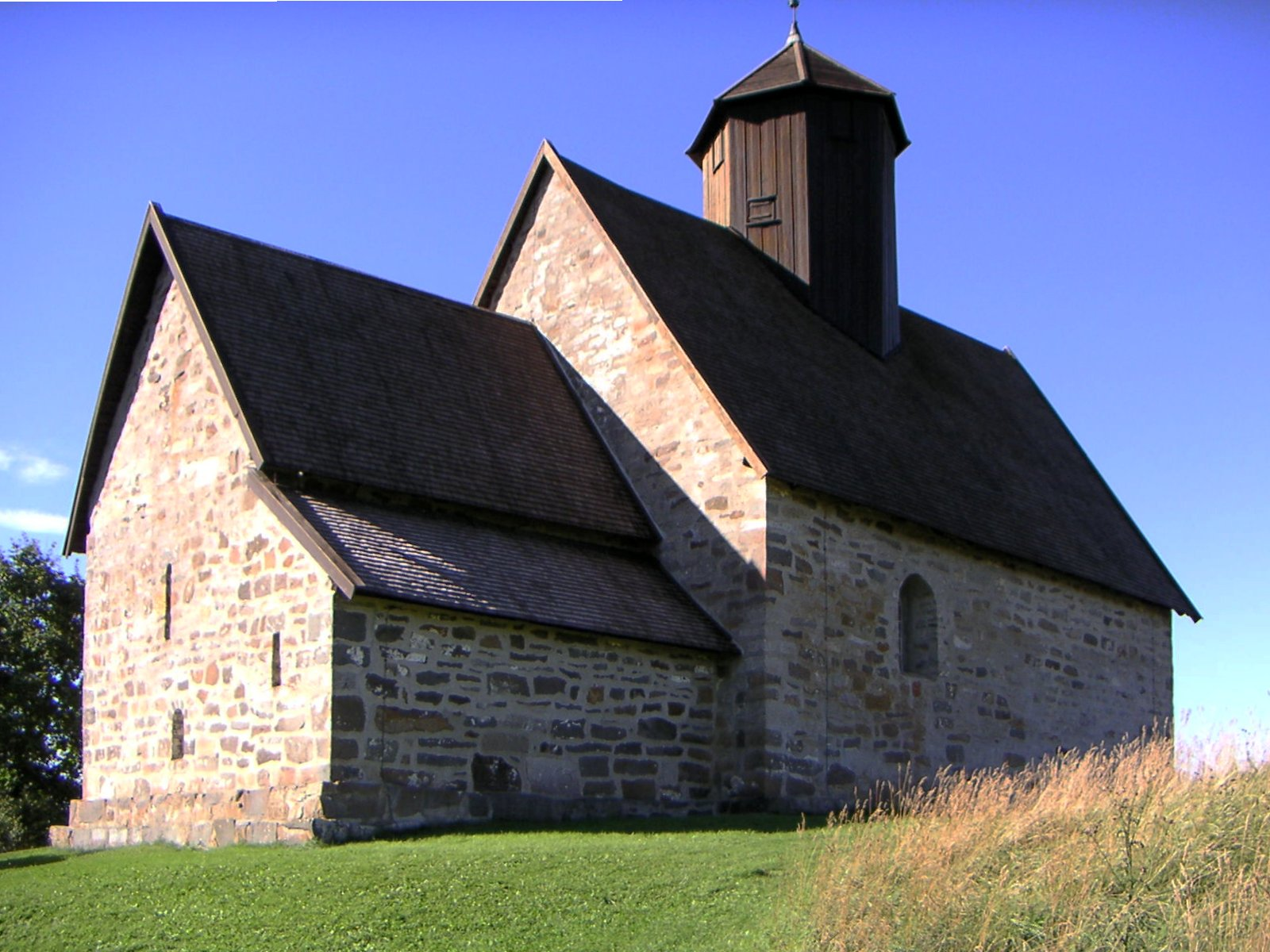

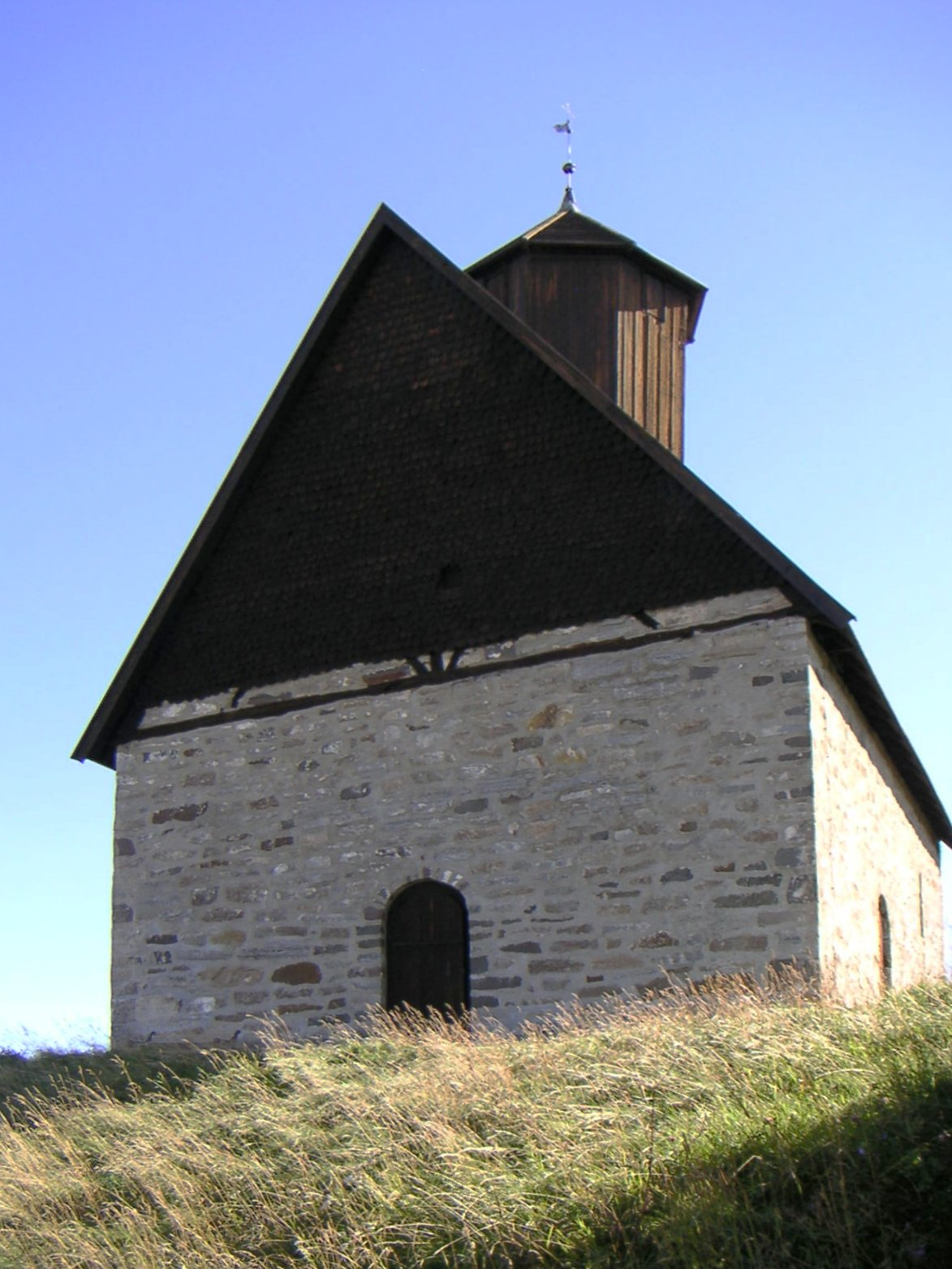

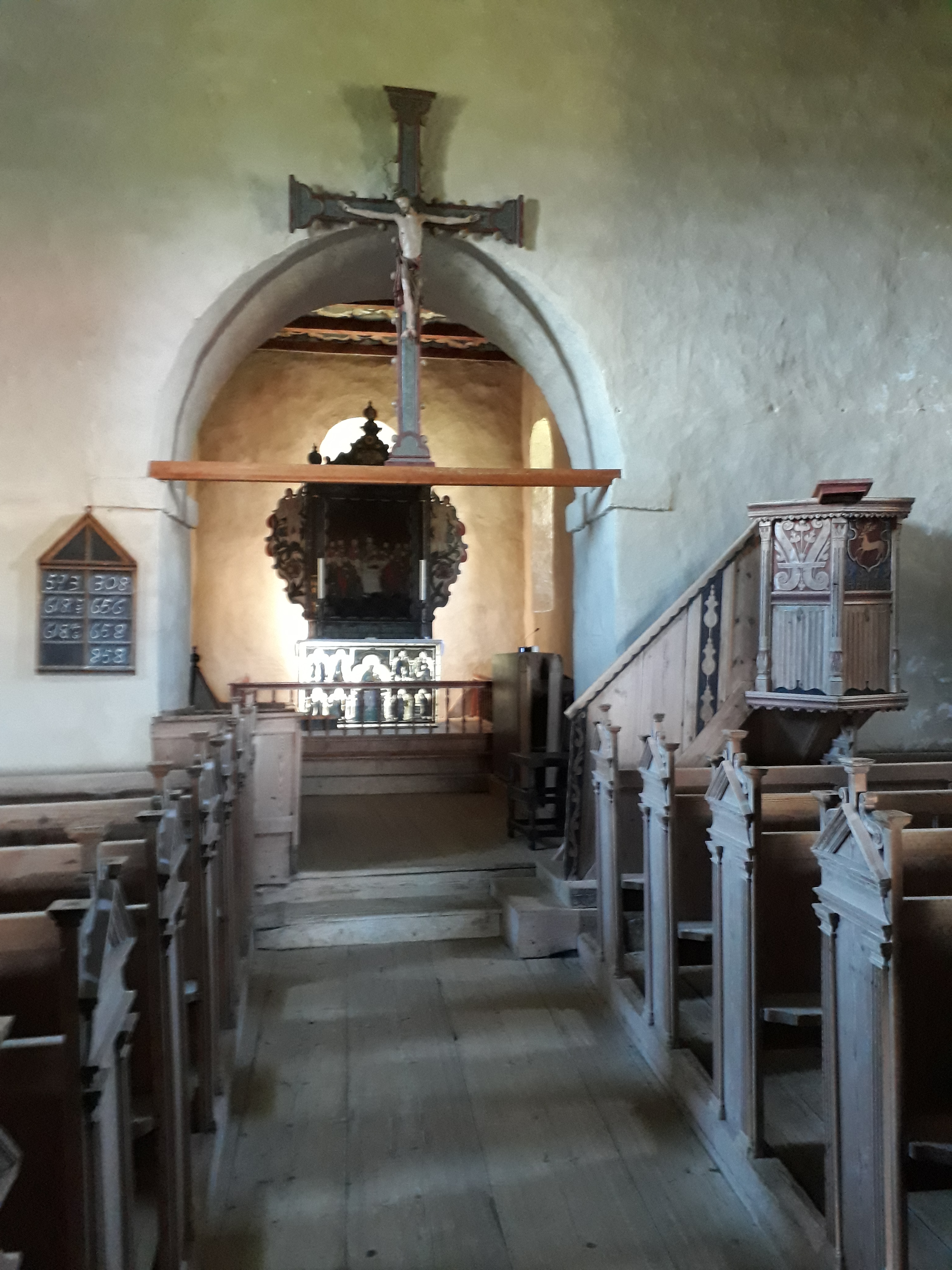

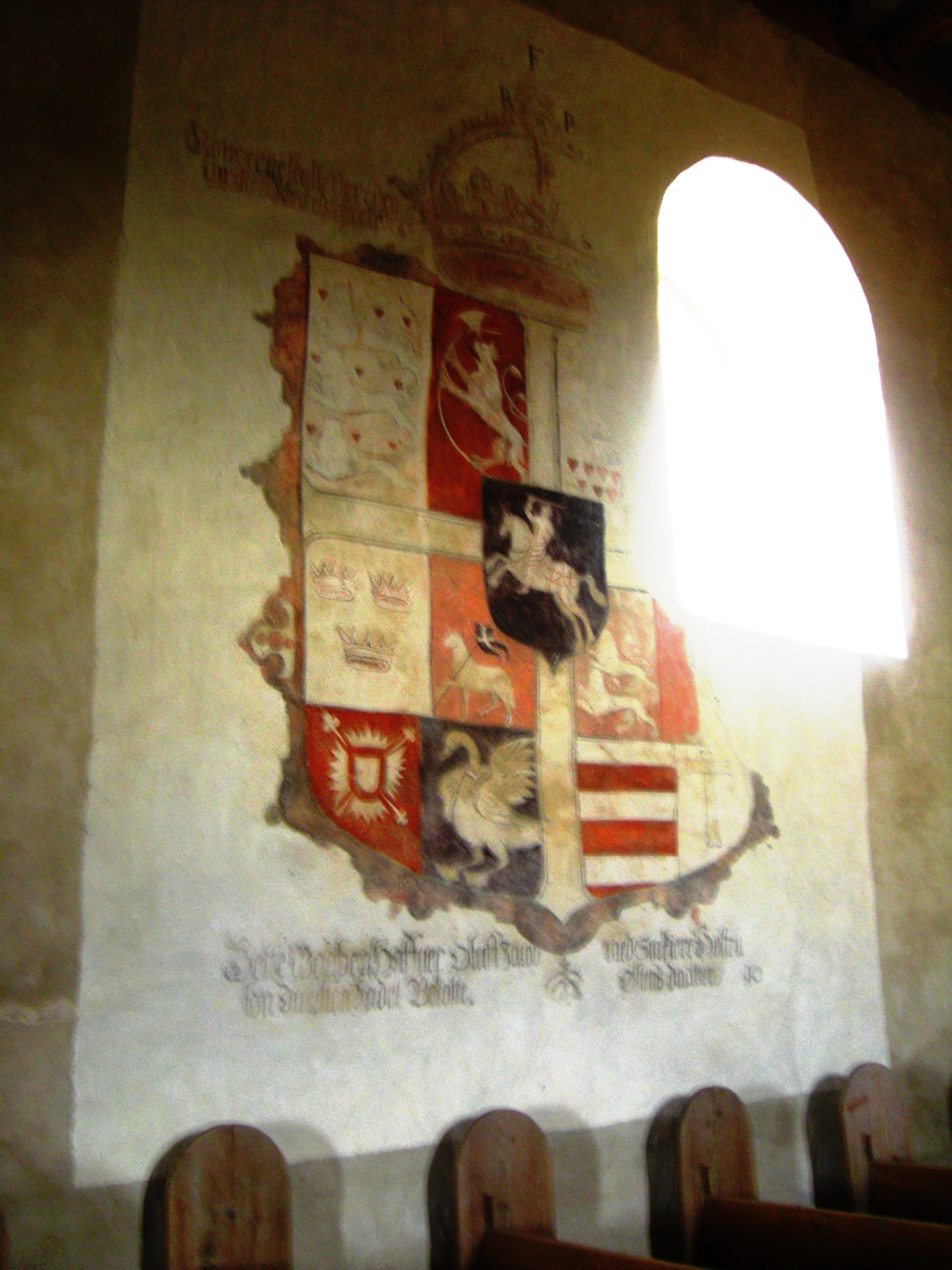

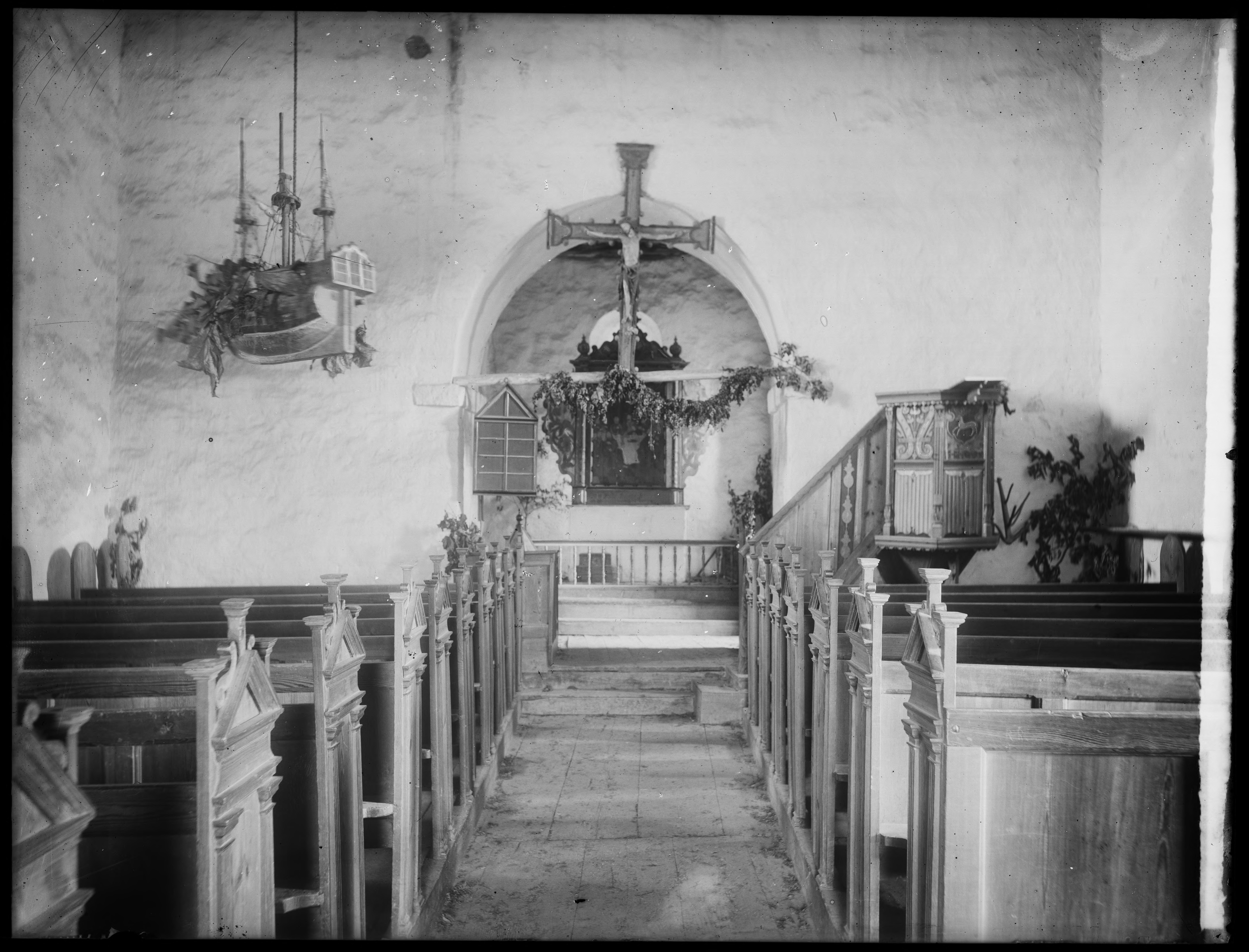

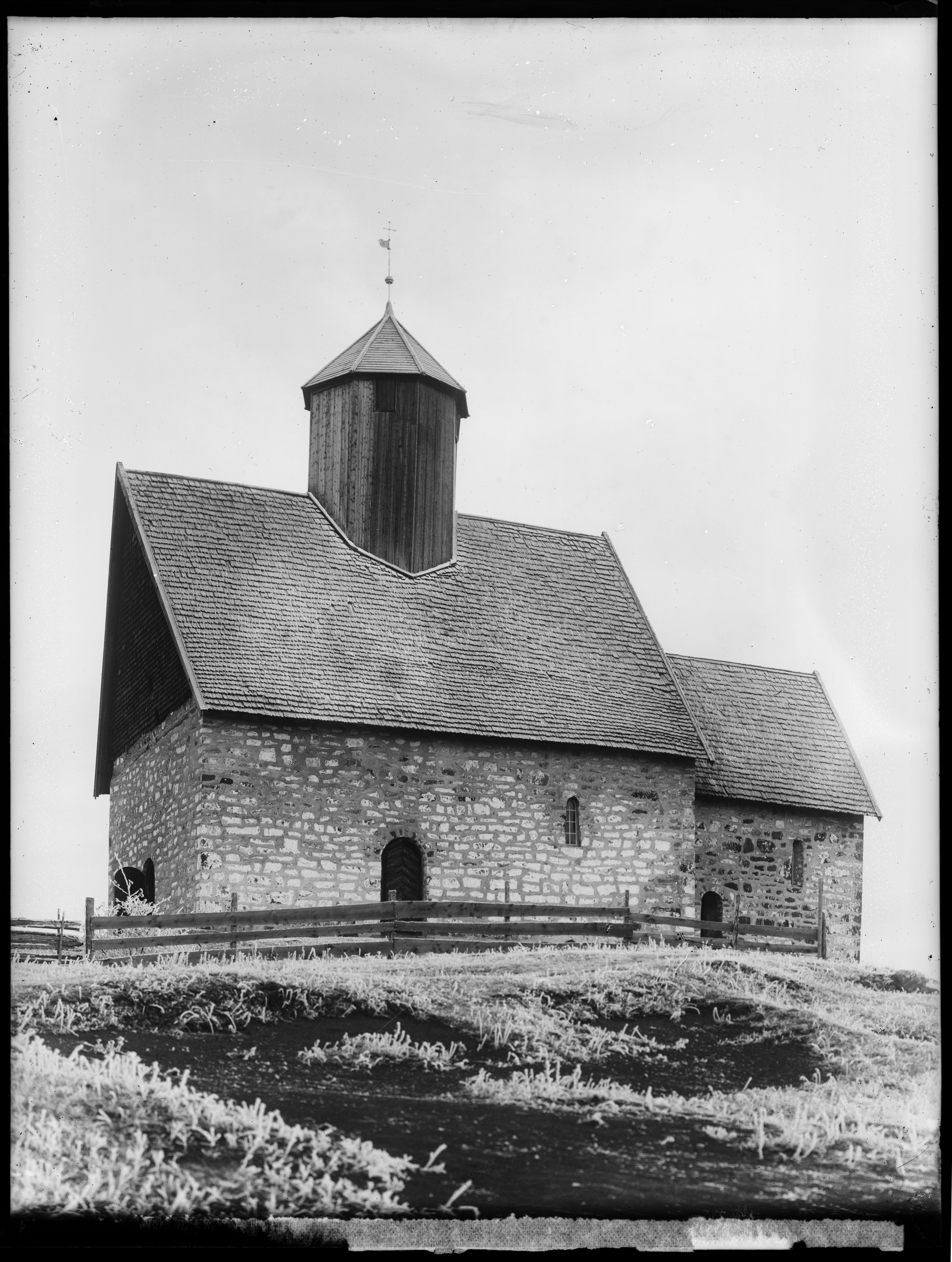

== See also ==
- List of churches in Hamar

== Related reading ==
- Norges Kunsthistorie, Leif Østby, 1977
- Hadeland Bygdebok, Dr. Anders Bugge, 1932
